= List of provincial expressways of China =

In China, regional expressways are a part of the country’s national highway system.

- Numbered: All expressways are ordered by number.
- Unnumbered: All expressways are ordered by direction, starting from north or east.

== Anhui ==
Anhui Expressway Numbering Plan 2016-2030

All routes have two digits.

- North-south routes end in odd numbers and are arranged in ascending order from east to west, numbered from 01 to 59.
- East-west routes end in even numbers and are arranged in ascending order from north to south, numbered from 02 to 58.
- Connecting routes begin with "6" and are arranged in ascending order from north to south.
- Ring roads begin with "8" and are arranged in ascending order from north to south.
- Branch lines begin with "9" and are arranged in ascending order from north to south.

Number and name	Chinese name	Route	Origin	Terminus	Length	Notes
S01 Xinyang Expressway	新扬高速	Xinyi - Yangzhou	Huanghuatang (JS border)	Tianchang (JS border)		Known as S01 in Anhui and S49 in Jiangsu
S01 Lihuang Expressway	溧黄高速	Liyang - Huangshan	Guangde (JS border)	Shexian		Became a portion of G4012 in 2013
S02 Xushang Expressway	徐商高速	Xuzhou - Shangqiu	Xiaoxian	Shangqiu (HE border)		
S03 Ningxuan Expressway	宁宣高速	Nanjing - Xuancheng	Liqiao (JS border)	Xuancheng	31 km	Known as S03 in Anhui and S55 in Jiangsu
S04 Sisu Expressway	泗宿高速	Siyang - Suzhou	Sixian (JS border)	Suzhou		Became a portion of G1516 in 2013
S04 Susui Expressway	宿遂高速	Suqian - Suiping	Suining (JS border)	HE border		
S05 Xuantong Expressway	宣桐高速	Xuancheng - Tonglu	Dangtu (JS border)	Ningguo (ZJ border)		Known as S05 in Anhui and S29 in Zhejiang
S06 Sudeng Expressway	宿登高速	Suzhou - Dengfeng	Suzhou	Bozhou (HA border)		Became a portion of G1516 in 2013
S06 Sibeng Expressway	泗蚌高速	Sihong - Bengbu	Wuhe (JS border)	Bengbu		Under construction; known as S06 in Anhui and S20 in Jiangsu
S07 Xuming Expressway	徐明高速	Xuzhou - Mingguang	Sixian (JS border)	Mingguang		Known as S07 in Anhui and S65 in Jiangsu
S08 Huaibo Expressway	淮亳高速	Huainan - Bozhou	Huainan	Bozhou		
S09 Minghe Expressway	明合高速	Mingguang - Hefei	Mingguang	Feixi		
S10 Yanghuai Expressway	揚淮高速	Yangzhou - Huainan	Lai'an	Huainan		
S11 Chaohuang Expressway	巢黄高速	Chaohu - Huangshan	Chaohu	Huangshan	56 km	
S12 Chuxin Expressway	滁新高速	Chuzhou - Xincai	Lai'an	Fuyang (HA border)		
S14 Chuhe Expressway	滁合高速	Chuzhou - Hefei	Chuzhou	Feixi		
S16 Hezhou Expressway	合周高速	Hefei - Zhoukou	Hefei	Jieshou (HA border)		
S17 Benghe Expressway	蚌合高速	Bengbu - Hefei	Bengbu	Hefei		
S18 Yuewu Expressway	岳武高速	Yuexi - Wuhan	Yuexi	Yuexi (HB border)		Became a portion of G42S in 2013, now a portion of G4221
S18 Ninghe Expressway		Nanjing - Hefei	Hexian (JS border)	Hefei		
S19 Sumeng Expressway	宿阜高速	Suzhou - Mengcheng	Suzhou	Mengcheng		Planned
S20 Changgu Expressway	长固高速	Changfeng - Gushi	Changfeng	Gushixian (HE border)		
S21 Jidang Expressway	济砀高速	Jining - Dangshan	Dangshan (SD border)	Dangshan (HA border)		Became a portion of G3W in 2013, now a portion of G0321
S21 Huohuai Expressway	霍怀高速	Huoshan - Huaining	Huoshan	Huaining		
S22 Tiantian Expressway	天天高速	Tianchang - Tianzhushan	Tianchang	Tianzhushan		
S23 Dangqi Expressway	砀祁高速	Dangshan - Qimen	Huaibei (HA border)	Qimen (JX border)		Became a portion of G3W in 2013, now a portion of G0321
S24 Changlu Expressway	常庐高速	Changshu - Lujiang	Ma'anshan (JS border)	Lujiang		Became a portion of G42S in 2013, now a portion of G4221
S24 Hanghe Expressway	杭合高速					
S25 Xufu Expressway	徐阜高速	Xuzhou - Fuyang	Xiaoxian (JS border)	Fuyang		
S26 Wutong Expressway	无桐高速					
S27 Andong Expressway	安东高速	Anqing - Dongzhi	Anqing	Dongzhi		Former portion of G35
S28 Liwu Expressway	溧芜高速	Liyang - Wuhu	Wuhu (JS border)	Wuhu		
S30 Tongshang Expressway		Tongling - Shangcheng	Tongling	Shangcheng		
S32 Taiqi Expressway	太蕲高速	Taihu - Qichun	Taihu	Taihu (HB border)		
S33 Fuhuai Expressway	阜淮高速	Fuyang - Huaibin	Fuyang	Huaibin		
S35 Supeng Expressway	宿彭高速					
S36 Xuanchi Expressway	宣池高速	Xuancheng - Chizhou	Xuancheng	Chizhou		Planned
S37 Jinyi Expressway	金仪高速					
S38 Dongpeng Expressway	东彭高速	Dongzhi - Pengze	Dongzhi	Dongzhi (JX border)		Known as S38 in Anhui and S20 in Jiangxi
S39 Ningyuan Second Expressway	宁宣二高速					
S40 Ningzong Expressway	宁枞高速	Ningguo - Zongyang	Ningguo	Zongyangxian		Planned
S42 Huangfu Expressway	黄浮高速	Huangshan - Fuliang	Huangshan	Qimen (JX border)		
S44 Anjing Expressway	安旌高速	Anji - Jingde	Anji (ZJ border)	Jingdexian		
S46 Zhanggao Expressway	长高高速	Changxing - Gaochun	ZJ border	JS border		
S48 Jianhuang Expressway	建黄高速	Jiande - Huangshan	Shexian (ZJ border)	Shexian		Became a portion of G4012 in 2013
S48 Heye Expressway	合叶高速	Hefei - Yeji				
S61 Huaiyong Expressway	淮永高速					
S62 Boyan Expressway	亳郸高速	Bozhou - Yancheng	Bozhou	Yancheng		
S63 Huaifeng Expressway	懷鳳高速	Huaiyuan - Fengtai	Huaiyuan	Fengtai		
S64 Anning Expressway	安宁高速	Anji - Ningguo	Ningguo (ZJ border)	Ningguo		Became a portion of S44
S64 Xuming Expressway	盱明高速	Xuyi - Mingguang	JS border	Sishan		
S65 Huojin Expressway	霍金高速					
S66 Huangqi Expressway	黄祁高速					
S67 Huiyi Expressway	徽黟高速					
S68 Jingji Expressway	旌绩高速					
S81 Xuancheng Ring Expressway	宣城绕城高速公路	Xuancheng Ring				
S82 Anqing Ring Expressway		Anqing Ring				Planned
S83 Huangshan Ring Expressway		Huangshan Ring				Planned
S90 Feidong Branch Line						
S91 Lukou Branch Line	路口支线	Lukou Branch				
S92 Hefei Branch Line						
S93 Xinqiao Airport Expressway		Xinqiao Airport	Hefei	Xinqiao Airport		
S94 Tiantangzhai Branch Line						
S95 Fengyang Branch Line	凤阳支线	Fengyang Branch	Fengyang	Bengbu		
S96 Erba Branch Line						
S97 Anqing Branch Line	安庆支线	Anqing Branch	Huaining (G4221)	Huaining (G50)		Under construction
S98 Chuzhou Branch Line	滁州支线	Chuzhou Branch	Quanjiao	Chuzhou		
S99 Susong Branch Line	宿松支线	Susong Branch				
S0511 Anning Expressway	安宁高速	Anji - Ningguo	Ningguo (ZJ border)	Ningguo		Renumbered to S64 (now S44)
S0711 Sibeng Expressway	泗蚌高速	Sihong - Bengbu	Wuhe (JS border)	Bengbu		Renumbered to S06
S0712 Xuming Expressway	盱明高速	Xuyi - Mingguang	Mingguang (JS border)	Mingguang		Renumbered to S64
S1111 Ningqi Expressway	宁祁高速	Ningguo - Qimen	Ningguo	Qimen		
S1211 Fuhuang Expressway	阜潢高速	Fuyang - Huangchuan	Fuyang	Huangchuan (HA border)		
S1411 Hefei Liaison Line	合肥联络线	Hefei Liaison	Hefei (S14)	Hefei (G40)		
S1711 Wubeng Expressway	五蚌高速	Wuhe - Bengbu	Wuhe	Bengbu		Became a portion of S0711 in 2016
S2211 Xinyang Expressway	新扬高速	Xinyi - Yangzhou	Huanghuatang (JS border)	Tianchang (JS border)		Renumbered to S01 in 2017
S2212 Linhe Expressway	临合高速	Linyi - Hefei	Dingyuan (SD border)	Hefei		
S2213 Lailu Expressway	来六高速	Lai'an - Luhe	Lai'an	Lai'an (JS border)		
S2214 Taishanlu Bridge	泰山路大桥	Taishanlu Bridge	Hanshan	Wuhu		
S2215 Anjiu Expressway	安九高速	Anqing - Jiujiang	Anqing	Susong (JX border)		
S2216 Hewu Expressway	和无高速	Hexian - Wuwei	Hanshan	Wuwei		
S2711 Haikou Bridge	海口大桥	Haikou Bridge	Anqing (S27)	Haikou		

- S8 was originally Mengbo Expressway (蒙亳高速)
- S22 was originally Tianqian Expressway (天潜高速)
- S24 was originally Changhe Expressway (常合高速)
- S36 was originally Xuandong Expressway (宣东高速)
- S0711 was originally Siwu Expressway (泗五高速)
- S1111 was originally Ningjing Expressway (宁旌高速)
- S2212 was originally Ninghe Expressway (宁和高速)

== Beijing ==
Number and name	Chinese name	Route	Origin	Terminus	Length	Notes
S11 Jingcheng Expressway	京承高速	Beijing - Chengde			132 km	Portion of G45
S12 Airport Expressway	机场高速公路	Beijing	Beijing	Beijing Capital Int'l Airport	19 km	
S15 Jingjin Expressway	京津高速	Beijing - Tianjin				
S26 Changgu Expressway	昌谷高速	Changping - Pinggu				
S28 Northern Airport Expressway	机场北线高速		G45	Beijing Capital Int'l Airport	11 km	
S32 Jingping Expressway	京平高速公路	Beijing - Pinggu	Beijing	Pinggu (TJ border)		
S35 Jingmi Expressway	京密高速	Beijing - Miyun				
S36 Jingqin Expressway	京秦高速	Beijing - Qinhuangdao				Redesignated as G0121
S41 Micai Expressway	密采高速					
S46 Jingtong-Tongyan Connecting Line	京通通燕联络线					Portion of G102
S50 5th Ring Expressway	五环路				98 km	
S51 Airport 2nd Expressway	机场二高速	Beijing	Beijing	Beijing Capital Int'l Airport	12 km	
S60 6th Ring Road Expressway	六环路					Redesignated as G4501
S63 Jingli Expressway			Beijing	Yanqing (HB border)		
S66 Jingkun Connecting Line	京昆联络线	Jingkun Connecting	Fangshan	G5		
S76 Yancai Expressway	燕采高速	Yanshan - Caiyu	Yanshan	Caiyu		
S80 Mizhuo Expressway	密涿高速	Miyun - Zhuozhou	Miyun	Zhuozhou		Portions of G95 and S3201
S86 Yuncai Expressway	云采高速	Yunling - Caiyu	Yunling	Caiyu		

== Beijing-Tianjin-Hebei inter-provincial ==
All route numbers are four digits and the first digit is always 3.

- For radial routes: arranged in ascending order clockwise beginning at true north; the final digit is 1 (S3xx1).
- For north–south routes: arranged in ascending order from east to west; the final digit is 5 (S3xx5).
- For east–west routes: arranged in ascending order from north to south; the final digit is 0 (S3xx0).
- No two routes can have the same number.

Number and name	Chinese name	Route	Origin	Terminus	Length	Notes
S3105 Chenglang Expressway	承廊高速		Chengde	Langfang	198 km	
S3201 Jingjijin Expressway	京蓟津高速		Beijing	Tianjin	175 km	
S3205 Chengjin Expressway	承津高速					Planned
S3300 Daxing Airport North Expressway	大兴机场北线高速		Beijing	Daxing Int'l Airport	25 km	Tianjin section in planning stages
S3301 Jingjin Expressway	京津高速		Beijing	Tianjin	147 km	Portions of Beijing S15 and Tianjin S30
S3305 Jincang Expressway	津沧高速					Portion of Tianjin S6
S3500 Tanglang Expressway	唐廊高速					Officially designated as Tianjin S20
S3501 Daxing Airport Expressway	大兴机场高速		Beijing	Daxing Int'l Airport	35 km	
S3505 Jingha-Jingjin Connecting Line	京哈京津联络线					Planned
S3600 Jinghu-Jingtai Connecting Line	京沪京台联络线					
S3601 Jingxiong Expressway	京雄高速	Beijing - Xiong'an			97 km	Portion of G0424
S3701 Jingyu Expressway	京蔚高速		Beijing	Yu County	184 km	
S3801 Jingli Expressway	京礼高速		Beijing	Chongli	174 km	
S3901 Jingde Expressway	京德高速		Beijing	Dezhou	280 km	

== Chongqing ==
- All radial routes are single-digit.
- West-east routes end in even numbers and north-south routes end in odd numbers.
- Ring roads begin with the digit "8".

Number and name	Chinese name	Route	Origin	Terminus	Length	Notes
S1 Yulin Expressway	渝邻复线高速	Chongqing-Linshui	Yubei (Chongqing)	Linshui	45 km	
S2 Yuba Expressway	渝巴高速	Chongqing-Bazhong				Became a portion of G4223
S3 Yuchang Expressway	渝湘复线高速	Chongqing-Changsha	Yubei (Chongqing)	Changsha	280 km	
S4 Yuzun Expressway	渝遵高速					
S5 Yuchi Expressway	渝赤高速	Chongqing-Chishui	Yubei (Chongqing)	Chishui	65 km	
S6 Jianglu North Line Expressway (Chongqing Section)	渝泸高速	Jiangjin-Luzhou	Taojia	Xianlong	54 km	Known as Yulu Expressway in Chongqing
S7 Yulu Second Line Expressway	渝泸复线高速	Chongqing-Luzhou	Yubei (Chongqing)	Luzhou	70 km	
S8 Yule Expressway	渝乐高速	Chongqing-Leshan	Yubei (Chongqing)	Leshan	48 km	
S9 Yuzi Expressway	渝资高速	Chongqing-Ziyang	Yubei (Chongqing)	Ziyang		
S10 Xiliang Expressway					224 km	
S11 Zhenwujian Expressway	镇巫建高速					Became a portion of G6911
S11 Chengwu Expressway						
S12 Kaixuan Expressway						
S13 Chengxuan Expressway						
S13 Dawanli Expressway	达万利高速					Became a portion of G5012
S14 Kaikai Expressway	开开高速				32 km	
S15 Yunli Expressway						
S15 Liangqian Expressway	梁黔高速	Liangping - Qianjiang				Became a portion of G5515
S16 Qianwu Expressway						
S17 Liangshi Expressway						
S18 Xiuyan Expressway						
S19 Kailiang Expressway						
S20 Changtong Tourism Expressway					53 km	
S21 Xiusong Expressway	秀松高速				30 km	
S21 Hebijin Expressway	合璧津高速	Hechuan - Bishan - Jiangjin	Hechuan	HU border		Absorbed into S49
S22 Fuchang Expressway Third Ring Branch					13 km	
S23 Youxiu Expressway						
S23 Tongrong Expressway						Renumbered to S55
S24 Fengba Expressway						
S25 Youyan Expressway	酉沿高速				31 km	
S26 Pingtong Expressway					26 km	
S26 Youyan Expressway	酉沿高速					Renumbered to S25
S27 Liqian Expressway					42 km	
S28 Wutong Expressway					50 km	
S29 Shipeng Expressway					72 km	
S30 Shuangqian Expressway					29 km	
S31 Dianwu Expressway					197 km	
S32 Yusui Expressway					197 km	
S33 Taobai Expressway					22 km	
S34 Danei Expressway					32 km	
S35 Changba Expressway					72 km	
S36 Yongda Expressway					38 km	
S37 Nanliang Expressway					98 km	
S38 Dashuang Expressway					47 km	
S39 Yuchang Second Line Expressway					52 km	
S41 Wanzheng Expressway					72 km	
S43 Wantong Expressway					26 km	
S45 Qixi Expressway					32 km	
S47 Changjiang Branch Expressway	澄江支线高速	Changjiang Branch				
S49 Hejin Expressway	合津高速				210 km	
S51 Biyong Expressway					27 km	
S51 Danei Expressway						Renumbered to S34
S53 Yonghe Expressway					39 km	
S55 Tongrong Expressway					139 km	
S57 Wugu Expressway					27 km	
S63 Xiusong Expressway	秀松高速					Renumbered to S21
S80 Chongqing 3rd Ring Road						Redesignated as G9909 in 2022
S81 Rongchang Ring Expressway		Rongchang City Ring	Rongchang Ring		20 km	
S82 Nanchuan Ring Expressway		Nanchuan City Ring	Nanchuan Ring		11 km	
S83 Qijiang Ring Expressway		Qijiang City Ring	Qijiang Ring		34 km	

== Fujian ==
Fujian Expressway Numbering Plan 2009-2030
Fujian Expressway Network Plan 2016-2030

Number and name	Chinese name	Route	Origin	Terminus	Length	Notes
S10 Ningguang Expressway	宁光高速公路	Ningde - Guangze	Ningde	Guangze		Redesignated as G7021 in 2022
S11 Fuxia Expressway	福厦高速	Fuzhou - Xiamen	Fuqing	Xiang'an		Former S1502
S12 Shajin Expressway		Shaxian - Kinmen	Shaxian	Kinmen		
S12 Puyong Expressway	莆永高速	Putian - Yongding	Xinghuawan	Yongding (GD border)		Became a portion of S21; now part of G1532
S13 Pingmei Expressway	平梅高速	Pingtan - Meizhou	Pingtan	Shanghang (GD border)		Former S1522/S0326
S15 Zini Expressway	紫泥高速	Fujing - Haicheng	Fujing (G15)	Haicheng (G15)		Formerly G15E
S20 Wusha Expressway	武沙高速公路	Wuxi - Shaxian	Wuxi	Shaxian		Redesignated as G7013 in 2022
S21 Zhengyong Expressway	政永高速	Zhenghe - Yongding	Zhenghe (ZJ border)	Yongding (GD border)		Former S0313
S30 Yongzhang Expressway	永漳高速	Yong'an - Zhangzhou	Yong'an	Zhangzhou		Former S7211 (and S17 before that)
S30 Xiasha Expressway	廈沙高速	Xiamen - Shaxian	Xiamen	Shaxian		Redesignated as G2517 in 2013
S31 Puwu Expressway		Puchang - Wuping	Puchang	Wuping		Former S0311
S35 Fuzhao Expressway	福诏高速	Fuding - Zhao'an	Shacheng (ZJ border)	Zhao'an (GD border)		Renumbered to G15W3 in 2013, now a portion of G1523
S40 Zhangwu Expressway		Zhanghou - Wuping	Guleigang	Wuping (JX border)		Former S1591, S1525 and S1522
S50 Fuzhou Connecting Line	福州连接线	Zhangzhou - Meizhou	Zhangzhou	Pinghe (GD border)	11 km	Former S7621
S51 Fuzhou Connecting Line	福州连接线	Fuzhou Connecting	Fuzhou	Fuzhou (G15)	11 km	Former X101 and S1521
S52 Fuzhou South Connecting Line	福州南连接线	Fuzhou South Connecting Line	Fuzhou	Fuzhou (G15)	14 km	Former S7021
S53 Yuping Expressway	渔平高速	Yuxi - Pingtan	Yuxi	Pingtan	54 km	
S55 Xiuyong Expressway	秀永高速	Xiuyu - Yongchun	Xiuyu	Yongchun		Former portion of S10
S56 Nanhui Expressway		Nan'an - Hui'an	Nan'an	Hui'an		Former S1502
S57 Anxi Connecting Line	安溪连接线	Anxi Connecting	Nan'an	Anxi		Former S7221
S58 Jinchang Expressway	晋长高速	Jinjiang - Changtai	Jinjiang	Xiang'an		Former G1502 and S1573
S59 Tongzhao Expressway		Tong'an - Zhaoyin	Tong'an	Zhaoyin		
S61 Zhangzhou North Connecting Line	漳州北连接线	Zhangzhou North Connecting	Zhangzhou	Zhangzhou (G76)	25 km	Former S1524
S62 Pinghe Connecting Line		Pinghe Connecting	Pinghe	GD border		Portion of S63
S63 Guping Expressway		Gulei Port - Pinghe	Gulei Port	Pinghe		
S64 Dongshan Connecting Line	东山连接线	Dongshan Connecting	Dongshan (G15)	Dongshan	14 km	
S66 Shanghang Connecting Line		Shanghang Connecting	Gushi (G25)	Xidaohu (G76)	36 km	Former S2513
S67 Yongding Connecting Line	永定连接 线	Yongding Connecting	Yongding (S12)	Yongding		Former S1023
S68 Sanming North Connecting Line	三明北东连接线	Sanming North Connecting	Sanming (G25)	Sanming		Former S2525
S69 Sanming South Connecting Line	三明南连接线	Sanming South Connecting	Sanming	Shaxian	44 km	
S76 Dongxiao Expressway		Juzhou - Jingyuankou	Juzhou (G76)	Jingyuankou (G76)		One section formerly G76S1
S81 Fuzhou Airport Expressway	福州机场高速	Fuzhou	Fuzhou	Fuzhou Airport		Former S1531
S91 Kemen Port Expressway	可门疏港高速	Kemen Port	Lianjiang	Kemengang	10 km	
S0311 Pujian Expressway	浦建高速	Pucheng - Jianning	Pucheng (ZJ border)	Jianning (JX border)		Became a portion of S31 in 2017
S0312 Shaoguang Expressway	邵光高速	Shaowu - Guangze	Shaowu	Guangze (JX border)		Became a portion of S10 in 2014, now G7021
S0313 Zhenggu Expressway	政古高速	Zhenghe - Gutian	Zhenghe	Gutian		Became a portion of S21 in 2014
S0314 Ninggu Expressway	宁古高速	Ningde - Gutian	Ningde	Gutian		Became a portion of S10
S0321 Wuyishan Connecting Line	武夷山连接线	Wuyishan Connecting	Shibei	Wuyishan		
S0322 Wuyi Connecting Line	武夷连接线	Wuyi Connecting	Jianyang	Wuyi		
S0323 Nanping Connecting Line	南平连接线	Nanping Connecting	Gutian	Nanping		Became a portion of S10 in 2014, now G7021
S0324 Minqing Connecting Line	闽清连接线	Minqing Connecting	Gutian	Minqing		Became a portion of S13
S0326 Pingtan Connecting Line	平潭连接线	Pingtan Connecting	Pingtan (G3)	Pingtan		Became portions of S11 and S40
S1023 Yongding Connecting Line	永定连接 线	Yongding Connecting	Yongding (S12)	Yongding		Renumbered to S67
S1111 Fuping Expressway	福平高速	Fuqing - Pingtan	Fuqing	Pingtan		
S1112 Xiuyong Expressway	秀永高速	Xiuyu - Yongchun	Xiuyu	Yongchun		Renumbered to S55
S1113 Jinchang Expressway	晋长高速	Jinjiang - Changtai	Jinjiang	Xiang'an		Renumbered to S58
S1502 Quanzhou City Ring Expressway	泉州绕城高速	Quanzhou City Ring	Quanzhou Ring			Renumbered to "G1502" (not an official NTHS number); removed in 2022
S1511 Fushou Expressway	福寿高速	Fu'an - Shouning	Fu'an	Shouning (ZJ border)		Became a portion of G4012 in 2013
S1512 Xingyou Expressway	兴尤高速	Xinghuawan - Youxi	Xinghuawan	Youxi		Became a portion of G1517 in 2013
S1513 Quanjin Expressway	泉金高速	Quanzhou - Kinmen	Quanzhou	Kinmen (Quemoy) (ROC Taiwan)	10 km	
S1515 Xiajin Expressway	厦金高速	Xiamen - Kinmen	Xiamen	Kinmen (Quemoy) (ROC Taiwan)	33 km	
S1516 Quanxiazhang Expressway	泉厦漳高速	Quanzhou - Xiamen - Zhangzhou	Shishi	Zhangzhou		Became a portion of S11 in 2016
S1516 Guping Expressway	古平高速	Guleigang - Pinghe	Guleigang	Pinghe		Renumbered to S63
S1518 Pingmei Expressway	平梅高速	Pinghe - Meizhou	Pinghe	Pinghe (GD border)		
S1519 Da'an Expressway	大安高速	Datian - Anxi	Guangping	Anxi		
S1521 Fuzhou Connecting Line	福州连接线	Fuzhou Connecting	Fuzhou	Fuzhou (G15)	11 km	Renumbered to S51
S1522 Yuping Expressway	渔平高速	Yuxi - Pingtan	Yuxi	Pingtan	54 km	Was officially known as S0326, became a portion of S40
S1523 Xiamen Connecting Line	厦门连接线	Xiamen Connecting	Xiamen (G15)	Xiamen		Became a portion of G2517 in 2017
S1524 Zhangzhou North Connecting Line	漳州北连接线	Zhangzhou North Connecting	Zhangzhou	Zhangzhou (G76)	25 km	Renumbered to S61
S1525 Zhangzhou South Connecting Line	漳州南连接线	Zhangzhou South Connecting	Longhai	Zhangzhou		Became a portion of S40 in 2016
S1526 Dongshan Connecting Line	东山连接线	Dongshan Connecting	Dongshan (G15)	Dongshan	14 km	Renumbered to S64
S1527 Zhangzhou East Connecting Line	漳州东连接线	Zhangzhou East Connecting	Haicang	Longhai		
S1531 Fuzhou Airport Expressway	福州机场高速	Fuzhou Airport	Fuzhou	Fuzhou Airport		Renumbered to S81 in 2019
S1532 Xiamen Airport Expressway	厦门机场高速	Xiamen Airport	Xiamen	Xiamen Airport	17 km	
S1533 Fuzhou Airport 2nd Expressway	福州机场二高速	Fuzhou Airport 2nd	Changle	Fuzhou Airport		Under construction, currently no number
S1541 Xinan Port Expressway	溪南疏港高速	Xinan Port	Wanwu	Xinangang	35 km	
S1551 Jiangyin Port Expressway	江阴疏港高速	Jiangyin Port	Yuxi	Jiangyingang		Became a portion of S11 in 2016
S1552 Niutouwei Port Expressway	牛头尾疏港高速	Niutouwei Port	Pingtan	Niutouweigang	15 km	
S1553 Luoyuanwan Port Expressway	罗源湾疏港高速	Luoyuanwan Port	Luoyuan	Luoyuanwangang	15 km	
S1554 Kemen Port Expressway	可门疏港高速	Kemen Port	Lianjiang	Kemengang	10 km	Renumbered to S91
S1571 Xiaocuo Port Expressway	肖厝疏港高速	Xiaocuo Port	Putian	Xiaocuogang	9 km	
S1572 Douwei Port Expressway	斗尾疏港高速	Douwei Port	Hui'an	Douweigang		
S1573 Weitou Port Expressway	围头疏港高速	Weitou Port	Jinjiang	Weitougang	31 km	Became a portion of S58
S1581 Dongdu Port Expressway	东渡疏港高速	Dongdu Port	Xiamen	Zhaoyingang	20 km	
S1591 Zhaoyin Port Expressway	招银疏港高速	Zhaoyin Port	Haicang	Zhaoyin	24 km	Became portions of S40 and S59
S2511 Sanyou Expressway	三尤高速	Sanming - Youxi	Sanming	Youxi		Became a portion of G1517
S2512 Lianchang Expressway	连长高速	Liancheng - Changting	Liancheng	Changting		
S2513 Shangjiao Expressway	蛟上高速	Jiaoyang - Shanghang	Jiaoyang	Shanghang	38 km	Renumbered to S66
S2521 Pucheng Connecting Line	浦城连接线	Pucheng Connecting	Songxi	Pucheng		
S2522 Zhenghe Connecting Line	政和连接线	Zhenghe Connecting	Songxi	Zhenghe		
S2523 Nanping East Connecting Line	南平东连接线	Nanping East Connecting	Nanping	Taqian		
S2524 Shunchang Connecting Line	顺昌连接线	Shunchang Connecting	Nanping	Shunchang		Became a portion of S10 in 2014, now G7021
S2524 Sanming North Connecting Line	三明北东连接线	Sanming North Connecting	Sanming (G25)	Sanming		Renumbered to S68
S2525 Sanming South Connecting Line	三明南连接线	Sanming South Connecting	Sanming	Shaxian	44 km	Renumbered to S69
S2526 Mingxi Connecting Line	明溪连接线	Mingxi Connecting	Sanming	Mingxi		Became a portion of G1517 in 2013
S3553 Luoyuanwan Port Expressway	罗源湾疏港高速	Luoyuanwan Port	Luoyuan	Luoyuanwangang		Renumbered to S1553
S3554 Kemen Port Expressway	可门疏港高速	Kemen Port	Lianjiang	Kemengang		Renumbered to S1554, now S91
S7021 Fuzhou South Connecting Line	福州南连接线	Fuzhou South Connecting Line	Fuzhou	Fuzhou (G15)	14 km	Renumbered to S52
S7022 Nanyu Connecting Line	南屿连接线	Nanyu Connecting	Fuzhou	Nanyu		
S7211 Yongzhang Expressway	永漳高速	Yong'an - Zhangzhou	Yong'an	Zhangzhou		Originally numbered as S17; renumbered to S30 in 2016
S7211 Qingsan Expressway	清三高速	Qingliu - Sanyuan	Qingliu	Sanyuan		
S7221 Anxi Connecting Line	安溪连接线	Anxi Connecting	Nan'an	Anxi		Renumbered to S57
S7621 Xiamen South Connecting Line	厦门南连接线	Xiamen South Connecting Line	Xiamen	Haicang	8 km	Became portions of S50 and S59
S7622 Longyan South Connecting Line	龙岩南连接线	Longyan South Connecting	Longyan (G76)	Longyan (S13)		
S7623 Longyan East Connecting Line	龙岩东连接线	Longyan East Connecting	Longyan (G76)	Longyan (S13)		Known as East Line Expressway, currently no number

- S1522 was originally Pingtan Connecting Line (平潭连接线)
- S2525 was originally Sanming Connecting Line (三明连接线)

== Gansu ==
- Ring roads have a "0" for the first digit and increase from east to west.
- East-west routes end in "0" and increase from north to south.
- North-south routes end in "5" and increase from east to west.
- Connecting routes are split into west-east and north-south.
  - North-south routes end in an odd digit (except for "5") and increase from east to west.
  - East-west routes end in an even digit (except for "0") and increase from north to south.

Gansu Provincial Road Network Planning (2013-2030)

Number and name	Chinese name	Route	Origin	Terminus	Length	Notes
S01 Lanzhou Outer City Ring Expressway	兰州外环绕城高速	Lanzhou Outer Ring				
S02 Piangliang City Ring Expressway	平凉绕城高速	Pingliang Ring				
S03 Tianshui City Ring Expressway	天水绕城高速	Tianshui City Ring				
S04 Wuwei City Ring Expressway	武威绕城高速	Wuwei City Ring				
S05 Zhangye City Ring Expressway	张掖绕城高速	Zhangye City Ring				
S06 Jiujia City Ring	酒嘉绕城高速	Jiujia City Ring				
S10 Zhangma Expressway	张马高速	Zhangye-Mazongshan	Zhangye	Mazongshan	510 km	
S11 Jinghua Expressway	泾华高速	Jingyuan-Huating	Jingyuan (NX border)	Huating	11 km	
S12 Desha Expressway	徳沙高速	Delingha-Aksai	Delingha	Aksai	288 km	
S13 Zhongchuan Airport Expressway	中川机场高速		Lanzhou	Zhongchuan Airport	25 km	
S14 Qinwei Expressway	陇渭高速	Qin'an-Weiyuan	Qin'an	Weiyuan	131 km	
S15 Wuping Expressway	吴平高速	Wuqi-Piangliang	Wuqi (SX border)	Piangliang	257 km	
S16 Tianbei Expressway	麦天高速	Qinzhou-Tianshui	Qinzhou (Tianshui)	Beidao	13 km	
S17 Ayong Expressway	阿永高速	Alxa-Yongchang	Alxa (NM border)	Yongchang		
S18 Zhangsu Expressway	张肃高速	Zhangye-Sunan	Zhangye	Sunan	69 km	
S19 Pengyong Expressway	临东高速	Pengyang-Yongshou	Linxia	Dongxiang	25 km	
S20 Jiaruo Expressway	嘉若高速	Jiayuguan-Ruoqiang	Jiayuguan	Ruoqiang	504 km	
S21 Pingqian Expressway	白新高速	Pingliang-Qianyang	Baiyin	Lanzhou	52 km	
S22 Baizhong Expressway	白新高速	Baiyin-Lanzhou	Baiyin	Lanzhou	52 km	
S23 Pingliang Airport Expressway	白新高速				15 km	
S24 Lanyong Expressway	兰永高速	Lanzhou-Yongjing	Lanzhou	Yongjing	38 km	
S25 Jingcheng Expressway	静天高速	Jingning-Tianshui	Jingning	Tianshui	299 km	
S26 Zhengyu Expressway	正榆高速	Zhangning-Yulinzi	Zhangning	Yulinzi	22 km	
S27 Tianliang Expressway	灵华高速	Tianshui-Liangdang	Lingtai	Huating	140 km	
S28 Linghua Expressway	灵华高速	Lingtai-Huating	Lingtai	Huating	140 km	
S29 Kangning Expressway	雷白高速	Kangxian-Ningqiang	Kangxian	Ningqiang	341 km	
S30 Leibai Expressway	雷白高速	Leijiajiao-Baiyin	Leijiajiao	Baiyin	341 km	
S31 Longqin Expressway	临积高速	Longde-Qin'an	Longde	Qin'an	53 km	
S32 Linda Expressway	临积高速	Linxia-Dahejia	Linxia	Dahejia	53 km	
S33 Wenqing Expressway	临积高速	Wenxian-Qingchuan	Linxia	Jishishan	41 km	
S34 Linxun Expressway	临循高速	Linxia-Xunhua	Linxia	Xunhua (QH border)	38 km	
S35 Jingli Expressway	景礼高速	Jingtai-Lixian	Jingtai	Lixian	449 km	
S36 Linguang Expressway	临广高速	Lintao-Guanghe	Lintao	Guanghe	47 km	
S37 Jingmin Expressway	夏王高速	Jingning-Minxian	Xiahe	Wangge'ertang	35 km	
S38 Wangxia Expressway	夏王高速	Wangge'ertang-Xiahe	Wangge'ertang	Xiahe	42 km	
S39 Xihui Expressway	夏王高速	Xiji-Huining	Xiji	Huining	42 km	
S40 Qinglan Expressway	庆兰高速	Qingyang-Lanzhou	Qingyang	Lanzhou	311 km	
S41 Zhoujiu Expressway	漳殪高速	Zhouqu-Jiuzhaigou	Zhangxian	Yihuqiao	15 km	
S42 Wuzhang Expressway	漳殪高速	Wushan-Zhangxian	Zhangxian	Yihuqiao	57 km	
S43 Dingwei Expressway	康望高速	Dingxi-Weiyuan	Dingxi	Wangguan	54 km	
S44 Jinyu Expressway	康望高速	Jinta-Yumen	Jinta	Yumen	99 km	
S45 Lujiu Expressway	碌久高速	Luqu-Jiuzhi	Luqu	Jiuzhi	74 km	
S50 Longxun Expressway	陇循高速	Longxian-Xunhua	Longxian	Xunhua	542 km	
S55 Axi Expressway	阿西高速	Alxa-Xining	Alxa (NM border)	Xining (QH border)	313 km	
S60 Fengtong Expressway	凤同高速	Fengxian-Tongren	Fengxian	Tongren	557 km	
S61 Leixi Expressway	凤同高速	Leitai-Xiying	Leitai	Xiying	123 km	
S62 Xinglongshan Expressway	凤同高速				56 km	
S63 Madun Expressway	凤同高速	Mazongshan-Dunhuang	Mazongshan	Dunhuang	278 km	
S64 Xidang Expressway	凤同高速	Xihe-Dangchang	Xihe	Dangchang	100 km	
S65 Hangjiu Expressway	航酒高速	Hangtiancheng-Jiuquan	Hangtiancheng (NM border)	Jiuquan	220 km	
S66 Liangjiu Expressway	凤同高速	Liangshui-Jiuzhaigou	Liangshui	Jiuzhaigou	557 km	
S68 Yuwen Expressway	航酒高速	Yujiawan-Wenxian	Hangtiancheng (NM border)	Jiuquan	71 km	
S70 Lüelang Expressway	略郎高速	Lüeyang-Langmusi	Lüeyang	Langmusi	291 km	

Former numbers (before 2013):

- S1 Lanzhou-Yingpanguan / Lanying Expressway
- S2 Lanzhou-Langmusi / Lanlang Expressway
- S11 Qingcheng - Wuqi / Qingwu Expressway
- S13 Pingliang - Baoji / Pingbao Expressway
- S15 Pingliang - Wudu / Pingwu Expressway
- S10 Wuwei-Jinchang / Wujin Expressway
- S12 Baiyin-Zhongchuan Airport / Baizhong Expressway

== Guangxi ==
- North-south and east-west routes have numbers of 10-69, with odd numbers for north-south routes and even numbers for east-west routes.
- City ring routes have four digits, made of the main line number, the number "0" and a sequence number.
- Parallel routes have four digits, made of the main line number, the number "2" and a sequence number.
- Connecting routes have numbers of 70-89, arranged in order from north to south and east to west. A four digit number can also be used, and it consists of the main line number, the number "1", and a sequence number.
- Regional ring routes have numbers of 90-99.

Number and name	Chinese name	Route	Origin	Terminus	Length	Notes
S10 Guansan Expressway						
S11 Longcen Expressway						
S13 Fuzhong Expressway						
S15 Quanrong Expressway						
S17 Wuqin Expressway						
S20 Guangui Expressway						Planned
S21 Zitie Expressway	资铁高速	Ziyuan - Tieshanggang	Ziyuan (HU border)	Tieshanggang		Became a portion of G59
S22 Guihe Expressway						
S24 Tianxi Expressway						
S26 Lianhe Expressway						
S28 Xinwu Expressway						
S30 Hexi Expressway						
S31 Sannan Expressway						
S32 Wule Expressway						
S34 Liujin Expressway						
S35 Luqin Expressway						
S40 Wushuo Expressway		Wuzhou - Shuolong	Wuzhou	Shuolong (Vietnam border)		
S42 Cennan Expressway						
S43 Binqin Expressway						
S45 Beinan Expressway						
S48 Nanxin Expressway						
S50 Qingping Expressway						
S50 Cenluo Expressway						Became a portion of G2518
S51 Huangliu Expressway						
S52 Wuping Expressway						
S53 Longnan Expressway						Became a portion of G7221 in 2022
S57 Nantong Expressway						
S60 Hena Expressway						
S60 Qinchong Expressway						
S61 E'nan Expressway						Became a portion of G7522 in 2022
S62 Shuichongai Expressway		Chongshui - Shuikou - Aidian	Chongshui	Aidian (Vietnam border)		
S63 Nanbei Expressway						Became a portion of G7511
S64 Tiefang Coastal Expressway						
S65 Bayou Expressway						
S66 Dongping Yanbian Expressway						
S69 Cenfu Expressway						
S70 Guihe Expressway						
S71 Congli Expressway						
S71 Tianlong Expressway	天峨-龍邦高速	Tian'e - Longbang	Tian'e (GZ border)	Longbang (Vietnam border)		Became a portion of G69
S72 Luluo Expressway						
S73 Guangxi Section of Heli Expressway						
S74 Xinwu Expressway						
S75 Wuxin Expressway						
S76 Guicen Expressway						
S77 Beiqing Expressway						
S78 Boqing Expressway						
S79 Yuzhan Expressway						
S80 Guizhan Expressway						
S81 Nanzhan Expressway						
S82 Yuqin Expressway						
S83 Pinsi Expressway						
S84 Linhang Expressway						
S85 Sifang Expressway						
S86 Pingmeng Port Expressway						
S87 Longguang Expressway						
S88 Nanning Wuxu Airport 2nd Expressway						
S90 Nanning Outer Ring Expressway						
S91 Guilin Outer Ring Expressway						
S1301 Hezhou City Ring Expressway	贺州绕城高速	Hezhou City Ring	Hezhou Ring			
S1511 Tengcen Expressway						
S1701 Yulin City Ring Expressway	玉林绕城高速	Yulin City Ring	Yulin Ring			
S2201 Guilin City Ring Expressway	桂林绕城高速	Guilin City Ring	Guilin Ring			
S3011 Lipu West Ring Expressway						
S4001 Wuzhou City Ring Expressway	梧州绕城高速	Wuzhou City Ring	Wuzhou Ring			
S4301 Qinzhou City Ring Expressway	欽州绕城高速	Qinzhou City Ring	Qinzhou Ring			
S5921 Pingli Expressway						
S5923 Songtie Expressway						
S6001 Chongzuo City Ring Expressway	崇左绕城高速	Chongzuo City Ring	Chongzuo Ring			
S6011 Yuewei Port Expressway						
S6411 Qinzhou Port Branch						
S6511 Cenluo Expressway						Renumbered to S50
S6901 Baise City Ring Expressway	百色绕城高速	Baise City Ring	Baise City Ring			
S7221 Shawu Expressway						
S7512 Fangchenggang Branch						Became a portion of S63
S8011 Baise Airport Expressway						
S8711 Xingyi Branch						

== Guizhou ==
Number and name	Chinese name	Route	Origin	Terminus	Length	Notes
S01 Guiyang City Ring Expressway		Guiyang City Ring	Guiyang Ring			
S02 Zunyi City Ring Expressway	遵义绕城高速	Zunyi City Ring	Zunyi Ring			
S03 Liupanshui City Ring Expressway	六盘水绕城高速	Liupanshui City Ring	Liupanshui Ring			
S04 Anshun City Ring Expressway	安顺绕城高速	Anshun City Ring	Anshun Ring			
S10 Dexi Expressway						
S15 Songcong Expressway						
S20 Biwei Expressway						
S25 Yanrong Expressway						
S30 Jiangqian Expressway						
S35 Daoma Expressway						
S40 Guiqing Expressway						
S45 Hualuo Expressway	花罗高速	Huaxi - Luodian	Huaxi	Luodian (GX border)		Became a portion of G69
S50 Huixing Expressway						
S55 Zunwang Expressway						
S57 Liuzhi-Anlong Expressway						
S60 Yu'an Expressway	余安高速	Yuqing - Anlong	Yuqing	Anlong		Renumbered to S62
S62 Yu'an Expressway	余安高速	Yuqing - Anlong	Yuqing	Anlong		
S65 Naxing Expressway	纳兴高速	Nayong - Xingyi	Nayong	Xingyi		Redesignated as G7612
S71 Tonghuai Expressway	铜怀高速	Tongren - Huaihua	Tongren	Huaihua (HN border)		
S75 Weixing Expressway		Weining - Xingyi	Weining (YN border)	Xingyi		Became a portion of S77
S77 Shuixing Expressway	水兴高速	Shuicheng - Xingyi	Shuicheng	Xingyi		
S81 Zhangzun Expressway						
S82 Guida Expressway						
S83 Zhaxiu Expressway						
S84 Tianhuang Expressway						
S85 Dugui Expressway	都贵高速	Duyun - Guiyang	Duyun	Guiyang		Became a portion of G76
S86 Hui'an Expressway	惠安高速	Huishui - Anshun	Huishun	Zhenning		Became a portion of G7611
S87 Zhenliu Expressway	镇六高速	Zhenning - Liupanshui	Zhenning	Liupanshui		Became a portion of G7611
S88 Rongma Expressway						
S89 Hua'an Expressway						

- S04 was originally Bijie City Ring Expressway
- S30 was originally Jiangzhi Expressway
- S45 was originally Guiluo Expressway
- S50 was originally Duxing Expressway
- S55 was originally Chiwang Expressway
- S81 was originally Suiyun Expressway
- S82 was originally Qianda Expressway
- S83 was originally Zhaqian Expressway
- S84 was originally Tianweng Expressway
- S85 was originally Duzhi Expressway
- S87 was originally Daliu Expressway

== Hainan ==
Number and name	Chinese name	Route	Origin	Terminus	Length	Notes
S11 Haibai Expressway	海文高速	Haikou-Baisha	Haikou	Baisha	113 km	Haikou-Chengmai-Canzhou under planning, Danzhou-Baisha open to traffic
S15 Hainan Middle Line Expressway	海南中线高速	Haikou–Sanya	Haikou	Sanya		Renumbered to S21, now G9811
S16 Wanyang Expressway	万洋高速	Wanning-Yangpu	Wanning	Danzhou (Yangpu)		Redesignated as G9813
S21 Hainan Middle Line Expressway	海南中线高速	Haikou–Sanya	Haikou	Sanya		Redesignated as G9811 in 2013
S22 Wenlin Expressway	文临高速	Wenhang-Lingao	Wenhang	Lingao	121 km	Concurrent with G360
S26 Shanhai Expressway	山海高速	Wuzhishan–Haitang Bay	Wuzhishan	Haitang Bay (Sanya)	76 km	Concurrent with G9811
S81 Haikou Connecting Line	海口联络线	Haikou Connecting	Haikou	G98	5 km	Former portion of G98
S82 Meilan Airport Connecting Line	美兰机场联络线	Meilan Airport Connecting	Haikou (G98)	Haikou Airport	25 km	Former portion of G98
S86 Zhonghui Expressway	中会高速	Zhongyuan-Huishan	Zhongyuan	Huishan	25 km	
S88 Yangpu Port Expressway	洋浦疏港高速		Xinyang IC	Yangpu	35 km	

== Hebei ==
Hebei Expressway Numbering Plan 2013-2030
Hebei Expressway Network Plan 2016-2030

Number and name	Chinese name	Route	Origin	Terminus	Length	Notes
S004 Tanggang Expressway	唐港高速	Tangshan - Jingtang Port				Renumbered to S64
S009 Xinglin Expressway	邢临高速	Xingtai - Liuqing (SD border)	Xingtai	Liuqing		
S010 Zhangjiakou Section of Zhangshi Expressway		Jimengjie - Baodingjie				Portion of S69
S013 Baocang Expressway	保沧高速	Baoding-Cangzhou	Baoding	Cangzhou		Became a portion of G1812
S030 Hengshui South Ring Expressway	衡水南绕城高速					
S053 Zhangshi Expressway North Exit Spur Line	张石高速北出口支线					
S072 Hengde Expressway	衡德高速	Hengshui - Dezhou	Hengshui	Jingzhou (SD border)		
S103 West Ring Expressway						
S3 Langcang Expressway						Portion of G3
S11 Hebei Coastal Expressway	河北沿海高速公路	Hebei Coastal	Qinhuangdao	Huanghua (SD border)		Portion of G0111
S23 Qian'an Branch Expressway	迁安支线高速					Branch of G0121
S23 Cangzhou Section of Jingha Expressway			G1	Qianxi		
S24 Langzhuo Expressway	黄邢高速	Langfang - Zhuozhou	Langfang	Zhuozhou		Portion of G95
S30 Xingheng Expressway		Xingtai - Hengshui	Xingtai	Hengshui		
S31 Laiqu Expressway	涞曲高速	Laiyuan - Quyang	Laiyuan	Quyang		
S31 Zhangshi Expressway	张石高速	Zhangjiakou - Shijiazhuang	Zhangjiakou	Quyang		Renumbered to S69
S32 Xuanda Expressway	宣大高速	Xuanhua - Datong	Xuanhua	Yangyuan (SX border)		
S50 Chengduo Expressway	承多高速	Chengde - Duolun	Damiao	Weichang (NM border)		
S51 Qiancao Expressway	迁曹高速	Qian'an - Caofeidian	Qian'an	Caofeidian		
S52 Chengqin Expressway	承秦高速	Chengde - Qinhuangdao	Chengde	Qinhuangdao		
S53 Qianxi Branch Line of Jingqin Expressway	京秦高速迁西支线					
S54 Zhangbei-Shangyi Section of Chongshang Expressway						
S57 Tangcao Expressway	唐曹高速	Tangshan - Caofeidian	Tangshan	Caofeidian		
S59 Chengping Expressway	承平高速	Chengde - Pinggu	Yingshouyingzi	Xinglong (BJ border)		Became a portion of G95
S60 Qinbin Expressway Beidaihe Link	秦滨高速北戴河联络线					
S60 Jingqin Expressway	京秦高速	Beijing - Qinhuangdao	Yanjiao (BJ border)	Dongdaihe		Redesignated as G1N in 2013, now G0121
S61 Mizhuo Expressway	密涿高速	Miyun - Zhuozhou	Sanhe (BJ border)	Gu'an		Became a portion of G95
S62 Beidaihe Airport Expressway	北戴河机场高速	Tangshan - Beidaihe Airport	Tangshan	Beidaihe		
S63 Langcang Expressway	廊沧高速	Langfang - Cangzhou	Langfang	Cangzhou		Renumbered to S3
S64 Tanggang Expressway	唐港高速	Tangshan - Jingtang Port				
S65 Zhangzhuo Expressway	张涿高速	Zhangjiakou - Zhuozhou	Zhuolu	Zhuozhou		Became a portion of G95
S66 Tanglai Expressway	唐涞高速	Tangshan - Laiyuan	Tangshan	Laiyuan		Became a portion of S72
S67 Gucheng Connecting Line	故城联络线	Gucheng Connecting				Portion of G0322
S68 Cangfu Expressway	沧阜高速	Cangzhou - Fuping	Cangxian	Fuping (SX border)		Became a portion of G1812
S69 Zhangshi Expressway	张石高速	Zhangjiakou - Shijiazhuang	Zhangjiakou	Quyang		
S70 Shigang Expressway	石黄高速	Shijiazhuang - Huanghua Port	Shijiazhuang	Huanghua Port		Became a portion of S76
S71 Xibaipo Expressway	西柏坡高速	Shijiazhuang (Xibaipo)	Shijiazhuang	Pingshan		Former S071
S72 Tanglang Expressway	唐廊高速	Tangshan - Langfang	Tangshan	Gu'an		
S73 Shizan Expressway	石赞高速	Shijiazhuang - Zanhuang	Shijiazhuang	Zanhuang		
S74 Hengxi Expressway	衡昔高速	Hengshui - Xiyang	Xinji	Zanhuang (SX border)		Renumbered to S80
S75 Taihang Mountain Expressway	太行山高速	Zhangjiakou - Handan	Zhangjiakou (BJ border)	Handan		
S76 Qugang Expressway	曲港高速	Quyang - Huanghua Port	Quyang	Huanghua Port		
S78 Xinglin Expressway	邢临高速	Xingtai - Linqing	Xingtai	Linqing (SD border)		Renumbered to S009
S80 Xingfen Expressway	邢汾高速	Xingtai - Fenyang	Xingtai	Luluo (SX border)		Became a portion of G2516
S81 Chicheng Branch Expressway	赤城支线高速					Branch of S3801
S82 Handa Expressway	邯大高速	Handan - Daming	Handan	Daming (SD border)		Became a portion of G22
S0105 Tangshan City Ring Expressway	唐山绕城高速	Tangshan City Ring	Tangshan Ring			Became a portion of G25
S0111 Tanggang Expressway	唐港高速	Tangshan - Jingtang Port	Jingtang Port	Tangshan	Jingtang Port	Renumbered to S64
S0411 Baocang Expressway		Baoding - Cangzhou				Renumbered to S013
S2201 Handan City Ring Expressway	邯郸绕城高速	Handan City Ring	Handan Ring			
S2502 Chengde City Ring Expressway	承德绕城高速	Chengde City Ring	Chengde Ring			
S2511 Tangcao Expressway	唐曹高速	Tangshan-Caofeidian	Tangshan	Caofeidian		Renumbered to S57
S9902 Xinyuan Expressway	新元高速	Xinle - Yuanshi	Xinle	Yuanshi	84 km	Former portion of G4
S9905 Hengxi Expressway	衡昔高速	Hengshui - Xiyang			122 km	
S9960 Beidaihe Branch Line	北戴河支线	Beidaihe Branch	Qinhuangdao	Beidaihegang	11 km	Portion of S60
S9961 Qingdongling Branch Line	清东陵支线	Qingdongling Branch	Qingdongling	Zunhua		

- S30 was originally Huangxing Expressway (黄邢高速)
- S52 was originally Erqin Expressway (二秦高速)
- S53 was originally Tangqian Expressway (唐迁高速)
- S54 was originally Zhangshang Expressway (张尚高速)
- S55 was originally Kecheng Expressway (克承高速)
- S65 was originally Jingba Expressway (京霸高速)
- S67 was originally Gucheng Liaison Line (故城联络线)
- S69 was originally Zhangxin Expressway (张辛高速) and later Anxin Expressway (安辛高速)
- S74 was originally Jinxu Expressway (津徐高速)
- S9902 was originally Shijiazhuang Liaison Line (石家庄联络线)

== Heilongjiang ==
Heilongjiang Expressway Numbering Plan 2015-2030

- East-west routes have even numbers and north-south routes have odd numbers.

Number and name	Chinese name	Route	Origin	Terminus	Length	Notes
S1 Harbin Airport Expressway	哈尔滨机场高速	Harbin Airport	Harbin	Harbin Airport		Renumbered to S24 in 2015
S12 Yiqi Expressway	伊齐高速	Yichun - Qiqihar	Yichun	Nianzishan		
S13 Tiewu Expressway	铁五高速	Tieli - Wuchang	Tieli	Wuchang (JL border)		Became a portion of G1015 in 2013
S13 Yijia Expressway	嘉伊高速	Yichun - Jiayin	Yichun	Jiayin (Russian border)		Planned
S14 Heijian Expressway	黑建高速	Heixiazidao - Jiansanjiang	Heixiazidao (Russian border)	Jiansanjiang		Redesignated as G1012 in 2013
S14 Shuangrao Expressway	双饶高速	Shuangyashan - Raohe	Shuangyashan	Raohe (Russian border)		Planned
S16 Beiqi Expressway	北齐高速	Bei'an - Qiqihar	Bei'an	Fuyu		Became a portion of S12 in 2015
S16 Yixing Expressway	依兴高速	Yilan - Xingkai Lake	Yilan	Xingkai Lake		
S18 Baoshuang Expressway	宝双高速	Baoqing - Shuangyashan	Baoqing	Shuangyashan		Became a portion of S14 in 2015
S18 Suida Expressway	绥大高速	Suihua - Daqing	Suihua	Daqing		Under construction
S19 Nentai Expressway	嫩泰高速	Nenjiang - Tailai	Nenjiang	Tailai (JL border)		Became a portion of G4512 in 2013
S20 Qiyi Expressway	七依高速	Qitaihe - Yilan	Qitaihe	Yilan		Became a portion of S16 in 2015
S22 Suida Expressway	绥大高速	Suihua - Daqing	Suihua	Daqing		Renumbered to S18 in 2015
S22 Hazhao Expressway	哈肇高速	Harbin - Zhaoyuan	Zhaodong	Zhaoyuan		Under construction
S24 Harbin Airport Expressway	哈尔滨机场高速	Harbin Airport	Harbin	Harbin Airport		

- S12 was originally Qianqi Expressway (前齐高速)

== Henan ==
Henan Expressway Numbering Plan 2015-2030
Henan Expressway Network Plan 2016-2030

Number and name	Chinese name	Route	Origin	Terminus	Length	Notes
S1 Zhengzhou Airport Expressway	郑州机场高速公路	Zhengzhou Airport	Zhengzhou	Xinzheng		
S2 Zhengzhou Southwest City Ring Expressway	郑州西南绕城高速	Zhengzhou Southwest City Ring				Became a portion of G3001 in 2010
S21 Pushang Expressway	濮商高速	Puyang - Shangcheng	Puyang	Shangcheng (HB border)		
S22 Nanlin Expressway	南林高速	Nanle - Linzhou	Nanle (SD border)	Linzhou (SX border)		
S25 Anluo Expressway	安罗高速	Anyang - Luoshan	Neihuang (HE border)	Luoshan (HB border)		Portion of G0424
S26 Taihui Expressway	台辉高速	Taiqian - Huixian	Taiqian (SD border)	Huixian (SX border)		
S28 Changji Expressway	长济高速	Changyuan - Jiyuan	Changyuan (SD border)	Jiyuan (SX border)		Became a portion of G3511
S28 Puwei Expressway	濮卫高速	Puyang - Weihui	Puyang (SD border)	Weihui		
S32 Yongdeng Expressway	永登高速	Yongcheng - Dengfeng	Yongcheng (AH border)	Dengfeng		
S34 Lanyuan Expressway	兰济高速	Lankao - Yuanyang	Lankao	Yuanyang		
S37 Lanxu Expressway	兰许高速	Lankao - Xuchang	Lankao	Xuchang		Former portion of S83
S37 Deshang Expressway	德上高速	Dezhou - Shangqiu	Fanxian (SD border)	Chenzhuang (SD border)		Became a portion of G0321 in 2013
S38 Xinyang Expressway	新阳高速	Xincai - Biyang	Xincai (AH border)	Biyang		
S39 Deshang Expressway	德上高速	Dezhou - Shangqiu	Fanxian (SD border)	Chenzhuang (SD border)		Renumbered to S37 in 2012
S49 Jiaotang Expressway	焦唐高速	Jiaozuo - Tanghe	Jiaozuo	Tanghe (HB border)		
S57 Mianxi Expressway	渑淅高速	Mianchi - Xichuan	Mianchi (SX border)	Xichuan (HB border)		
S59 Sanxi Expressway	三淅高速	Sanmenxia - Xichuan	Lingbao (SX border)	Xichuan		Became a portion of G59
S60 Shangdeng Expressway	商登高速	Shangqiu - Dengfeng	Shangqiu	Dengfeng		
S62 Huainai Expressway	淮邓高速	Huaibin - Neixiang	Huaibin	Neixiang		
S71 Anyang Northwest City Ring Expressway		Anyang Northwest City Ring				
S81 Shangnan Expressway	商南高速	Shangqiu - Nanyang	Yucheng (AH border)	Nanyang		
S82 Zhengmin Expressway	郑民高速	Zhengzhou - Minquan	Zhengzhou	Minquan		
S83 Lannan Expressway	兰南高速	Lankao - Nanyang	Lankao	Nanyang		Lankao-Xuchang renumbered to S37 and Ye County-Nanyang became a portion of G3612 in 2024
S85 Zhengshao Expressway	郑少高速	Zhengzhou - Shaolinsi	Zhengzhou	Shaolinsi		
S86 Lanyuan Expressway	兰济高速	Lankao - Yuanyang	Lankao	Yuanyang		Renumbered to S34 in 2019
S87 Zhengyun Expressway	郑云高速	Zhengzhou - Yuntaishan	Zhengzhou	Yuntaishan (SX border)		
S88 Zhengyao Expressway	郑栾高速	Zhengzhou - Luanchuan	Zhengzhou	Luanchuan		
S89 Jixi Expressway	机西高速	Kaifeng - Xihua	Xinzhang Airport	Xinhua		Became a portion of S25 in 2019
S92 Luolu Expressway	洛灵高速	Luoyang - Lushi	Luoyang	Lushi		Redesignated as G3615 in 2022
S94 Luanlu Expressway	栾卢高速	Luanchuan - Lushi	Luanchuan	Lushi (SN border)		Renumbered to S78 in 2019
S94 Huogu Expressway	霍固高速					
S96 Luoluan Expressway	洛栾高速	Luoyang - Luanchuan	Luoyang	Luanchuan		
S97 Jiqi Expressway	济祁高速	Jining - Qimen	Mangshan (AH border)	Yongcheng (AH border)		Became a portion of G0321 in 2013
S97 Luolu Expressway	洛灵高速	Luoyang - Lushi	Luoyang	Lushi		Former portion of S85; renumbered to S92 in 2019, now G3615
S98 Neideng Expressway	内邓高速	Neixiang - Dengzhou	Neixiang	Dengzhou		
S99 Denglao Expressway	邓老高速	Dengzhou - Laohekou	Dengzhou	Qushou (HB border)		
S8311 Nanyang North City Ring Expressway	南阳北绕城高速公路	Nanyang North City Ring	Nanyang (S83)	Nanyang (G55)		Became a portion of S81 in 2012

- S26 was originally Fanhui Expressway (范辉高速)
- S49 was originally Jiaotong Expressway (焦桐高速) and later Lintong Expressway (林桐高速) and Linru Expressway (林汝高速)
- S57 was originally Mianluan Expressway (渑栾高速)
- S62 was originally Huaixin Expressway (淮信高速) and later Guxin Expressway (固信高速)
- S81 was originally Shangzhou Expressway (商周高速)
- S85 was originally Zhengshaoluo Expressway (郑少洛高速) and later Zhenglu Expressway (郑卢高速)
- S86 was originally Yuanjiao Expressway (原焦高速) and later Lanjiao Expressway (兰焦高速) and Lanyuan Expressway (兰原高速)
- S88 was originally Wuxi Expressway (武西高速) and later Zhengxi Expressway (郑西高速)
- S92 was originally Xinhui Expressway (新辉高速)
- S99 was originally Qukou Expressway (渠口高速) and later Nankou Expressway (南口高速)

== Hubei ==
- Radial routes are numbered in ascending order clockwise beginning from the north, and are numbered 1-20.
- North-south routes are numbered in ascending order from east to west, have odd numbers, the second digit is 1, 3, or 9 and are numbered 29-93.
- East-west routes are numbered in ascending order from north to south, have even numbers, the second digit is 4 or 8 and are numbered 28-88 (except 40).
- Routes 21-27 are connecting or link routes.

Number and name	Chinese name	Route	Origin	Terminus	Length	Notes
S1 Daihuang Expressway					25 km	
S2 Hanxiao Expressway					32 km	
S3 Wuma Expressway					102 km	
S4 Handa Expressway						Renumbered to S6
S5 Wuying Expressway						Became a portion of G4221
S6 Handa Expressway						Under construction
S7 Wu'e Expressway					54 km	
S8 Guanbao Expressway					16 km	
S9 Wuyang Expressway						Became a portion of G7021 in 2022
S11 Qingzheng Expressway					16 km	
S13 Wujian Expressway					35 km	
S15 Hancai Expressway					35 km	
S17 Qiaoxiao Expressway					26 km	Under construction
S18 Wuhan Airport Expressway	机场高速	Wuhan	Tianhe	Wuhan - Wuhan Airport - Tianhe	18 km	
S19 Wuhan Airport 2nd Expressway	机场二高速	Wuhan - Wuhan Airport	Wuhan	Wuhan Airport	16 km	
S21 Xiaochi Connecting Line	小池接线					
S22 Xishui Connecting Line	浠水接线					
S23 Huangshi Connecting Line	黄石接线	Huangmei - Xiaochi	Huangmei	JX border		
S24 Airport North Link	机场北接线					
S25 Xintan Connecting Line	新滩接线					
S27 Ezhou Airport Link	鄂州机场接线					
S28 Baoshen Expressway						
S28 Mazhu Expressway	麻竹高速	Macheng - Zhushan	Macheng	Zhuxi (SX border)		Became a portion of G4213 in 2013
S29 Mayang Expressway						
S29 Huangxiao Expressway	黄小高速	Huangmei - Xiaochi	Huangmei	JX border		Renumbered to S23 in 2014
S31 Huangxian Expressway						
S33 Xiantong Expressway	咸通高速	Xianning - Tongshan	Xianning	JX border	49 km	
S38 Xiaoying Expressway						
S38 Huang'e Expressway	黄鄂高速	Huanggang - Ezhou	Tuangfeng	Ezhou		Became a portion of S33 in 2014
S39 Tongjie Expressway	通界高速	Tongcheng - Jieshang	Tongshang	HN border		Renumbered to G4E in 2013; now a portion of G0422
S40 Wuhan 4th Ring Expressway						
S43 Xiaohong Expressway					177 km	
S48 Zhangtai Expressway					37 km	
S49 Suiyue Expressway	随岳高速		HE border	HN border		Renumbered to a portion of G4W2 in 2013, now a portion of G0421
S53 Zaoshi Expressway						
S53 Shuangyin Expressway						Renumbered to S63 in 2014
S54 Yaxiao Expressway						
S58 Sanxia Expressway						
S61 Shagong Expressway						
S63 Shuangyin Expressway						
S63 Laoshi Expressway						Became a portion of S88 in 2013
S64 Yilai Expressway						
S68 Fanba Expressway						
S69 Dongduo Expressway						
S69 Yunfang Expressway	郧房高速	Yunyang - Fangxian	Yunyang (HE border)	Fengxian		Became a portion of G59 in 2013
S73 Dengbao Expressway						
S73 Enlai Expressway		Enshi - Laifeng	Jianshi (CQ border)	Laifeng (HN border)		Became a portion of G6911 in 2013
S74 Jianjiang Expressway						
S77 Shixi Expressway						
S78 Qijia Expressway						
S78 Qitai Expressway						
S79 Xingchang Expressway						
S79 Xuanqian Expressway	宣黔高速		Xuan'en	CQ border		Renumbered to S89 in 2014; section from Xianfeng to CQ border dropped
S83 Yunwu Expressway	郧巫高速					Planned
S84 Guiting Expressway	桂汀高速	Guihua - Tingsiqiao				
S87 Lixian Expressway	利咸高速	Lichuan - Xianfeng	Lichuan	Xianfeng		
S88 Lisu Expressway	利苏高速		Lichuan	CQ border		Became a portion of G5012 in 2013
S89 Xuanxian Expressway	宣咸高速	Xuan'en - Xianfeng	Xuan'en	Xianfeng		

== Hunan ==
Number and name	Chinese name	Route	Origin	Terminus	Length	Notes
S01 Ningshao Expressway	宁韶高速	Ningxiang - Shaoshan	Ningxiang	Shaoshan		
S05 Huashi Expressway		Huarong - Shishou	Huarong	Shishou (HB border)		Became a portion of S71
S10 Zhanghua Expressway	张花高速	Zhangjiajie - Huayuan	Zhangjiajie	Huayuan		
S11 Pingru Expressway		Pingjiang-Rucheng	Pingjiang	Rucheng		Portion of G0422
S20 Changyong Expressway		Changsha - Yongan	Changsha	Yongan		Became a portion of G6021
S21 Changzhu Expressway	长株高速	Changsha - Zhuzhou	Changsha	Zhuzhou		
S30 Liuhong Expressway	浏洪高速	Liuyang - Hongkoujie	Liuyang	Hongkoujie (JX border)		Renumbered to S19
S31 Yifeng Expressway	宜凤高速	Yizhang - Fengtouling	Yizhang	Fengtouling (GD border)		Portion of G0421
S40 Changsha Airport Expressway	机场高速		Changsha	Changsha Airport		
S41 Changtan West Line	长潭西线高速		Changsha	Xiangtan		
S50 Changlou Expressway		Changsha - Loudi	Changsha	Loudi		
S51 Nanyue Expressway		Hengyang - Nanyue	Hengyang	Nanyue		
S61 Yuelin Expressway		Yueyang - Linwu	Yueyang (HB border)	Linwu (GD border)		Portion of G0421
S70 Louhuai Expressway		Loudi - Huaihua	Loudi	Huaihua		
S71 Yilouheng Expressway		Yiyang - Loudi - Hengyang	Yiyang	Hengyang		
S80 Hengshao Expressway	衡邵高速	Hengyang - Shaoyang	Hengyang	Shaoyang		
S81 Daoyong Expressway		Daoxian - Yongjiting	Daoxian	Yongjiting (Xiangguijie)		
S90 Yanmu Expressway		Yanling - Mucun	Yanling	Mucun		
S91 Dongxin Expressway		Dongkou - Xinning	Dongkou	Xinning		
S93 Wucheng Expressway		Wugang - Chengbu	Wugang	Chengbu (GX border)		Became a portion of S91
S7101 Yiyang City Ring Expressway		Yiyang City Ring				

== Jiangsu ==
Jiangsu Expressway Numbering Plan 2017-2035

Number and name	Chinese name	Route	Origin	Terminus	Length	Notes
S1 Ningyan Expressway	宁盐高速	Nanjing - Yancheng	Luhe	Yancheng		
S2 Ningchang Expressway	宁常高速	Nanjing - Changzhou	Jiangning	Changzhou		
S3 Linyan Expressway	临盐高速	Linyi - Yancheng	Donghai (SD border)	Yancheng		Renumbered to S27 in 2018
S3 Ningguang Expressway	宁广高速	Nanjing - Guangde	Gaochun	Gaochun (AH border)		
S5 Changjia Expressway	常嘉高速	Changshu - Jiashan	Changshu	Kunshan (ZJ border)		Redesignated as G15W2 in 2013, now G1521
S6 Liansu Expressway	连宿高速	Lianyungang - Suqian	Guannan	Suqian		Renumbered to S16 in 2018
S6 Ninghuang Expressway	宁黄高速	Nanjing - Huangshan	Nanjing	Gaochun (AH border)		
S7 Yanning Expressway	盐宁高速	Yancheng - Nanjing	Yancheng	Lukou		Renumbered to S1 in 2018
S7 Ninghe Expressway	宁和高速	Nanjing - Hexian	Nanjing	Pukou (AH border)		
S8 Sisu Expressway	泗宿高速	Siyang - Suzhou	Siyang	Sihong (AH border)		Became a portion of G1516 in 2013
S8 Ningchu Expressway		Nanjing - Chuzhou	Pizhou (SD border)	Pizhou (AH border)		
S9 Sushao Expressway	苏绍高速	Suzhou - Shaoxing	Suzhou	Nanxun (ZJ border)		Became a portion of S17 in 2018
S10 Binhuai Expressway	滨淮高速	Binhai - Huai'an	Binhai	Siyang		Renumbered to S18 in 2018
S10 Peifeng Expressway	沛丰高速	Peixian - Fengxian	Peixian (SD border)	Fengxian (AH border)		
S11 Tonghu Expressway	通沪高速	Tongzhouwan - Shanghai	Qidong	Qidong (SH border)		
S12 Dongxing Expressway	东兴高速	Dongtai - Xinghua	Dongtai	Xinghua		Renumbered to S26 in 2018
S12 Ningxu Expressway	宁徐高速	Nanjing - Xuzhou	Luhe	Xuzhou		
S13 Tongchang Expressway	通常高速	Tongzhouwan - Changshu	Tongzhouwan	Changshu		
S15 Yangtong Expressway	洋通高速	Yanghe - Tongzhouwan	Yanghe	Haimen		Originally numbered as S19; redesignated as G1519 in 2022
S16 Liansu Expressway	连宿高速	Lianyungang - Suqian	Guannan	Suqian		
S17 Sutai Expressway	苏台高速	Suzhou - Taizhou	Suzhou	Nanxun (ZJ border)		
S18 Yanhuai Expressway	盐淮高速	Yancheng - Huai'an	Dafeng	Huai'an		Became a portion of G1516 in 2013
S18 Binhuai Expressway	滨淮高速	Binhai - Huai'an	Binhai	Siyang		
S19 Tongxi Expressway	通锡高速	Tongzhouwan - Wuxi	Rudong	Wuxi		
S20 Sibeng Expressway	泗蚌高速	Sihong - Bengbu	Sihong	Shuanggou (AH border)		
S21 Sheyan Expressway	射盐高速	Sheyang - Yancheng	Sheyang	Yancheng		
S22 Yining Expressway	仪宁高速	Yizheng - Nanjing	Yizheng	Nanjing		Renumbered to S9 in 2018
S22 Yanbeng Expressway	盐蚌高速	Yancheng - Bengbu	Yancheng	Xuyi (AH border)		
S23 Jingzhang Expressway	靖张高速	Jingjiang - Zhangjiagang	Jingjiang	Zhangjiagang		
S26 Dongxing Expressway	东兴高速	Dongtai - Xinghua	Dongtai	Xinghua		
S27 Linyan Expressway	临盐高速	Linyi - Yancheng	Donghai (SD border)	Yancheng		
S28 Qiyang Expressway	启扬高速	Qidong - Yangzhou	Qidong	Yangzhou		
S29 Yanjing Expressway	盐靖高速	Yancheng - Jingjiang	Yancheng	Jingjiang		Redesignated as G1515 in 2013
S30 Ruchang Expressway	如常高速	Rugao - Changzhou	Rugao	Changzhou		
S32 Chonghai Expressway	崇海高速	Chongming - Haimen	Haimen (SH border)	Haimen		
S35 Fuli Expressway	阜溧高速	Funing - Liyang	Funing	Liyang		
S36 Yining Expressway	仪宁高速	Yizheng - Nanjing	Yizheng	Nanjing		
S38 Changhe Expressway	常合高速	Changshu - Hefei	Changshu	Lukou (AH border)		Became a portion of G42S in 2013, now a portion of G4221
S39 Jiangyi Expressway	江宜高速	Jiangdu - Yixing	Jiangdu	Yixing		
S45 Jinhang Expressway	金杭高速	Jintan - Hangzhou	Jintan	Yixing (ZJ border)		
S47 Yilu Expressway	仪禄高速	Yizheng - Lukou	Yizheng	Lukou		
S48 Huyi Expressway	沪宜高速	Shanghai - Yixing	Taicang (SH border)	Yixing		
S49 Xinyang Expressway	新扬高速	Xinyi - Yangzhou	Xinyi	Yangzhou		
S51 Lihuang Expressway	溧黄高速	Liyang - Huangshan	Liyang	Liyang (AH border)		Became a portion of G4012 in 2013
S55 Ningxuan Expressway	宁宣高速	Nanjing - Xuancheng	Nanjing	Gaochun (AH border)		
S58 Huchang Expressway	沪常高速	Shanghai - Changzhou	Kunshan (SH border)	Changzhou		In Shanghai, it is designated S26, and in Jiangsu, it is designated S58.
S59 Ninghe Expressway	宁和高速	Nanjing - Hexian	Nanjing	Pukou (AH border)		Renumbered to S7 in 2018
S61 Taisui Expressway	台睢高速	Tai'erzhuang - Suining	Pizhou (SD border)	Suining		
S63 Xubeng Expressway	徐蚌高速	Xuzhou - Bengbu	Xuzhou	Xuzhou (AH border)		Became a portion of G0323
S65 Xuming Expressway	徐明高速	Xuzhou - Mingguang	Xuzhou	Xuzhou (AH border)		
S67 Xufu Expressway	徐阜高速	Xuzhou - Fuyang	Xuzhou	Xuzhou (AH border)		
S68 Liwu Expressway	溧芜高速	Liyang - Wuhu	Liyang	Gaochun (AH border)		
S69 Jixu Expressway	济徐高速	Jining - Xuzhou	Fengxian (SD border)	Xuzhou		Became a portion of G0323
S72 Lianyunganggang North Port Expressway	连云港港北疏港高速	Lianyunganggang North Port	Lianyungang (G30)	Lianyungang (G25)		
S73 Lianyunganggang East Port Expressway	连云港港东疏港高速	Lianyunganggang East Port	Lianyunganggang	Lianyungang		
S74 Sheyan Expressway	射盐高速	Sheyang - Yancheng	Sheyang	Yancheng		Renumbered to S21 in 2018
S75 Futai Expressway	阜泰高速	Funing - Taizhou	Funing	Taizhou		Became a portion of S35 in 2018
S76 Tongzhouwan Branch Line	通州湾支线	Tongzhouwan Branch	Tongzhouwan	Tongzhou		Became a portion of S13 in 2018
S77 Taichang Expressway	泰常高速	Taizhou - Changzhou	Taizhou	Changzhou		Became a portion of S30 in 2018
S78 Nantong City Ring Expressway	南通绕城高速	Nantong City Ring	Yanghe	Haimen		Became a portion of S32 in 2018
S79 Nantong Branch Line	南通支线	Nantong Branch	Pingchao	Nantong		
S80 Taicanggang North Port Expressway	太仓港北疏港高速	Taicanggang North Port	Taicanggang	Changshu		
S81 Taicanggang South Port Expressway	太仓港南疏港高速	Taicanggang South Port	Taicanggang	Taicang		
S82 Jingzhang Expressway	靖张高速	Jingjiang - Zhangjiagang	Jingjiang	Zhangjiagang		Renumbered to S23 in 2018
S85 Changli Expressway	常溧高速	Changzhou - Liyang	Jintan	Liyang		Became a portion of S35 in 2018
S86 Zhenjiang Branch Line	镇江支线高速公路	Zhenjiang Branch	Zhenjiang	G42		Downgraded to urban expressway in 2017
S87 Nanjing Branch Line	南京支线	Nanjing Branch	Nanjing	Dongshan		
S88 Nanjing Airport Expressway	南京机场高速	Nanjing Airport	Nanjing	Lukou Airport		
S89 Danjin Expressway	丹金高速	Danyang - Jintan	Danyang	Jintan		Became a portion of S35 in 2018
S90 Lulai Expressway	六来高速	Luhe - Lai'an	Luhe	Luhe (AH border)		Became a portion of S8 in 2018
S92 Baojin Expressway	宝金高速	Baoying - Jinhu	Baoying	Xuyi		Became a portion of S22 in 2018
S94 Xuming Expressway	盱明高速	Xuyi - Mingguang	Xuyi	Xuyi (AH border)		Became a portion of S22 in 2018
S95 Siwu Expressway	双五高速	Siwong - Wuhe	Shuanggou	Shuanggou (AH border)		Became a portion of S20 in 2018
S96 Suqian Branch Line	宿迁支线	Suqian Branch	Suqian	Suqian (S49)		
S97 Taisui Expressway	台睢高速	Tai'erzhuang - Suining	Pizhou (SD border)	Suining		Renumbered to S61 in 2018

- S35 was originally Taizhen Expressway (泰镇高速)
- S45 was originally Yihang Expressway (宜杭高速)
- S75 was originally Fuxingtai Branch Line (阜兴泰支线)
- S82 was originally Zhangjiaganggang Port Expressway (张家港港疏港高速)
- S83 was originally Wuxi Branch Line (无锡支线)
- S85 was originally Liyang Branch Line (溧阳支线)
- S92 was originally Jinhu Branch Line (金湖支线)

== Jiangxi ==
Number and name	Chinese name	Route	Origin	Terminus	Length	Notes
S19 Deshang Expressway	德上高速	Dexing - Shangrao				Became a portion of G3W in 2013, now a portion of G0321
S20 Penghu Expressway	彭湖高速	Pengze - Hukou	AH border	Hukou	64 km	
S26 Dewu Expressway	德婺高速	Dexing - Wuyuan	ZH border	AH border		Became a portion of G3W in 2013, now a portion of G0321
S26 Jingdezhen Ring Expressway	景德镇绕城高速	Jingdezhen City Ring	Jingdezhen Ring			Currently unnumbered
S29 Qifu Expressway	祁浮高速	Qimen - Fuliang	AH border	Fuliang		
S30 Yongwu Expressway	永武高速	Yongxiu - Wuning	Yongxiu	HB border		
S32 Xiuping Expressway	修平高速	Xiushui - Pingjiang	Xiushui	HU border		
S36 Dechang Expressway	德昌高速	Dexing - Nanchang	Dexing	Nanchang		Became a portion of G60N in 2013, now G6021
S39 Liulei Expressway	刘雷高速	Liujiadawu - Leijiawan	Liujiadawu	Leijiawan		
S40 Changtong Expressway	昌铜高速	Nanchang - Tonggu	Nanchang	HU border		Became a portion of G60N in 2013, now G6021
S41 Ningding Expressway		Ningdu - Dingnan	Ningdu	Dingnan		
S46 Fuji Expressway	资吉高速	Fuzhou - Ji'an	FJ border	Ji'an		Redesignated as G7012 in 2022
S49 Fengsheng Expressway	枫生高速	Fenglin - Shengmi	Fenglin	Shengmi		
S50 Taijing Expressway	泰井高速	Taihe - Jinggangshan	Taihe	HU border		Became a portion of G1517 in 2013
S55 Ningxing Expressway	宁兴高速公路	Ningdu - Xingguo	Ningdu	Xingguo		
S59 Shenghou Expressway	生厚高速	Shengmi - Houtian	Shengmi	Houtian		Became a portion of G6011 in 2013
S61 Ji'an City Ring Expressway	吉安绕城高速	Ji'an City Ring	Ji'an Ring			
S66 Kangda Expressway	康大高速	Nankang - Dayu	Nankang	GD border		Became a portion of G6011 in 2013
S69 Zhangji Expressway	樟吉高速	Zhangshu - Ji'an	Zhangshu	Ji'an		
S79 Wurui Expressway	武瑞高速	Wuxue - Ruichang	GD border	Ruichang		
S80 Xunxin Expressway	寻信高速	Xunwu - Xinfeng	FJ border	GD border		
S81 Tongyi Expressway	铜宜高速	Tonggu - Yichun	Tonggu	Yichun		
S86 Dingnan Connecting Line	定南联络线高速公路	Dingnan Connecting	S41	G4511		
S89 Shanglian Expressway	上莲高速	Shangli - Lianhua	HN border	Lianhua		
S3501 Jingdezhen City Ring Expressway	寻信高速	Jingdezhen City Ring	Jingdezhen Ring			Renumbered to S26 in 2013
S4502 Ji'an City Ring Expressway	吉安绕城高速	Ji'an City Ring	Ji'an Ring			Renumbered to S61 in 2013
S4503 Ganzhou City Ring Expressway	赣州绕城高速	Ganzhou City Ring	Ganzhou Ring			Became a portion of G6011 in 2013
S5601 Jiujiang City Ring Expressway	九江绕城高速	Jiujiang City Ring	Jiujiang Ring			Renumbered to S37 in 2013

== Jilin ==
Jilin Expressway Numbering Plan 2011-2030
Jilin Expressway Numbering Plan 2014-2030

Number and name	Chinese name	Route	Origin	Terminus	Length	Notes
S1 Fuchang Expressway	抚长高速	Fusong - Changchun	Changbai (North Korean border)	Changchun	320 km	
S2 Changtai Expressway	长太高速	Changchun - Taipingchuan	Changchun	Taipingchuan		Planned
S11 Musan Expressway	牡三高速	Mudanjiang - Sanhe	HJ border	Sanhe (North Korean border)		
S13 Huilin Expressway	辉临高速	Huinan - Linjiang	Huinan	Linjiang (North Korean border)		
S14 Yingdong Expressway	营东高速	Yingcheng - Dongfeng	Yingcheng	Dongfeng	74 km	
S15 Yikai Expressway	伊开高速	Yitong - Kaiyuan	Yitong	Liaoyuan (LN border)		
S16 Tongnan Expressway	通南高速	Tongnan - Nanzamu	Tonghua	Tonghua (LN border)	46 km	Known as S16 in Jilin and S10 in Liaoning
S17 Baitao Expressway	白洮高速				51 km	Former G1204
S20 Wuyou Expressway	五右高速	Wuchang - Keyouzhong	Fuyu (HL border)	Tongfa (NM border)		Became a portion of G1015
S22 Puzuo Expressway	蒲左高速	Dapuchaihe - Kezuozhong	Dapuchaihe	Taipingchuan		Became a portion of S2
S26 Fuchang Expressway	抚长高速	Fusong - Changchun	Changbai (North Korean border)	Changchun		Renumbered to S1
S47 Nendan Expressway	嫩丹高速	Nenjiang - Dandong	Tantu (HL border)	Shuangliao		Became a portion of G4512
S96 Changchun Area Ring Expressway	长春圈环线高速	Changchun Area Ring	Changchun Ring			Redesignated as G9902 in 2022
S0111 Huilin Expressway	辉临高速	Huinan - Linjiang	Huinan	Linjiang (North Korean border)		Renumbered to S13 in 2018
S0112 Yingdong Expressway	营东高速	Yingchengzi - Dongfeng	Yingchengzi	Dongfeng		Renumbered to S14 in 2018
S0113 Yiliao Expressway	伊辽高速	Yitong - Liaoyuan	Yitong	Liaoyuan (LN border)	43 km	Renumbered to S15 in 2018
S1111 Tongnan Expressway	通南高速	Tonghua - Nanzamu	Tonghua	Tonghua (LN border)		Renumbered to S16 in 2018
S1112 Muyan Expressway	牡延高速	Mudanjiang - Yanji	Wangqing (HL border)	Yanji		Became a portion of S11 in 2018
S1116 Wangpu Expressway	汪蒲高速	Wangqing - Dapuchaihe	Wangqing	Dapuchaihe		Became a portion of S1112
S1117 Longsan Expressway	龙三高速	Longjing - Sanhe	Longjing	Sanhe (North Korean border)		Renumbered to S1212
S1118 Songchang Expressway	松长高速	Songjiang - Changbaishan	Songjiang	Changbaishan		Redesignated as G1215
S1201 Jilin City Ring Expressway	吉林绕城高速	Jilin City Ring	Jilin Ring			Redesignated as G1201
S1202 Songyuan City Ring Expressway	松原绕城高速	Songyuan City Ring	Songyuan Ring			Redesignated as G1202
S1204 Baicheng City Ring Expressway	白城绕城高速	Baicheng City Ring	Baicheng Ring			Redesignated as G1204; now S17
S1211 Yanlong Expressway	延龙高速	Yanji - Longjing	Yanji	Longjing		Became a portion of S11 in 2018
S1212 Longsan Expressway	龙三高速	Longjing - Sanhe	Longjing	Sanhe (North Korean border)		Became a portion of S11 in 2018
S2610 Huilin Expressway	辉临高速	Huinan - Linjiang	Huinan	Linjiang (North Korean border)		Redesignated as S0111
S2611 Yingdong Expressway	营东高速	Yingchengzi - Dongfeng	Yingchengzi	Dongfeng		Redesignated as S0112
S2612 Yiliao Expressway	伊辽高速	Yitong - Liaoyuan	Yitong	Liaoyuan (LN border)		Redesignated as S0113

== Liaoning ==
Liaoning Expressway List on Chinese Wiki

Number and name	Chinese name	Route	Origin	Terminus	Length	Notes
S2 Shenkang Expressway	沈康高速	Shenyang - Kangping	Shenyang	Kangping		Redesignated as G2519 in 2022
S3 Shentao Expressway	沈桃高速	Shenyang - Taoxian	Shenyang	Taoxian Airport	12 km	
S10 Futong Expressway	抚通高速	Fushun - Tonghua	Nanzamu	Xinbin (JL border)	97 km	
S12 Pichang Expressway	皮长高速	Pikou - Changxingdao	Pikou	Changxingdao	12 km	
S13 Yonghuan Expressway	永桓高速	Yongling - Huanren	Yongling	Huanren	69 km	
S14 Xikai Expressway	西开高速	Xifeng - Kaiyuan	Xifeng (JL border)	Kaiyuan	87 km	
S17 Pingkang Expressway	平康高速	Siping - Kangping	Changtu	Kangping	84 km	
S18 Huanben Expressway	桓本高速	Huanren - Benxi	Huanren (JL border)	Benxi		Became a portion of G9111 in 2013
S19 Zhuanggai Expressway	庄盖高速	Zhuanghe - Gaizhou	Zhuanghe	Gaizhou	101 km	
S20 Benchao Expressway	本朝高速	Benxi - Chaoyang	Benxi	Beipiao	42 km	
S21 Fuying Expressway	阜营高速	Fuxin - Yingkou	Fuxin (NM border)	Yingkou		Became a portion of G4513
S23 Dayaowan Port Expressway	大窑湾疏港高速	Dayaowan Port	Jinzhou	Pulandian	22 km	
S26 Xingjian Expressway	兴建高速	Xingcheng - Jianchang	Xingcheng	Jianchang (HE border)	84 km	
S27 Suiling Expressway	绥凌高速	Suizhong - Lingyuan	Suizhong	Lingyuan (NM border)		Became a portion of G4515
S29 Liaobingang Port Expressway	辽滨港疏港高速	Liaobingang Port	Gaosheng	Liaobingang	68 km	
S30 Xianrendao Port Expressway	仙人岛疏港高速	Xianrendao Port	Gaizhou	Xianrendaogang	6 km	
S31 Jinzhougang Port Expressway	锦州港疏港高速	Jinzhougang Port	Jinzhou	Jinzhougang		
S32 Xindan Expressway	新丹高速	Xinyizhou - Dandong	Dandong (North Korean border)	Dandong		
S33 Dadonggang Port Expressway	大东港疏港高速	Dadonggang Port	Donggang	Dadonggang	18 km	Under construction
S34 Huawa Expressway	花瓦高速	Huayuankou - Wafangdian	Huayuankou	Wafangdian		
S35 Haiyanghong Port Expressway	海洋红疏港高速	Haiyanghong Port	Gushan	Haiyanghonggang	14 km	
S37 Dalianwan Port Expressway	大连湾疏港高速	Dalianwan Port	Jinzhou	Dalianwangang		
S39 Changxingdao North Port Expressway	长兴岛北疏港高速	Changxingdao North Port	Wafangdian	Changxingdaogang	44 km	

- S20 was originally Dengliao Expressway (灯辽高速)

== Ningxia ==
Ningxia Expressway Numbering Plan 2015-2030

- All numbers are two digits. North-south routes end in 0 and east-west routes end in 5.

Number and name	Chinese name	Route	Origin	Terminus	Length	Notes
S1 Yinshi Expressway	银石高速	Yinchuan - Shizuishan	Yinchuan	Huinong (NM border)		Became a portion of G1816
S3 Yinxi Expressway	银西高速	Yinchuan - Xi'an	Yinchuan	Tianshuibao (GS border)		Became a portion of G85
S4 Yinzhong Expressway	银中高速	Yinchuan - Zhongwei	Yinchuan	Zhongwei		Became a portion of G1816
S5 Yinba Expressway	银巴高速	Yinchuan - Barunbieli	Yinchuan	Touguan (NM border)		Became a portion of G1817
S10 Shiping Expressway	石平高速	Shizuishan - Pingluo	Shizuishan	Pingluo		
S11 Yan'e Expressway	盐鄂高速	Yanchi - Eqian	Yanchi	Yanchi (NM border)		Renumbered to S15
S12 Guqing Expressway	古青高速	Guyaozi - Qingtongxia	Guyaozi (NM border)	Qingtongxia		Renumbered to S30
S15 Yan'e Expressway	盐鄂高速	Yanchi - Eqian	Yanchi	Yanchi (NM border)		
S19 Gunhong Expressway	滚红高速	Gunquan - Hongsibu	Gunquan	Hongsibu		Became a portion of G6
S20 Wulingqing North Ring Expressway	吴灵青北环高速	Wuzhong - Lingwu - Qingtongxia North Ring	Wuzhong	Qingtongxia		Planned
S25 Jinghua Expressway	泾华高速	Jingyuan - Huating	Jingyuan	Jingyuan (GS border)		
S27 Shizhong Expressway	石中高速	Shizuishan - Zhongwei	Huinong (NM border)	Zhongwei		Became a portion of G1816
S30 Guqing Expressway	古青高速	Guyaozi - Qingtongxia	Guyaozi (NM border)	Qingtongxia		
S35 Shi'en Expressway	石恩高速	Shikong - Enhe	Shikong	Enhe		Planned
S40 Menghai Expressway	萌海高速	Mengcheng - Haiyuan	Mengcheng	Haiyuan		Under construction
S45 Zhonghai Expressway	中海高速	Zhongwei - Haiyuan	Zhongwei	Haiyuan		
S50 Zhaihai Expressway	寨海高速	Zhaike - Haiyuan	Zhaike	Haiyuan (GS border)		Heicheng–Haiyan section complete; Zhaike–Heicheng and Haiyuan–Pingchuan sections in planning stages
S60 Guxi Expressway	固西高速	Guyuan - Xiji	Guyuan	Xiji (GS border)		
S70 Gupeng Expressway	固彭高速	Guyuan - Pengyang	Guyuan	Pengyang (GS border)		

== Qinghai ==
Number and name	Chinese name	Route	Origin	Terminus	Length	Notes
S11 Zhanghe Expressway	张河高速		Menyuan (GS border)	Tongren (GS border)		Became a portion of G0611
S13 Gongchang Expressway	共昌高速		Gonghe	Tibetian border		Became a portion of G0613
S20 Wumang Expressway						
S22 Lingong Expressway						
S24 Changxiang Expressway			SC border	Xiangride		Became a portion of G0615
S26 Gemang Expressway						
S1111 Dahu Expressway						
S1112 Ninghu Expressway						
S1113 Ninggui Expressway						
S1114 Tongxia Expressway						
S1115 Heda Expressway						Became a portion of G1816
S2011 Huangxi Expressway		Huangyuan - Xihai				Became a portion of G0612
S2012 Tiancha Expressway						
S2013 Decha Expressway		Delingha - Chahannuo				
S2014 Dedu Expressway		Delingha - Dulan				Became a portion of G0615
S2411 Jiuma Expressway			Jiuzhi	Jiuzhi (GS border)		
Gongyu Expressway						

== Shaanxi ==
Number and name	Chinese name	Route	Origin	Terminus	Length	Notes
S1 Airport Expressway	机场 高速	Xi'an - Xianyang Airport - Xianyang				
S02 Xi'an Outer Ring Expressway	西安外环高速	Xi'an Outer Ring				
S03 Xi'an Great Ring Expressway	西安大环高速	Xi'an Great Ring				
S10 Fushen Expressway	府神高速	Fugu - Shenmu	Fugu	Erlintu		
S11 Shenmi Expressway	神米高速	Shenmu - Mizhi				
S12 Jiayu Expressway	佳榆高速	Jiaxian - Yulin				
S13 Chengshang Expressway	神米高速	Chengcheng - Shangluo				
S14 Qing'an Expressway	清安高速	Qingjian - Ansai				
S15 Ziyan Expressway		Zicheng - Yan'an				
S16 Yanwu Expressway	延吴高速	Yan'an - Wuqi	Yan'an	Wuqi		
S17 Tongxun Expressway	桐旬高速	Tongmu - Xunyang				
S18 Hanhuang Expressway	韩黄高速	Hancheng - Huangling				
S19 Fuyin Lianhuo Connecting Line	福银连霍联络线	Fuyin Lianhuo Connecting	G69/G70	Xingping		
S20 Dafeng Expressway	大凤高速	Dali - Fengxiang				
S21 Ningshi Expressway	宁石高速	Ningshan - Shiquan				
S22 Qianqi Expressway	乾岐高速	Qianxian - Qishan				
S23 Dingwu Expressway	定吴高速	Dingbian - Wuqi	Dingbian	Huachi (GS border)		
S24 Zhoufeng Expressway	周凤高速	Zhouzhi - Qishan				
S25 Linjiang Expressway	麟绛高速	Linyou - Jiangzhang				
S26 Luolu Expressway	洛卢高速	Luonan - Lushi	Luonan	Lushi (HA border)		
S27 Yangzhen Expressway		Yangxian - Zhenba	Yangxian	Bashan (SC border)		
S28 Meifeng Expressway		Meixian - Fengxian	Meixian	Fengxian (GS border)		
S29 Chahu Expressway		Chadian - Huajiaba				
S3011 Xi'an Ring Expressway						
S4011 Shangzhou Connecting Line						
S4012 Lantian Connecting Line						
S6511 Pengzhen Connecting Line						
S6512 Banjiegou Connecting Line						

== Shandong ==
Shandong Expressway Numbering Plan 2009-2030
Shandong Expressway Network Plan 2015-2030

Number and name	Chinese name	Route	Origin	Terminus	Length	Notes
S1 Jiliao Expressway	济聊高速	Jinan - Liaocheng	Dongchangfu	Guanxian (HE border)	64 km	Jinan-Liaocheng section became G0311 in 2022
S7 Jitai Expressway		Jinan - Taian	Jinan	Taian		
S11 Yanhai Expressway	烟海高速	Yantai - Haiyang	Yantai	Haiyang	120 km	
S12 Binde Expressway	滨德高速	Binzhou - Dezhou	Wudi	Dezhou (HE border)		Redesignated as G1818 in 2022
S14 Bingaoxing Expressway	滨高邢高速	Binzhou - Gaotang - Xingtai	Gaoting	Xingtai		
S16 Rongwei Expressway	荣潍高速	Rongcheng - Weifang	Wendeng	Weifang	368 km	
S17 Pengqi Expressway	蓬栖高速	Penglai - Qixia	Penglai	Qixia		
S19 Longqing Expressway	龙青高速	Longkou - Qingdao	Longkougang	Qingdao		
S21 Xindong Expressway	新董高速	Xinhe - Dongjiangkou	Xinhe	Dongjiangkou	88 km	
S23 Weiri Expressway	潍日高速	Weifang - Rizhao	Weifanggang	Rizhao		Redesignated as G1815
S24 Weiqing Expressway	威青高速	Weihai - Qingdao	Weihai	Jiaozhou		Redesignated as G1813
S26 Laitai Expressway	莱泰高速	Laiwu - Tai'an	Laiwu	Tai'an	55 km	
S27 Huanglin Expressway	黄沂高速	Huanghua - Yishui	Zhanhua	Linshu (JS border)		Became a portion of G0111
S28 Yang'an Expressway	阳安高速	Yanggu - Anyang	Yanggu	Shenxian (HA border)	22 km	
S29 Bintai Expressway	滨台高速	Binzhou - Tai'erzhuang	Binzhou	Tai'erzhuang (JS border)	243 km	
S30 Dongliang Expressway	董梁高速	Dongjiangkou - Liangshan	Dongjiangkougang	Liangshan (HA border)		
S31 Zaoxin Expressway	枣新高速	Zaozhuang - Xintai	Yicheng	Xintai		
S32 Hedong Expressway	菏东高速	Heze - Dongming	Heze	Dongming (HA border)		Became a portion of G3511
S33 Jixu Expressway	济徐高速	Jining - Xuzhou	Dongping	Yutai (JS border)		
S37 Deqi Expressway	德祁高速	Dezhou - Qimen	Dezhou	Yuncheng		Became a portion of G0321
S38 Lancao Expressway	岚曹高速	Lanshan - Caoxian	Lanshangang	Heze		
S39 Deshang Expressway	德商高速	Dezhou - Shangqiu	Wucheng (HE border)	Heze		
S61 Liuting Airport Expressway	青岛流亭机场高速公路	Liuting Airport	Qingdao	Liuting	11 km	
S62 Jiaozhou Airport Expressway	青岛胶州机场高速公路	Jiaozhou Airport	Jiaozhou	Jiaozhou (G20)		
S83 Zaozhuang Connecting Line	枣庄连接线	Zaozhuang Connecting	Tengzhou	Zaozhuang		Became a portion of S38
S84 Dezhou Connecting Line	德州连接线	Dezhou Connecting	Dezhou	Wucheng		Became a portion of G0321
S85 Jiaozhou Bay Bridge	青岛胶州湾大桥	Jiaozhou Bay Bridge	Qingdao	Huangdao		
S90 Rizhao Airport Expressway		Rizhao Airport	Rizhao South	Rizhao Airport		
S7201 Dongying Port Expressway	东营港疏港高速公路	Dongying Port	Kenli	Dongying Port	104 km	
S7601 Qianwan Port Area 1st Expressway	青岛前湾港区第1号疏港高速公路	Qianwan Port Area 1st	Jiaozhouwan	Qianwan	6 km	
S7602 Qianwan Port Area 2nd Expressway	青岛前湾港区第2号疏港高速公路	Qianwan Port Area 2nd	Qianwan	Huangdao (G15)	26 km	
S7603 Qianwan Port Area 3rd Expressway	青岛前湾港区第3号疏港高速公路	Qianwan Port Area 3rd	Qianwan	Qianwan (G22)	33 km	
S7801 Shijiu Port Area Expressway	日照石臼港区疏港高速公路	Shijiu Port Area	Shijiugang	Rizhao Airport		
S8105 Jinan Connecting Line		Jinan Connecting				

- S14 was originally Gaoxing Expressway (高邢高速)
- S21 was originally Xinwei Expressway (新潍高速)
- S27 was originally Huangzhan Expressway (黄沾高速)
- S29 was originally Binlai Expressway (滨莱高速)
- S31 was originally Taixin Expressway (泰新高速)
- S37 was originally Jiqi Expressway (济祁高速)

== Shanghai ==
Shanghai Expressway Numbering Plan 2009-2030

== Shanxi ==
Shanxi Expressway Numbering Plan 2009-2030
Shanxi Expressway Network Plan 2012-2030

Number and name	Chinese name	Route	Origin	Terminus	Length	Notes
S30 Sunyou Expressway	孙右高速	Sunqizhuang - Youyu	Sunqizhuang (HE border)	Youyu	200 km	
S35 Lingfu Expressway	灵阜高速	Lingqiu - Fuping	Lingqiu	Lingqiu (HE border)		
S36 Guanghun Expressway	广浑高速	Guangling - Hunyuan	Guangling (HE border)	Hunyuan	77 km	
S38 Shanshuo Expressway	山朔高速	Shanyin - Shuozhou	Shanyin	Shuozhou		
S40 Linghe Expressway	灵河高速	Lingqiu - Hequ	Lingqiu	Hequ (NM border)	159 km	
S42 Mengyang Expressway	盂阳高速	Yuxian - Yangqu	Yuxian	Yangqu	112 km	
S45 Tianli Expressway	天黎高速	Tianzhen - Licheng	Tianzhen	Licheng	332 km	
S46 Wubao Expressway	五保高速	Wutai - Baode	Wutai (HE border)	Baode (SN border)		Became a portion of G1812 in 2013
S50 Tailin Expressway	太临高速	Taiyuan - Linxian	Taiyuan	Linxian (SN border)	215 km	
S56 Taigu Expressway	太古高速	Taiyuan - Gujiao	Taiyuan	Gujiao	21 km	
S60 Xiqi Expressway	昔碛高速	Xiyang - Qikou	Xiyang (HE border)	Qikou	257 km	
S66 Hefen Expressway	和汾高速	Heshun - Fenyang	Heshun (HE border)	Fenyang		Became a portion of G2516 in 2013
S67 Shupian Expressway	水偏高速	Shuiquan - Pianguan	Shuiquan	Pianguan		
S70 Hongda Expressway	洪大高速	Hongdong - Daning	Hongdong	Daning	111 km	
S70 Liyong Expressway	黎永高速	Licheng - Yonghe	Licheng	Yonghe (SN border)		Became a portion of G2211 in 2013
S73 Mingpu Expressway	明曲高速	Mingjiang - Quting	Mingjiang	Quting		Renumbered to S2211 in 2019
S75 Houping Expressway	侯平高速	Houma - Pinglu	Houma	Pinglu (HA border)	142 km	
S80 Linghou Expressway	陵侯高速	Lingchuan - Houma	Lingchuan (HA border)	Houma	130 km	
S81 Linquin Expressway	临沁高速	Linfen - Qinshui	Linfen	Qinshui	76 km	
S82 Linwu Expressway	临吴高速	Linjin - Wuwangdu	Linjin	Wuwangdu	20 km	
S85 Huagu Expressway	华古高速	Huafeng - Gucheng	Huafeng	Yuanqu	18 km	
S85 Yourui Expressway	右芮高速	Youyu - Ruicheng		Ruicheng (HA border)		Became a portion of G59 in 2013
S87 Yongrui Expressway	永芮高速	Yongji - Ruicheng	Yongji	Ruicheng	41 km	
S88 Yuansun Expressway	垣孙高速	Yuanqu - Sunji	Yuanqu (HA border)	Sunji (SN border)		Became a portion of G3511 in 2013
S0511 Mingqu Expressway	明曲高速	Mingjiang - Quting	Mingjiang	Quting		Renumbered to S73 in 2013; now S2211
S1801 Shuozhou City Ring Expressway	朔州绕城高速	Shuozhou City Ring	Shuozhou Ring			Renumbered to S5901 in 2019
S2001 Yangquan City Ring Expressway	太原二绕高速	Yangquan City Ring	Yangquan Ring			Former S2003 and G2002
S2002 Lüliang City Ring Expressway	阳泉绕城高速	Lüliang City Ring	Lüliang Ring		38 km	
S2011 Shoutai Expressway	寿太高速	Shouyang - Taiyuan	Shouyang	Taiyuan	34 km	
S2012 Longwu Expressway	龙武高速	Longbai – Wuxu	Longbai	Wuxu	34 km	
S2013 Luoxia Expressway	罗夏高速	Luocheng – Xiajiaying	Luocheng	Xiajiaying	34 km	
S2201 Changzhi City Ring Expressway	长治绕城高速	Changzhi City Ring	Changzhi Ring		58 km	Former G2201
S2202 Linfen City Ring Expressway	临汾绕城高速	Linfen City Ring	Linfen Ring		19 km	Former G0501
S2211 Linfen Connecting Line	临汾联络线	Linfen Connecting	Mingjiang	Quting		
S5501 Datong City Ring Expressway	大同绕城高速	Datong City Ring	Datong Ring		31 km	
S5502 Xinzhou City Ring Expressway	忻州绕城高速	Xinzhou City Ring	Xinzhou Ring		32 km	
S5503 Jincheng City Ring Expressway	晋城绕城高速	Jincheng City Ring	Jincheng Ring		31 km	
S5511 Tianxi Expressway	田西高速	Tiancun - Xihe	Tiancun	Xihe	2 km	
S5512 Shanshuo Expressway	山朔高速	Shanyin - Shuozhou	Shanyin	Shuozhou		
S5513 Lingyang Expressway	凌阳高速	Lingjingdian – Yangqu	Lingjingdian	Yangqu		
S5901 Shuozhou City Ring Expressway	朔州绕城高速	Shuozhou City Ring	Shuozhou Ring		64 km	
S5902 Yuncheng City Ring Expressway	运城绕城高速	Yuncheng City Ring	Yuncheng Ring		42 km	
S5911 Xiayun Expressway	夏运高速	Xiaxian - Yuncheng	Xiaxian	Yuncheng	64 km	
S5912 Yunyong Expressway	运永高速	Yuncheng - Yongji	Yuncheng	Yongji	64 km	
S6511 Runxi Expressway	润西高速	Runcheng - Xihe	Runcheng	Xihe	64 km	
S7501 Yuncheng City Ring Expressway	运城绕城高速	Yuncheng City Ring	Yuncheng Ring			Renumbered to S5902 in 2019

- S50 was originally Pinglin Expressway (平临高速)
- S60 was originally Yuqi Expressway (榆祁高速) and later Xili Expressway (昔离高速)
- S86 was originally Jinyang Expressway (晋阳高速)

== Sichuan ==
Sichuan Expressway Numbering Plan 2017-2030

- Radial routes are single digit, numbered in ascending order clockwise beginning north.
- North-south routes are two-digit with odd numbers, numbered in ascending order from east to west.
- East-west routes are two digits with even numbers, numbered in ascending order from north to south.
- Ring roads have a letter identifying the city the route is located and a number identifying the sequence of routes from inside to outside. If there is only one ring road, the number is omitted.

Number and Name	Chinese name	Route	Origin	Terminus	Length	Notes
S1 Chengwan Expressway	成万高速	Chengdu - Wanyuan	Chengdu	Wanyuan	457 km	
S2 Chengba Expressway	成巴高速	Chengdu - Bazhong	Chengdu	Bazhong		Redesignated as G8516 in 2022
S3 Cheng'anyu Expressway	成安渝高速	Chengdu - Anyue - Chongqing	Chengdu	Anyue (CQ border)		Redesignated as G5013
S3 Chengziyu Expressway	成资渝高速	Chengdu - Ziyang - Chongqing	Chengdu	Anyue (CQ border)	164 km	
S4 Chengzilu Expressway	成自泸高速	Chengdu - Zigong - Luzhou	Chengdu	Luzhou (GZ border)		Became a portion of G4215
S4 Chengyigui Expressway	成宜昭高速	Chengdu - Yibin - Guiyang	Chengdu	Junlian (YN border)		Became a portion of G7512
S6 Cheng'e Expressway	成峨高速	Chengdu - Emeishan	Chengdu	Emeishan	12 km	
S7 Chengle Expressway	成乐高速	Chengdu - Leshan	Chengdu	Leshan		Redesignated as G0512 in 2013
S7 Chenghui Expressway	成会高速	Chengdu - Huili	Chengdu	Huili		
S8 Chengming Expressway	成名高速	Chengdu - Mingshan	Chengdu	Mingshan	118 km	
S9 Chengma Expressway	成都马高速	Chengdu - Markang	Chengdu	Markang		Became a portion of G4217
S9 Chengwen Expressway	成汶高速	Chengdu - Wenchuan	Chengdu	Wenchuan		
S10 Jiuzhou Expressway	两郎高速	Jiuzhaigou - Zhouqu	Jiuzhaigou	Zhouqi (GS border)		
S11 Suinei Expressway	遂内高速	Suining - Neijiang	Suining	Neijiang		Became a portion of S41
S11 Kailiang Expressway	开梁高速	Kaijiang - Liangping	Kaijiang	Liangping (Chongqing)		
S12 Tongkai Expressway	通开高速	Tongjiang - Kaizhou	Tongjiang	Kaizhou (Chongqing)		
S13 Chenglin Expressway	城邻高速	Chengkou - Linshui	Chengkou	Linshui		
S14 Jiuma Expressway	九马高速	Jiuzhaigou - Malkang	Jiuzhaigou	Malkang	270 km	
S15 Tongguang Expressway	通广高速	Tongjiang - Guang'an	Tongjiang (SN border)	Huaying (CQ border)	306 km	
S17 Suixi Expressway	遂西高速	Suining - Xichong	Suining	Xichong		Renumbered to S29
S17 Nansan Expressway	南三高速	Nanjiang - Santai	Nanjiang	Santai		
S18 Kaisong Expressway	开松高速	Kaizhou - Songpan	Chongqing (Kaizhou)	Songpan		
S19 Qingyue Expressway	青岳高速	Qingchuan - Yuechi	Qingchuan	Yuechi		
S20 Neiweirong Expressway		Neijiang - Weiyuan - Rongxian				Renumbered to S56
S21 Wutong Expressway	武潼高速	Wusheng - Heschuan	Wusheng	Chongqing (Heschuan)		
S22 Longhan Expressway	隆汉高速	Longchang - Hanyuan				Renumbered to S66
S22 Pingyi Expressway	平仪高速	Pingchang - Yilong	Pingchang	Yilong		
S23 Yinan Expressway	仪南高速	Yilong - Nanchong	Yilong	Nanchong		
S25 Nantong Expressway	南潼高速	Nanchong - Tongnan	Nanchong	Nanchong (CQ border)	60 km	
S26 Wanmian Expressway	万绵高速	Wanzhou - Mianyang	Chongqing (Wanzhou)	Mianyang		
S27 Anronghe Expressway	安荣合高速	Anyue-Rongchang-Hejiang	Anyue	Hejiang		
S28 Nandaliang Expressway	南大梁高速	Nanchong - Dazhu - Liangping	Nanchong	Dazhu (CQ border)		Became a portion of G5515
S28 Suihei Expressway	遂黑高速	Suining - Heishui	Suining	Heishui		
S29 Suixi Expressway	遂西高速	Suining - Xichong	Suining	Xichong	66 km	
S32 Ximian Expressway	西绵高速	Xichong - Mianyang	Nanchong	Mianyang	125 km	
S33 Ronglu Expressway	荣泸高速	Rongchang - Luzhou	Luzhou (CQ border)	Luzhou		Became a portion of G8515
S33 Luyong Expressway	泸永高速	Luzhou - Yongchuan	Luzhou	Luxian (CQ border)	60 km	
S34 Xishe Expressway	西射高速	Xichong - Shehong	Xichong	Shehong		
S35 Datong Expressway	大潼高速	Daying - Tongnan	Daying	Chongqing (Tongnan)		
S37 Xuwei Expressway	叙威高速	Xuyong - Weixin	Xuyong	Xuyong (YN border)	36 km	
S38 Dabao Expressway	大宝高速	Dayi - Baoxing	Dayi	Baoxing		
S39 Lugu Expressway	泸古高速	Luzhou - Gulin	Luzhou	Gulin		
S40 Guanghong Expressway	广洪高速	Guang'an - Hongya	Guang'an	Hongya	307 km	
S41 Suiyibi Expressway	遂宜毕高速	Suining - Yibin - Bijie	Suining	Gongxian (YN border)	330 km	
S43 Yiyi Expressway	宜彝高速	Yibin - Yiliang	Yibin	Yiliang (YN border)		
S44 Le'e Expressway		Leshan - Emei	Leshan	Emei		Became a portion of S66
S44 Wutongan Expressway	武潼安高速	Wusheng - Tongnan - Anju	Wusheng	Anju		
S45 Maoqian Expressway	茂犍高速	Maoxian - Qianwei	Maoxian	Qianwei		
S46 Dianlinhe Expressway	垫邻合高速	Dianlinhe - Linshui - Hechuan	Dianjiang (Chongqing)	Hechuan (Chongqing)		
S48 Tongying Expressway	铜荥高速	Tongliang - Yingjing	Chongqing (Tongliang)	Yingjing		
S49 Guangmiancheng Expressway	广绵成高速	Guangyuan - Mianyang - Chengdu	Guangyuan	Chengdu	46 km	
S51 Bei'an Expressway	北安高速	Beichuan - Anzhou	Beichuan	Anzhou		
S53 Xinde Expressway	新德高速	Xindu - Deyang	Xindu	Deyang		
S55 Ruodiejiu Expressway	若迭九高速	Ruoergai - Diebu - Jiuzhaigou	Ruoergai	Jiuzhaigou		
S56 Rongda Expressway	荣大高速	Rongxian - Dazu	Rongxian	Dazu		
S57 Chengdu North Exit Expressway	城北出口高速	Chengdu North Exit	Chengdu (G5)	Chengdu	10 km	
S59 Chengnan-Chengdu Connecting Line	成南成巴连接线高速	Chengnan-Chengdu Connecting	Chengdu (G5)	Chengdu	10 km	
S60 Ziyong Expressway	自永高速	Zigong - Yongchuan	Zigong	Yongchuan (Chongqing)		
S61 Leshan Airport Expressway	乐山机场高速		Wutong	Leshan Airport		
S62 Yiyu North Line Expressway	宜渝北线高速	Yibin - Jiangjin	Yibin	Jiangjin (Chongqing)		
S63 Pujing Expressway	蒲井高速	Pujiang - Jingyan	Xinjin	Rongxian	86 km	
S66 Longhan Expressway	隆汉高速	Longchang - Hanyuan	Longchang	Hanyuan	303 km	
S67 Xinqiongying Expressway	新邛荥高速	Xinjin - Qionglai - Yingjing	Xinjin	Yingjing		
S69 Hongya Branch Expressway	洪雅支线高速	Hongya Branch	Hongya	Hongya (Qiliping)		
S71 Lekun Expressway	乐昆高速	Leshan - Kunming	Jinkouhe	Huidong (YN border)	340 km	
S73 Lulei Expressway	泸雷高速	Luding - Leibo	Luding	Leibo	270 km	
S74 Yiping Expressway	宜屏高速	Yibin - Pingshan	Yibin	Pingshan		
S76 Muma Expressway	沐马高速	Muchuan - Mabian	Muchuan	Mabian	44 km	
S77 Xiqiao Expressway	西巧高速	Xichang - Qiaojia	Xichang	Ningnan (YN border)	137 km	
S78 Gongsui'e Expressway	珙绥峨高速	Gongxian - Suijiang - Ebian	Gongxian	Ebian		
S79 Maya Expressway	马雅高速	Malkang - Ya'an	Malkang	Ya'an	195 km	
S80 Guxi Expressway	古习高速	Gulin - Xishui	Gulin	Xishui (Guizhou)		
S81 Dehui Expressway	德会高速	Dechang - Huili	Dechang	Huili	60 km	
S83 Liangkang Expressway	马石高速	Malkang - Kangding	Malkang	Kangding		
S84 Yuxuyun Expressway	石甘高速	Chongqing - Xuyong - Junlian	Chongqing (Jiangjin)	Yanjin (YN border)		
S86 Yongshan Branch Expressway	永善支线	Yongshan Branch	Leibo	Yongshan (YN border)		
S87 Sepan Expressway	色攀高速	Seda - Panzhihua	Qinghai	Panzhihua		
S88 Guren Expressway	古仁高速	Gulin - Renhuai	Gulin	Renhuai (GZ border)		
S89 Yanhui Expressway	盐会高速	Yanyuan - Huili	Yanyuan	Huili		
S91 Kanglu Expressway	康炉高速	Kangding - Luhuo	Kangding	Luhuo	152 km	
S94 Huihui Expressway	两会高速		Huidong	Huize (YN border)		
S95 Shidao Expressway	攀大高速	Shiqu - Daocheng	Qinghai	Daocheng		
S96 Panda Expressway	攀大高速	Panzhihua - Dali	Panzhihua	Yongren (YN border)	40 km	
S98 Panzhizua Airport Expressway	攀枝花机场高速		Panzhihua	Panzhizua New Airport		
S99 Debai Expressway	德白高速	Dege - Baiyu	Dege	Baiyu		
SA2 Chengdu 2nd Ring Expressway	成都二绕高速	Chengdu 2nd City Ring	Chengdu 2nd Ring		223 km	Former "G4202"
SA3 Chengdu 3rd Ring Expressway	成都三绕高速	Chengdu 3rd City Ring	Chengdu Ring		331 km	Former "G4203", redesignated as G9910 in 2022
SC Zigong Ring Expressway	自贡绕城高速	Zigong City Ring	Zigong Ring		20 km	
SD Panzhizua City Ring Expressway	攀枝花绕城高速	Panzhizua City Ring	Panzhizua Ring			
SF Deyang City Ring Expressway	德阳绕城高速	Deyang City Ring	Deyang Ring			
SH Guangyuan City Ring Expressway	广元绕城高速	Guangyuan City Ring	Guangyuan Ring		19 km	
SK Neijiang City Ring Expressway	内江绕城高速	Neijiang City Ring	Neijiang Ring		64 km	
SL Leshan City Ring Expressway	乐山绕城高速	Leshan City Ring	Leshan Ring		24 km	
SQ Yibin City Ring Expressway	宜宾绕城高速	Yibin City Ring	Yibin Ring			
SR Nanchong City Ring Expressway	南充绕城高速	Nanchong City Ring	Nanchong Ring		43 km	
SS Dazhou City Ring Expressway	达州绕城高速	Dazhou City Ring	Dazhou Ring		48 km	
SW Xichang City Ring Expressway	西昌绕城高速	Xichang City Ring	Xichang Ring		48 km	
SX Guang'an City Ring Expressway	广安绕城高速	Guang'an City Ring	Guang'an Ring		21 km	

- S2 was originally Chengbashaan Expressway (成巴陕高速)
- S8 was originally Chengqiongkang Expressway (成邛康高速)
- S41 was originally Neiyibi Expressway (内宜毕高速)
- S49 was originally Mianzhong Expressway (绵中高速)
- S53 was originally Maosui Expressway (茂遂高速)
- S63 was originally Puyizhao Expressway (蒲宜昭高速)
- S66 was originally Longle Expressway (隆乐高速)
- S67 was originally Lexi Expressway (乐西高速) and later Lepu Expressway (乐普高速)

== Tianjin ==
Number and name	Chinese name	Route	Origin	Terminus	Length	Notes
S1 Jinji Expressway	津蓟高速公路	Tianjin - Jizhou			118 km	Portion of S3201
S2 Jinning Expressway	津宁高速	Tianjin - Ninghe			48 km	
S3 Jinbin Expressway	津滨高速公路	Tianjin - Binhai			28 km	
S4 Jingang Expressway	津港高速	Xiqing - Binhai			25 km	
S5 Rongwu Connecting Line	荣乌联络线	Tianjin - Shantou			7.1 km	Former portion of G25
S6 Jincang Expressway	津沧高速	Xiqing - Cangzhou			54 km	Also known as S3305
S7 Jinxiong Expressway	保津高速公路	Baoding - Tianjin			19 km	Portion of G18
S8						Reserved
S10 Jingqin Expressway	津秦高速公路	Tianjin - Qinhuangdao				Became a portion of G0321
S11 Coastal Expressway	天津沿海高速公路	Tianjin Coastal			91 km	Portion of G0111
S20 Tanglang Expressway	唐廊高速	Tangshan - Langfang	HE border	Langfang		Also known as S3500
S21 Tangcheng Expressway	塘承高速				87 km	
S30 Jingjin Expressway	京津高速				107 km	
S31 Binhai Ring Expressway	滨海绕城高速	Binhai Ring				
S40 Jingtintang Expressway	京津塘高速公路	Wuqing - Binhai				Redesignated as G0212 in 2022
S41 Tanggang Expressway	塘港高速					Planned
S50 Jinjin Expressway	津晋高速	Binhai - Xiqing			35 km	
S51 Ningjing Expressway	宁静高速公路	Ninghe - Xiqing				
S60 Binshi Expressway	滨石高速					Became a portion of G0211
S61 Jincheng Expressway	津承高速					Planned
S70 Nangang Expressway	南港高速					Planned
S71 Mizhuo Connecting Line						
S82 Dongjiang Connecting Line	东疆联络线					Planned
S83 Jinhan Connecting Line					6 km	
S84 Beijing-Tianjin Connecting Line	京津联络线					
S85 Qinbin Connecting Line	秦滨联络线					
S99 Tianjin Huancheng Expressway	天津环城高速					Planned

S51 was originally Jishan Expressway (蓟汕高速公路)

== Tibet ==
Number and name	Chinese name	Route	Origin	Terminus	Length	Notes
S1 Lagong Expressway	拉贡高速公路	Lhasa - Gonggar County	Lhasa	Lhasa Gonggar International Airport	38 km	Signed as "Airport Expressway" rather than S1; portion of G4218
Zegong Expressway	泽贡高速	Zedang - Chanang - Gonggar County	Zedang	Lhasa Gonggar International Airport		Portion of G4219
Rihe Expressway	日和高速	Shigatse	Shigatse	Shigatse Peace Airport (Heping)		Portion of G4218
S4 Linmi Expressway	林米高速	Linzhi - Mainling County	Linzhi	Nyingchi Mainling Airport		
S5 Laze Expressway	拉泽高速	Lhasa - Zedang	Lhasa	Zedang		Under construction
Changbang Expressway	昌邦高速	Qamdo (Chamdo) - Karuo - Bamda (Bangda)	Qamdo	Qamdo Bamda Airport		Portion of G0613
Shikun Expressway	狮昆高速	Shiquanhe - Ngari - Gunsa (Kunsa)	Shiquanhe	Ngari Gunsa Airport		Portion of G4218
Linla Expressway	林拉 高速	Linzhi - Lhasa	Linzhi	Lhasa		Portion of G4218

== Xinjiang ==
Xinjiang Expressway Numbering Plan 2016-2030

Number and name	Chinese name	Route	Origin	Terminus	Length	Notes
S11 Fuda Expressway	富大高速	Fuyun - Dahuangshan	Kalatongke	Dahuangshan	297 km	
S12 Gaoyi Expressway	高伊高速	Gaochang - Yining	Gaochang	Ili	584 km	Portion of G3035; planned
S13 Sansha Expressway	三莎高速	Sanchakou - Shache	Sanchakou	Yarkant	235 km	
S15 Aba Expressway	阿巴高速	Aral - Bachu	Aral	Maralbishi	327 km	Planned
S16 Maika Expressway	麦喀高速	Maigaiti - Kashi	Makit	Kashgar	144 km	
S17 Dukang Expressway	独康高速	Dushanzi - Kangxiwa	Dushanzi	Kangxiwa	1475 km	Portion of G3033; planned
S18 Taji Expressway	塔吉高速	Takeshiken - Jimunai	Takeshiken (Mongol border)	Jeminay (Kazakh border)	500 km	Under construction
S19 Laoyi Expressway	老伊高速	Laoyemiao - Yizhou	Laoyemiao (Mongol border)	Yizhou	246 km	Planned
S20 Wuke Expressway	乌克高速	Ürümqi - Karamay	Ürümqi	Karamay	290 km	
S21 Awu Expressway	阿乌高速	Aletai - Ürümqi	Fuhai	Ürümqi	355 km	
S22 Wuluo Expressway	梧骆高速	Wutongquan - Luotuoquanzi	Wutongquan	Luotuoquanzi	80 km	Former portion of G7
S23 Jingmu Expressway	精木高速	Jinghe - Muzharte	Jinghe	Muzharte (Kazakh border)	357 km	Planned
S24 Shanku Expressway	鄯库高速	Shanshan - Kumishi	Shanshan	Kumishi	240 km	
S25 Ji'a Expressway	吉阿高速	Jikepulin - Aletai	Jikepulin	Altai	238 km	Planned
S26 Kangyi Expressway	康伊高速	Kangsu - Yirkeshitan	Kangsu	Irkeshtam (Kyrgyz border)	82 km	Portion of G3013
S27 Kahong Expressway	喀红高速	Kashi - Hongqilafu	Shule	Khunjerab (Pakistani border)	426 km	Planned
S30 Buha Expressway	布哈高速	Burqin - Habahe	Burqin	Habahe		Under construction
S31 Keqing Expressway	科青高速	Koktas - Qinghe	Koktas	Qinghe		Planned
S32 Hehe Expressway	和和高速	Hoboksar - Hoxtolgay	Hoboksar	Hoxtolgay		Planned
S33 Er'e Expressway	二额高速	Erdaoqiao - Emin	Erdaoqiao	Emin		Planned
S34 Tuo'e Expressway	托额高速	Toli - Emin	Toli	Emin		Planned
S35 Tayu Expressway	塔裕高速	Tacheng - Yumin	Tacheng	Yumin		Planned
S36 Bowen Expressway	博温高速	Bole - Wenquan	Bole	Wenquan		Planned
S37 Dunni Expressway	墩尼高速	Dunmazha - Nilka	Dunmazha	Nilka		Planned
S38 Talun Expressway	墩尼高速	Taerlake - Luntai	Taerlake	Luntai		Planned
S39 Heyan Expressway	和焉高速	Hejing - Bohu - Yanqi Hui	Hejing	Yanqi Hui		Planned
S40 Miluo Expressway	米罗高速	Milan - Luobu	Milan	Luobu		Planned
S41 Yanka Expressway	盐喀高速	Yanshuigou - Kalayurgan	Yanshuigou	Kalayurgan		Planned
S42 Xixin Expressway	西新高速	Xili - Xinhe	Xili	Xinhe		Planned
S43 Ahe Expressway	阿合高速	Aksu - Akqi	Aksu	Akqi		Planned
S44 Afeng Expressway	阿丰高速	Aksu - Fengshouchang	Aksu	Fengshouchang		Planned
S45 Yitu Expressway	一图高速	Yijianfeng - Tumxuk	Yijianfeng	Tumxuk		Planned
S46 Xiajia Expressway	夏伽高速	Shaptul - Jiashi	Shaptul (Xiaputule)	Jiashi		Planned
S47 Tiyue Expressway	提岳高速	Tigeng - Yuepuhu	Tigeng	Yuepuhu		Planned
S48 Ximai Expressway	希麦高速	Xiyitidun - Maigaiti	Xiyitidun	Maigaiti		Planned
S49 Ai'a Expressway	艾阿高速	Aermudong - Akto	Aermudong	Akto		Planned
S50 Fuhuang Expressway	福黄高速	Fuhaihuangjin - Huanghuagou	Fuhaihuangjin	Huanghuagou		Planned
S51 Wusha Expressway	梧沙高速	Wutongdaquan - Shaquanzi	Wutongdaquan	Shaquanzi		Planned
S52 Ruoha Expressway	若哈高速	Ruoqiang - Hami	Ruoqiang	Hami		Planned
S91 Kashgar Ring Expressway	喀什绕城高速	Kashi City Ring	Kashgar Ring		111 km	Portion of G3012; planned

== Yunnan ==
- S0501 Kunming Ring Expressway

North-South Lines:

- 3. Renhe–Pu'er Expressway (SX5)
- 4. Tonghai–Lüchun Expressway (SX5)
- 6. Shangri-La–Jingdong Expressway (SX5)
- 8. Deqen–Lujiang Expressway (SX5)

East-West Lines:

- 1. Anning–Houqiao Expressway (SX0)
- 4. Tianlian–Malong Expressway (SX0)
- 6. Jinshuihe–Shuangpai Expressway (SX0)

Connecting Lines:

- 1. Shuifu–Suijiang Expressway (SX1)
- 6. Pingyuan–Wenshan Expressway (SX6)

== Zhejiang ==
Zhejiang Expressway Numbering Plan 2010-2030
Lishui Expressway Plan 2014-2030

Number and name	Chinese name	Route	Origin	Terminus	Length	Notes
S1 Yongtaiwen Expressway	甬台温高速	Ningbo - Taizhou - Wenzhou	Jintanggang	Ningbo		
S2 Huhangyong Expressway	沪杭甬高速	Shanghai - Hangzhou - Ningbo	Shentu	Yuhang		Became a portion of G60 and G92; demoted to local expressway in 2021
S4 Hangzhou Airport Expressway	杭州机场高速	Hangzhou Airport	Hangzhou Xixing Bridge	Hangzhou Airport	18 km	
S5 Hangyong Expressway	杭甬高速	Hangzhou - Ningbo	Gaoqiao	Ningbo		Became a portion of G92
S6 Dingdai Expressway	定岱高速公路	Dinghai - Daishan	Dinghai	Daishan (SH border)		
S8 Ciyu Expressway	慈余高速	Cixi - Yuyao	Cixi	Yuyao	22 km	
S9 Sutai Expressway	苏台高速	Suzhou - Taizhou	Lianshi (JS border)	Luqiao	100 km	
S10 Wenzhou Ring Expressway	温州绕城高速	Wenzhou City Ring	Wenzhou Ring		154 km	
S11 Zhajia Expressway	乍嘉高速	Zhapu - Jiaxing	Zhapu	Jiaxing	35 km	
S12 Shenjiahu Expressway	申嘉湖高速	Shanghai - Jiaxing - Huzhou	Jiashan (SH border)	Anji (AH border)	184 km	Known as S32 in Shanghai and S12 in Zhejiang
S13 Lianhang Expressway	练杭高速	Lianshi - Hangzhou	Lianshi	Hangzhou	51 km	
S14 Hangchangyi Expressway	杭长宜高速	Hangzhou - Changxing - Yixing	Hangzhou	Changxing (JS border)	116 km	
S16 Hangzhou North Branch Expressway	杭州北支线	Hangzhou North Branch			16 km	
S16 Hangpu Expressway	杭浦高速	Hangzhou - Pudong	Hangzhou	Hangzhou (G92)		Became a portion of G15 and G92
S17 Hangyong Expressway	杭绍甬高速	Hangzhou - Ningbo	Hangzhou	Andong		Redesignated as G92N in 2013, now a portion of G9221
S19 Zhejiang Coastal Expressway	浙江沿海高速	Zhejiang Coastal	Ningbo	Cangnan (FJ border)		Became a portion of G1523
S20 Chuanshan Port Expressway	穿山疏港高速	Chuanshan Port	Chuanshangang	Ningbo	33 km	
S21 Liuheng Port Expressway	六横疏港高速	Liuheng Port	Ningbo	Liuhenggang	30 km	
S22 Xiangshanwan Port Expressway	象山湾疏港高速	Xiangshanwan Port	Beilun	Ninghua	24 km	Under construction
S23 Shipu Port Expressway	石浦疏港高速	Shipu Port	Shipu	Shipugang	18 km	
S24 Shaozhu Expressway	绍诸高速	Shaoxing - Zhuji	Shangyu	Zhuji	63 km	
S26 Zhuyong Expressway	诸永高速	Zhuji - Yongjia	Zhuji	Wenzhou	226 km	
S27 Dongyong Expressway	东永高速	Dongyang - Yongkang	Dongyang	Yongkang	45 km	
S28 Taijin Expressway	台金高速	Taizhou - Jinhua	Taizhou	Jinhua	158 km	
S29 Xuantong Expressway	宣桐高速	Xuancheng - Tonglu	Lin'an (AH border)	Tonglu		
S30 Zhijiang Bridge	之江大桥	Zhijiang Bridge	Hangzhou (G25)	Hangzhou		
S31 Hangxinjing Expressway	杭新景高速	Hangzhou - Xin'anjiang - Jingdezhen	Jiande	Kaihua (JX border)		Became a portion of G6021
S33 Longli Expressway	龙丽高速	Longyou - Lishui	Longyou	Lishui		Became a portion of G4012
S34 Wenrui Expressway	丽温高速	Wencheng - Rui'an	Wencheng	Rui'an	40 km	
S35 Taishun Branch Line	泰顺支线	Taishun Branch	Wencheng	Taishun (FJ border)		Became a portion of G4012
S36 Longpu Expressway	龙浦高速	Longquan - Pucheng	Longquan	Longquan (FJ border)	23 km	
S37 Sanmen Connecting Line	三门联络线	Sanmen Connecting				Planned
S38 Taizhou City Branch Line	台州市区连接线	Taizhou City Branch			9.1 km	
S39 Wenling Connecting Line	温岭联络线	Wenling Connecting			33 km	Under construction
S42 Keqiao Branch Line	柯桥支线	Keqiao Branch	Hangzhou	Keqiao	23 km	Planned
S45 Yidong Expressway	义东高速	Yiwu - Dongyang	Yiwu	Yongkang	22 km	

- S6 was originally Daizhu Expressway (岱朱高速)
- S9 was originally Sushao Expressway (苏绍高速)
- S34 was originally Liwen Expressway (丽温高速)

== Hong Kong and Macau ==
There are 231.3 kilometres (143.7 mi) of expressways in Hong Kong. Macau has fewer than 50 kilometres (31 mi) of highways, many of which are partially controlled access.

For more see Expressways in Hong Kong and Highways in Macau.

== See also ==
- Expressways of China
- List of primary NTHS expressways
- List of auxiliary NTHS expressways
