= Zuoying =

Zuoying may refer to:

- Zuoying District, Kaohsiung, Taiwan
- Zuoying station (disambiguation)
- Zuoying Township (左营乡), Juancheng County, Heze, Shandong Province, China
- Prince Irgen Gioro Zuoying (伊尔根觉罗·佐鹰), a character in Chinese television drama Scarlet Heart
- S57 Zuoying Expressway (左应高速), a route of Shanxi Expressway is Zuoyun - Yingxian
