= G4012 Liyang–Ningde Expressway =

Expressway in China

Liyang–Ningde Expressway
- 溧阳－宁德高速公路
- Lining Expressway 溧宁高速公路

Route information
- Auxiliary route of G40
- Existed: 12 January 2022–present

Major junctions
- North end: Liyang, Changzhou, Jiangsu
- South end: Fu'an, Ningde, Fujian

Location
- Country: China

Highway system
- National Trunk Highway System; Primary; Auxiliary; National Highways; Transport in China
← G4011	→ G4013

The G4012 Liyang–Ningde Expressway (Chinese: 溧阳－宁德高速公路), commonly referred to as the Lining Expressway (Chinese: 溧宁高速公路), is an expressway that connects Fu'an, Ningde and Liyang, Changzhou in China. It is a spur of G40 Shanghai–Xi'an Expressway and it travels through the provinces of Jiangsu, Zhejiang and Fujian. It is split into many discontiguous sections.

== Connections ==
- Ningbo–Dongguan Expressway: Banzhong Hub
- Changchun–Shenzhen Expressway: Xinchang Hub, Beibu Hub, Yunjing Hub
- Yangzhou–Liyang Expressway: Xinchang Hub
- Shanghai-Chongqing Expressway: Oath Festival Hub
- Hangzhou–Ruili Expressway: Chengcun-jiang Junction
- Shanghai-Kunming Expressway: Lutangjiao Hub
- Hangzhou–Changsha Expressway: Shouchang Hub
