= G1818 Binzhou–Dezhou Expressway =

Road in Shandong, China

Binzhou–Dezhou Expressway
- 滨州－德州高速公路
- Jingde Expressway 滨德高速公路

Route information
- Auxiliary route of G18
- Length: 144 km (89 mi)
- Existed: 2012–present

Major junctions
- West end: G3 / G0322 in Dezhou, Shandong
- East end: G18 / G25 in Binzhou, Shandong

Location
- Country: China

Highway system
- National Trunk Highway System; Primary; Auxiliary; National Highways; Transport in China
← G1817	→ G20

The Binzhou–Dezhou Expressway (Chinese: 滨州–德州高速公路), designated as G1818 and commonly referred to as the Binde Expressway (Chinese: 滨德高速公路), is an expressway in Shandong, China that connects the cities of Binzhou and Dezhou. It intersects with the Beijing-Shanghai Expressway within Laoling.

Construction began on 11 December 2008 and was completed and opened to traffic on 10 June 2012. Previously it was listed as a provincial expressway in Shandong designated as S12 until July 2022.
