= G0321 Dezhou–Shangrao Expressway =

Expressway in China

Dezhou–Shangrao Expressway
- 德州－上饶高速公路
- Deshang Expressway 德上高速公路

Major junctions
- North end: Dezhou
- South end: Shangrao

Location
- Country: China

Highway system
- National Trunk Highway System; Primary; Auxiliary; National Highways; Transport in China
← G0311	→ G0322

The Dezhou–Shangrao Expressway (Chinese: 德州－上饶岛高速公路), designated as G0321 and commonly abbreviated as Deshang Expressway (Chinese: 德上高速), is an expressway in eastern China linking the cities of Dezhou and Shangrao.

It was formerly labeled G3W (G3-west).

== Route ==
Location	km	mi	Exit	Name	Destinations	Notes
G0321 (Dezhou–Shangrao Expressway)
Shandong				Interchange	G3	
Shandong				Xinfu Avenue		
Shandong				G105		Expressway ends here currently
Shandong				Shandong S234		
Shandong				Wucheng North		
Shandong				Zhangnan Interchange	Shandong S087	
Shandong	Wucheng Service Area					
Shandong				Wucheng West	G340 Shandong S318	
Shandong	Service Area					
Shandong				Xiajinxi Interchange	G20	
Shandong				Xiajinxi	G308	
Shandong	Xiajinxi Service Area					
Shandong				Interchange	G2516	
Shandong				Linqing East	Shandong S245	
Shandong	Liaocheng Service Area					
Shandong				Liaocheng North	Shandong S258	
Shandong				Liaocheng West Interchange	Shandong S1	
Shandong				Liaocheng South	Shandong S706 Liaocheng South Outer Ring, Shandong S316	
Shandong				Interchange	G22	
Shandong	Dongchangfu Service Area					
Shandong				Shenxian North	Shandong S316	
Shandong				Shenxian	Shandong S249	
Shandong				Shenxian South Interchange	Shandong S28	
Shandong				Shenxian South	G341, Shandong S324	
Shandong	Service Area					
Shandong				Shenxian Gucheng	X039	
Henan	Fanxian Service Area					
Henan				Fanxian East	Hebei S302	
Henan				Fanxian East Interchange	Henan S26	S26 eastbound under construction
Shandong				Juancheng North	Yanhuang Road	
Shandong	Juancheng Service Area					
Shandong				Juancheng	Shandong S318	
Shandong				Juancheng South	Shandong S339	
Shandong				Dusi	G220	
Shandong				Taipingliuhe Interchange	G35 G1511	
Shandong				Yuncheng	Henan S339	
Shandong				Yuncheng South	Henan S242	
Shandong				Wangguantun Interchange	G35 G1511	
Shandong				Juye West	G327	
Shandong	Juye Service Area					
Shandong				Zhangfeng	Henan S242	
Shandong				Datianji	Henan S328	
Shandong	Chengwu Service Area					
Shandong				Interchange	Zaozhuang-Heze Expressway	
Shandong				Chengwu East	Henan S318	
Shandong				Shanxian North	G518	
Shandong	Shanxian Service Area					
Shandong				Shanxian South	Henan S517	
Shandong				Longwangmiao	Henan S351	
Anhui				Dangshan North	Henan S101	
Anhui	Dangshan Service Area					
Anhui				Dangshan	G310	
Anhui	Dangyong Toll Station					
Henan	Yongdang Toll Station					
Henan				Yongcheng North	Hanxing Avenue	
Henan				Mangdangshan Interchange	G30	
Henan	Yongcheng Service Area					
Henan				Yongcheng	G311 Huaihai Avenue	
Henan				Yongcheng East	Zhongyuan Road	
Henan			1	Interchange	G1516	
Anhui	Huaiyong Toll Station					
Anhui				Yueji Interchange	G1516	
Anhui				Guoyang North	Anhui S238	
Anhui				Guoyang East	Anhui S307	
Anhui	Maji Service Area					
Anhui				Wangtuan Interchange	G36	
Anhui	Mengcheng Service Area					
Anhui				Fengtai North	Anhui S308	
Anhui	Fengtai Service Area					
Anhui				Fengtai	Fengcheng Avenue	
Anhui				Maoji Interchange	Anhui S12	
Anhui				Shouxian	Anhui S310	
Anhui				Anfengtang	Anhui S203	
Anhui				Anfeng	Anhui S203	
Anhui	Cha'an Service Area					
Anhui				Sanjue	X028	
Anhui				Gaodian Interchange	G40	Further route not known yet
Jiangxi	Service Area					
Jiangxi	Service Area					
Jiangxi				Zongyang	G347	
Jiangxi				Chizhou West	G318	
Jiangxi				Yinjiahui Interchange	G50	
Jiangxi				G237		
Jiangxi				Interchange	Jiangxi S42	
Jiangxi				Qimen	G237	
Jiangxi				Yinjiahui Interchange	G56	
Jiangxi				Wuyuan	Jiangxi S304 Jiangxi S308	
Jiangxi				Dexing Interchange	G6021	
Jiangxi				Xingangshan	Jiangxi S202	
Jiangxi				Dexing East Interchange	G6021	
Jiangxi				Damaoshan	X735	
Jiangxi				Sanqingshan	X659	
Jiangxi	Sanqingshan West Service Area					
Jiangxi				Yushan West	Jiangxi S203	
Jiangxi	Shangrao East Rest Area					
Jiangxi				Interchange	G60	
Closed/former; Concurrency terminus; HOV only; Incomplete access; Tolled; Route transition; Unopened
