= G4219 Qüxü–Nêdong Expressway =

Road in Tibet, China

Qüxü–Nêdong Expressway
- 曲水－乃东高速公路
- Qünê Expressway 曲乃高速公路

Route information
- Auxiliary route of G42

Major junctions
- West end: Tibet S1 in Qüxü County, Lhasa, Tibet
- East end: G349 in Nêdong District, Shannan, Tibet

Location
- Country: China

Highway system
- National Trunk Highway System; Primary; Auxiliary; National Highways; Transport in China
← G4218	→ G4221

The G4219 Qüxü–Nêdong Expressway (Chinese: 曲水—乃东高速公路), also referred to as the Qünê Expressway (Chinese: 曲乃高速公路), is an expressway in Tibet Autonomous Region, China that connects Qüxü County to Nêdong District via Zhanang County along the left bank of the Yarlung Tsangpo. The first section opened to traffic on 8 December 2017, however it was originally signposted as a section of China National Highway 349.
