= G4221 Shanghai–Wuhan Expressway =

Expressway in China

Shanghai–Wuhan Expressway
- 上海－武汉高速公路

Location
- Country: China

Highway system
- National Trunk Highway System; Primary; Auxiliary; National Highways; Transport in China
← G4219	→ G4222

G4221 Shanghai–Wuhan Expressway (Chinese: 沪武高速公路) is an expressway in China. It starts at Shanghai, passing through Taicang, Changshu, Jiangyin, Jintan District of Changzhou, Lishui District of Nanjing, Ma'anshan, Chao Lake, Lujiang County, Yuexi County, Yingshan County and Tuanfeng County, ending in Wuhan.

G4221 Huwu Expressway in Hubei Province
