= S9902 Xinle-Yuanshi Expressway =

Road in Hebei, China

S9902 Expressway
- 新乐－元氏高速公路
- Xinyuan Expressway 新元高速
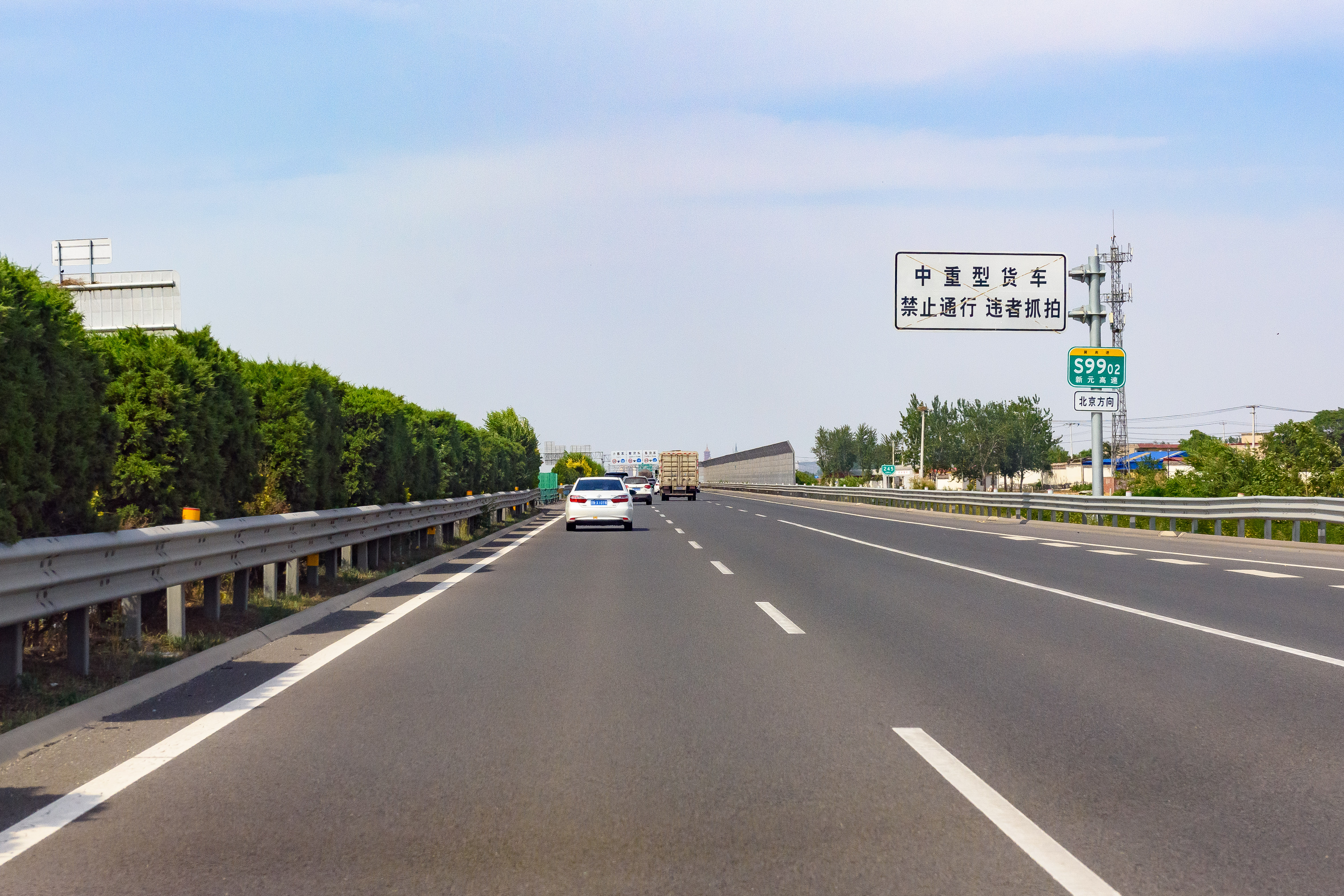
- The S9902 west of Shijiazhuang Zhengding International Airport

Route information
- Length: 83.8 km (52.1 mi)
- Existed: 21 December 2014–present

Major junctions
- North end: Xinle
- Shijiazhuang; Shijiazhuang; Shijiazhuang
- South end: Yuan

Location
- Country: China
- Province: Hebei

Highway system
- Transport in China

S9902 Xinle-Yuanshi Expressway also known as S9902 Xinyuan Expressway is an expressway in Hebei, China. The expressway was formerly part of G4 Jinggang'ao Expressway, but with the opening of a new section bypassing Shijiazhuang and its assignment as G4 Jinggang'ao Expressway, the section running through eastern areas of Shijiazhuang downgraded from national-level to provincial-level and was renamed S9902.

== Detailed itinerary ==
North to South
G4 Jinggang'ao Expressway
G107 Road; S203 Road; S204 Road; Xinle
Shijiazhuang Zhengding International Airport
G2001 Shijiazhuang Ring Expressway; G0211 Tianshi Expressway
S302 Road; Zhengding
Shijiazhuang Metropolitan Area
G1811 Huangshi Expressway
Xizhaotong Service Area
Yuhua Road E Shijiazhuang-Centre; Shijiazhuang Hi-Tech Zone [1号线Line 1] Sea World Station Station
Shijiazhuang Metropolitan Area
G308 Road; Towards Luancheng
Inspection Station
G20 Qingyin Expressway
Yuanshi Service Area
S033 Road; Towards Yuanshi'
G4 Jinggang'ao Expressway
South to North
