= G0323 Jining–Hefei Expressway =

Road in China

Jining–Hefei Expressway
- 济宁－合肥高速公路
- Jihe Expressway 济合高速公路

Route information
- Auxiliary route of G3

Major junctions
- West end: G1511 / Shandong S33 in Rencheng District, Jining, Shandong
- East end: G5011 in Chaohu, Hefei, Anhui

Location
- Country: China

Highway system
- National Trunk Highway System; Primary; Auxiliary; National Highways; Transport in China
← G0322	→ G4

The G0323 Jining–Hefei Expressway (Chinese: 济宁—合肥高速公路), also referred to as the Jihe Expressway (Chinese: 济合高速公路), is an expressway in China that connects Jining, Shandong to Hefei, Anhui.

== Route ==
The expressway starts in Rencheng District, Jining, and passes through Yutai County, Xuzhou, Suzhou, Guzhen County, Bengbu, Fengyang County and Dingyuan County, before terminating in Chaohu, Hefei.
