= Zuoying station =

Zuoying (Chinese: 左營; pinyin: Zǔoyíng) station may refer to the following stations in Kaohsiung, Taiwan:

- Zuoying HSR station, the metro and railway station served by Kaohsiung MRT, Taiwan High Speed Rail and Taiwan Railways Administration, where it is known as Xinzuoying station
- Zuoying–Jiucheng railway station, the exclusive TRA station
