= G0311 Jinan–Liaocheng Expressway =

Road in China

Jinan–Liaocheng Expressway
- 济南－聊城高速公路
- Jiliao Expressway 济聊高速公路

Route information
- Auxiliary route of G3
- Length: 147 km (91 mi)

Major junctions
- West end: Hebei S2201 in Guantao County, Handan, Hebei
- East end: G3 / G35 in Huaiyin District, Jinan, Shandong

Location
- Country: China

Highway system
- National Trunk Highway System; Primary; Auxiliary; National Highways; Transport in China
← G3	→ G0321

The G0311 Jinan–Liaocheng Expressway (Chinese: 济南—聊城高速公路), also referred to as the S1 Jiliao Expressway (Chinese: 济聊高速公路), is an under construction expressway in China that connects Jinan, Shandong to Handan, Hebei.

== History ==
In July 2010, the toll collection system upgrade of Jiliao Expressway was completed which included electronic toll collection.

In July 2022, the Jinan-Liaocheng section of the Jiliao Expressway was upgraded to a spur route (numbered G0311) of the G3 Beijing-Taipei Expressway in the national expressway network.

== Route ==
The expressway starts in Huaiyin District, Jinan, then passes through Dezhou and Liaocheng, before terminating in Guantao County, Handan.
