= G0322 Beijing–Dezhou Expressway =

Expressway in Beijing, Hebei and Shandong provinces of China

Beijing–Dezhou Expressway
- 北京－德州高速公路
- Jingde Expressway 京德高速公路

Route information
- Auxiliary route of G3
- Length: 280 km (170 mi)

Major junctions
- North end: S330 in Beijing
- South end: S072 / S67 in Jing County, Hebei

Location
- Country: China

Highway system
- National Trunk Highway System; Primary; Auxiliary; National Highways; Transport in China
← G0321	→ G0323

The Beijing–Dezhou Expressway (Chinese: 北京—德州高速公路), designated as G0322 and commonly referred to as the Jingde Expressway (Chinese: 京德高速公路), is an expressway in China that connects the cities of Beijing and Dezhou.

== Sections ==
=== Beijing ===
The Jingde Expressway serves as a connection between the north and south terminals of Beijing Daxing International Airport.

=== Hebei ===
Jingde Expressway in Hebei is composed of two parts which were incorporated in 2017 for the development of the provincial comprehensive transportation system. The Hebei section of Jingde Expressway is numbered S3901.

The route goes south through Yongqing County, Bazhou City, Renqiu City, Hejian City, Xian County, Fucheng County, and Jing County. The total length of this section is 257 kilometers and was completed on 29 May 2021.

=== Shandong ===
The section of the Binde Expressway to Dezhou is a part of the Jingde Expressway which started construction on 11 December 2008 and was completed and opened to traffic on 10 June 2012.
