= G6021 Hangzhou–Changsha Expressway =

Road in China

Hangzhou–Changsha Expressway
- 杭州－长沙高速公路
- Hangchang Expressway 杭长高速公路

Route information
- Auxiliary route of G60
- Length: 761 km (473 mi)

Major junctions
- West end: Changsha Toll Station in Changsha County, Changsha, Hunan
- East end: G25 in Jiande, Hangzhou, Zhejiang

Location
- Country: China

Highway system
- National Trunk Highway System; Primary; Auxiliary; National Highways; Transport in China
← G6012	→ G6022

The G6021 Hangzhou–Changsha Expressway (Chinese: 杭州－长沙高速公路), commonly referred to as the Hangchang Expressway (Chinese: 杭长高速公路), is an expressway in China that connects the cities of Hangzhou, Zhejiang and Changsha, Hunan.

== Route ==
The route starts in Hangzhou and passes through Kaihua County, Dexing, Yugan County, Nanchang, Fengxin County, Tonggu County, Liuyang, before terminating in Changsha.

The expressway connects the provinces of Zhejiang, Jiangxi, Hunan and was fully opened to traffic on 30 June 2022.
