= G1112 Jishuang Expressway =

Expressway in Jilin Province, China

Jishuang Expressway
- 集安－双辽高速公路
- Jishuang Expressway 集双高速公路
- The Jishuang Expressway is the bold gold line on the map

Route information
- Auxiliary route of G11

Major junctions
- Southeast end: Ji'an, Jilin
- Northwest end: Shuangliao, Jilin

Location
- Country: China

Highway system
- National Trunk Highway System; Primary; Auxiliary; National Highways; Transport in China
← G1111	→ G1113

The G1112 Ji'an–Shuangliao Expressway (Chinese: 集安—双辽高速公路), commonly referred to as the Jishuang Expressway (Chinese: 集双高速公路), is an expressway that connects the cities of Shuangliao, Jilin, China, and Ji'an, Jilin. The Jishuang Expressway passes through Shuangliao, Siping, Liaoyuan, and Tonghua, before finally ending in Ji'an.

The expressway's southeastern terminus, the town of Taiwang in Ji'an, is connected to the North Korean city of Manpo through the Ji'an Yalu River Border Road Bridge (Chinese: 集安至满浦界河公路大桥), which crosses the Yalu River. This bridge, the subject of international attention, was completed in 2016, but was only opened to traffic on April 8, 2019. North Korea has plans to extend the Pyongyang-Huichon Expressway to the border at Manpo. The expressway is a spur of G11 Hegang–Dalian Expressway.

== History ==
In November, 2015, the section of the expressway connecting the center of Tonghua to Meihekou, a county-level city in the northwestern corner of Tonghua's administrative boundaries, was opened to traffic.

On September 28, 2019, the section of the expressway connecting the southeastern terminus of Ji'an to Tonghua, known as the Jitong Expressway (Chinese: 集通高速公路), was completed.

On September 28, 2020, the section of the expressway linking the northwestern terminus of Shuangliao to Dongfeng County in Liaoyuan was completed.

== Detailed Itinerary ==
From East to West
G11 Heda Expressway
Service Area
G303 Road; Sanyuanpu; Tonghua Sanyuanpu Airport
G303 Road; Liuhe-South
G303 Road; Liuhe-North
G202 Road; Meihekou
Meihekou Service Area
G202 Road; Meihekou
G1212 Shenji Expressway
G303 Road; S104 Road; Dongfeng
Continues as G4512 Shuangliao–Nenjiang Expressway
From West to East
