= G1212 Shenyang–Jilin Expressway =

Road in China

Shenyang–Jilin Expressway
- 沈阳－吉林高速公路
- Shenji Expressway 沈吉高速公路

Route information
- Auxiliary route of G12
- Length: 372 km (231 mi)

Major junctions
- South end: G1501 in Shenyang, Liaoning
- North end: West Jiefang Road, Jilin City, Jilin

Location
- Country: China

Highway system
- National Trunk Highway System; Primary; Auxiliary; National Highways; Transport in China
← G1211	→ G1213

The G1212 Shenyang–Jilin Expressway (Chinese: 沈阳—吉林高速公路), commonly referred to as the Shenji Expressway (Chinese: 沈吉高速公路), is an expressway in China that connects the cities of Shenyang, Liaoning, and Jilin City, Jilin. It is a spur of G12 Hunchun–Ulanhot Expressway.

== Detailed Itinerary ==
From North to South
Continues as Jiefang W. Road
Jilin Toll Station
(31)	G1201 Jilin Ring Expressway
Jilin South Service Area
Jilin Metropolitan Area
	G202 Road; Yongji
	G202 Road; Shuanghe
Yantongshan Service Area
	S22 Dake Expressway (To be Renamed G12S Yanchang Expressway)
	G202 Road; Mingcheng
	S209 Road; Panshi
Panshi Service Area
	S26 Fuchang Expressway
	S103 Road; Yizuoying-Niuxinding
	G1112 Jishuang Expressway
	G303 Road; Meihekou
Dongmei Service Area
	Dayang
	G202 Road; Shancheng
Dawan Toll Station
Jilin Province; Liaoning Province
Caoshi Service Area
	G202 Road; Caoshi
	G202 Road; Ying'emen
	S303 Road; Towards G202 Road; Qingyuan
	G202 Road Beisanjia Service Area Beisanjia
	G202 Road; Beikouqian-Nankouqian
75	S10 Futong Expressway; G202 Road; S202 Road; Nanzamu-Beizamu
45	G202 Road; X050 Road; Zhangdang
Fushun Metropolitan Area
25	S106 Road; Fushun-East
	G202 Road; Fushun-West
Fushun Service Area
16	G202 Road; S104 Road; Fushun-Wanghua
Fushun Metropolitan Area
8	S107 Road Shenyang Expo Garden; Shenyang Botanical Garden Dongling
Shenyang Metropolitan Area
0	G1501 Shenyang Ring Expressway
Shenyang East Toll Station
	Dongwang N. St. Shenyang-Centre
From South to North
