= G12 Hunchun–Ulanhot Expressway =

Road in China

Hunchun–Ulanhot Expressway
- 珲春－乌兰浩特高速公路
- Hunwu Expressway 珲乌高速公路

Route information
- Part of AH32
- Length: 926.22 km (575.53 mi)

Major junctions
- East end: Jilin S201 in Hunchun, Jilin
- G1 in Changchun, Jilin; G45 in Songyuan, Jilin
- West end: G111 in Ulanhot, Inner Mongolia

Location
- Country: China

Highway system
- National Trunk Highway System; Primary; Auxiliary; National Highways; Transport in China
← G1131	→ G1211

The Hunchun–Ulanhot Expressway (Chinese: 珲春—乌兰浩特高速公路), designated as G12 and commonly referred to as the Hunwu Expressway (Chinese: 珲乌高速公路) is a 926.22-kilometre-long expressway (575.53 mi) in the People's Republic of China that connects the cities of Hunchun, Jilin and Ulanhot, Inner Mongolia. The route parallels much of China National Highway 302.

== Detailed itinerary ==
From East to West
Hunchun Port; Russia; Towards AH6 A189 Highway; Kraskino
	Hunchun
Under Construction
	S201 Road; Hunchun; Hunchun-Quanhe Port; Tumen River Bridge; Kyonghung, North Korea
	G302 Road; Hunchun
Hunchun Toll Station
	X141 Road; Liangshui
Mentu Service Area
64	G302 Road; Tumen; Towards Tumen Border Bridge; Namyang, North Korea
85	S1116 Wangda Expressway
91	G302 Road; S202 Road (To be Renamed G12S Yanchang Expressway); Yanji
107	X123 Road; Chaoyangchuan-Yanji
	S1116 Wangda Expressway (To be renamed G12S Yanchang Expressway)
Yanji Service Area
147	X121 Road; Antu
Antu Service Area
194	G302 Road; Dahitou (Dasŏndu)
211	G201 Road; Dunhua
	G11 Heda Expressway
Dunhua Service Area
245	G302 Road; Huangnihe
Huangnihe Service Area
276	G302 Road; Huangsongdian
311	S210 Road; Jiaohe
Jiaohe Service Area
325	S210 Road; Xinzhan
363	G302 Road; Tiangang
Jilin Metropolitan Area
Jiamenfeng Service Area
378	G1201 Jilin Ring Expressway; G302 Road; Jilin-Centre
Concurrent with G1201 Jilin Ring Expressway
	G1211 Jihei Expressway
389	G202 Road; Jilin-Centre
397	Jiuzhan; Jilin-Centre
Concurrent with G1201 Jilin Ring Expressway
	G1201 Jilin Ring Expressway
406	X031 Road; Jilin-Centre
Service Area
Jilin Metropolitan Area
452	S102 Road; S206 Road
Shitoukoumen Service Area
Changchun Metropolitan Area
466	Changchun Longjia International Airport Changchun Luaihuashan Ski Resort
	Wukaihe Ave. Quanyan
483	AH31 G1 Jingha Expressway; G2501 Changchun Ring Expressway; S102 Road; Orient Square Museum of the Imperial Palace of the Manchu State Changchun-Centre
Concurrent with AH31 G1 Jingha Expressway; Concurrent with G2501 Changchun Ring Expressway
(983)	S101 Road; Dongrong Road; Changchun-Centre; Xinglongshan
(993)	North Yuanda Street; Towards G102 Road; Changchun-Centre
Concurrent with AH31 G1 Jingha Expressway
42 (995)	AH31 G1 Jingha Expressway
Chuncheng Service Area
Concurrent with G2501 Changchun Ring Expressway
509 (36)	G2501 Changchun Ring Expressway; Changchun-Centre
Changchun Metropolitan Area
533	G302 Road; Kai'an
Huajia Service Area
561	S001 Road; X006 Road; Nong'an-West
568	G302 Road; Baota St. Nong'an-North
591	G302 Road; Halahai
Wangfu Service Area
614	G302 Road; Wangfu
Songyuan Metropolitan Area
646	G45 Daqing Expressway; G1202 Songyuan Ring Expressway
Concurrent with G45 Daqing Expressway; Concurrent with G1202 Songyuan Ring Expressway
652	G203 Road; Songyuan-Centre
Concurrent with G45 Daqing Expressway; Concurrent with G1202 Songyuan Ring Expressway
657	G45 Daqing Expressway; G1202 Songyuan Ring Expressway
Songyuan Service Area
Songyuan Metropolitan Area
678	G302 Road; Xinmiao-Chanshan; X150 Road Qagan Nur Tourist Area
Da'an Service Area
	G302 Road; Da'an
	Anguang; Towards G302 Road
Anguang Service Area
	G302 Road; Sheli
Baicheng Metropolitan Area
	G302 Road; Daobao
Daobao Service Area
	G1204 Baicheng Ring Expressway; G4512 Shuannen Expressway
Concurrent with G1204 Baicheng Ring Expressway
	G302 Road; Baicheng-Centre
	S207 Road; Baicheng-Centre
Under Construction
Concurrent with G1204 Baicheng Ring Expressway
	G1204 Baicheng Ring Expressway
	G302 Road; Ping'an
	G302 Road; Lingxia
Baicheng Metropolitan Area
Jilin Province; Inner Mongolia Autonomous Region
Shitou Jinzi Service Area
904	G302 Road; Ulanhot Economic Development Zone
Ulanhot Metropolitan Area
Wulanhada Service Area
919	G302 Road; Ulanhot-East
	G111 Road; Ulanhot-North
From West to East
