= G1113 Dandong–Fuxin Expressway =

Expressway in Liaoning Province, China

Dandong–Fuxin Expressway
- 丹东－阜新高速公路
- Danfu Expressway 丹阜高速公路

Route information
- Auxiliary route of G11
- Part of AH1

Major junctions
- Southeast end: G11 in Dandong, Liaoning
- Northwest end: Fuxin, Liaoning (when complete); G2511 / G91 in Xinmin, Liaoning (current)

Location
- Country: China

Highway system
- National Trunk Highway System; Primary; Auxiliary; National Highways; Transport in China
← G1112	→ G1115

The G1113 Dandong–Fuxin Expressway (Chinese: 丹东—阜新高速公路), commonly referred to as the Danfu Expressway (Chinese: 丹阜高速公路) is an expressway that connects the cities of Dandong, Liaoning, China, and Fuxin, Liaoning. Dandong is on the border with North Korea, and the Sino–Korean Friendship Bridge provides a border crossing into North Korea. The expressway is a spur of G11 Hegang–Dalian Expressway and is also part of Asian Highway 1. It is located entirely in Liaoning Province.

The final section from Xinmin to Fuxin is in planning.

The expressway connects the following cities, all of which are in Liaoning Province:

- Dandong
- Benxi
- Shenyang
- Xinmin
- Fuxin

== Detailed Itinerary ==
From East to West
(1184)	G11 Heda Expressway
1	G304 Road; Dandong-Centre
Dandong Metropolitan Area
12	G304 Road; Wulongbei-Tangshancheng
Fengcheng Service Area
41	S309 Road; Fengcheng
72	G304 Road; Liujiahe
86	G304 Road; Tongyuanbao
Tongyuanpu Service Area
97	G304 Road; Caohekou
122	G304 Road; Xiamatang-Lianshanguan
134	G304 Road; Nanfen
143 (0 A-B)	G91 Liaozhong Ring Expressway
144	X021 Road; Towards G304 Road; Qiaotou
153	Benxi-South
160	S106 Road; S305 Road; Benxi-Centre
166	S106 Road; Benxi-North; Gaotaizi
174	G304 Road; X502 Road; Huolianzhai
180	G304 Road; Shiqiaozi; Benxi Development Zone Shiqiaozi Service Area
185	G304 Road; S304 Road; Waitoushan
194	S107 Road; Towards G304 Road; Yaoqianhutun-Baiqingzhai
Liuqianhu Service Area
198	G304 Road; Tonggou
209	Shenyang Taoxian International Airport
213	Quyuan Road; Hunnan
217	G1501 Shenyang Ring Expressway; Hunhe St. Shenyang-Centre
Concurrent with G1501 Shenyang Ring Expressway
(62)	S101 Road; Baitabao
Shenyang Metropolitan Area
	Shengli St. S. Shenyang-West
	Shensuxi Hwy. Shenyang-West
(70) (0)	AH31 G15 Shenhai Expressway
	Yangguang Rd. Shenyang-Centre
(77)	S102 Road; S109 Road Towards Sihaojie Station
(80)	G102 Road; S109 Road; Shenxin Rd.
(0)	AH1 G1 Jingha Expressway; G102 Road; G202 Road; S109 Road
Shenyang Metropolitan Area
Concurrent with G1 Jingha Expressway
(5)	G304 Road
Concurrent with G1501 Shenyang Ring Expressway; Concurrent with G1 Jingha Expressway
255 A-B (11)	G1501 Shenyang Ring Expressway AH31 G1 Jingha Expressway
259	Shenbei W. Rd. Zaohua
274	S107 Road; Guanghua
296	G91 Liaozhong Ring Expressway
Continues as G2511 Xinlu Expressway
From West to East
