= G1116 Yichun–Bei'an Expressway =

Road in China

Yichun–Bei'an Expressway
- 伊春－北安高速公路
- Yibei Expressway 伊北高速公路

Route information
- Auxiliary route of G11

Major junctions
- West end: G1211 / G1213 / Heilongjiang S12 in Bei'an, Heihe, Heilongjiang
- East end: G1111 in Wucui District, Yichun, Heilongjiang

Location
- Country: China

Highway system
- National Trunk Highway System; Primary; Auxiliary; National Highways; Transport in China
← G1115	→ G1117

The G1116 Yichun–Bei'an Expressway (Chinese: 伊春—北安高速公路), also referred to as the Yibei Expressway (Chinese: 伊北高速公路), is an expressway in Heilongjiang, China that connects Yichun to Bei'an via Qing'an County and Suiling County. The expressway was opened to traffic on 28 September 2012 as a part of Heilongjiang Provincial Expressway S12, and was later designated as a national expressway on 4 July 2022.
