= G1215 Songjiang–Changbaishan Expressway =

Road in China

Songjiang–Changbaishan Expressway
- 松江－长白山高速公路
- Songchang Expressway 松长高速公路

Route information
- Auxiliary route of G12
- Length: 13.74 km (8.54 mi)
- Existed: 30 November 2020–present

Major junctions
- North end: G1221 in Songjiang, Antu County, Yanbian, Jilin
- South end: X187 in Erdaobaihe, Antu County, Yanbian, Jilin

Location
- Country: China

Highway system
- National Trunk Highway System; Primary; Auxiliary; National Highways; Transport in China
← G1213	→ G1216

The G1215 Songjiang–Changbaishan Expressway (Chinese: 松江—长白山高速公路), also referred to as the Songchang Expressway (Chinese: 松长高速公路), is an expressway in Jilin, China that connects Songjiang to Erdaobaihe. The entire route is located within Antu County and has a total length of 13.74 km (8.54 mi), making it one of the shortest NTHS expressways in China. Construction began in October 2016 and it was opened to traffic on 30 November 2020.
