= Songyuan Ring Expressway =

Road in Jilin, China

Songyuan Ring Expressway
- 松原绕城高速公路

Route information
- Auxiliary route of G12
- Length: 57.2 km (35.5 mi)

Major junctions
- Orbital around Songyuan, Jilin

Location
- Country: China

Highway system
- National Trunk Highway System; Primary; Auxiliary; National Highways; Transport in China
← G1201	→ G1204

The Songyuan Ring Expressway (Chinese: 松原绕城高速), designated as G12_{02} is an expressway in Northwestern Chinese province of Jilin going around the city of Songyuan. This expressway is a branch of G12 Hunwu Expressway.

== Detailed itinerary ==
Counterclockwise
0 (646)	G12 Hunwu Expressway; G1202 Songyuan Ring Expressway
(195)	G302 Road; Songyuan-South
Longhua Songhua River Bridge
(186)	S301 Road; Songyuan-East; Shanyou Longhua Temple
Concurrent with G45 Daqing Expressway
21	G45 Daqing Expressway
35	Hexi Rd. Songyuan-North
Songyuan Songhua River Suspension Bridge
40	Songyuan Rd. Songyuan-Centre
(657)	G12 Hunwu Expressway; G45 Daqing Expressway
Concurrent with G12 Hunwu Expressway; Concurrent with G45 Daqing Expressway
(652)	G203 Road; Songyuan-Centre
Concurrent with G12 Hunwu Expressway
(0) (646)	G12 Hunwu Expressway; G1202 Songyuan Ring Expressway
Clockwise
