= Jilin Ring Expressway =

Road in Jilin, China

Jilin Ring Expressway
- 吉林绕城高速公路

Route information
- Auxiliary route of G12
- Length: 72.0 km (44.7 mi)

Major junctions
- Orbital around Jilin, Jilin

Location
- Country: China

Highway system
- National Trunk Highway System; Primary; Auxiliary; National Highways; Transport in China
← G12	→ G1202

The Jilin Ring Expressway (Chinese: 吉林绕城高速), designated as G12_{01} is an expressway in Northw Northwestern Chinese province of Jilin going around the city of Jilin. This expressway is a branch of G12 Hunwu Expressway.

== Detailed Itinerary ==
clockwise
0 (378)	G12 Hunwu Expressway; G1201 Jilin Ring Expressway G302 Road; Jilin-Centre
	X029 Road; Jilin-East Beihua University
	Jilin-South Ashihada Stone Inscriptions
Lanqi Great Bridge
	G202 Road; Jilin-Centre
31	G1212 Shenji Expressway; Jiefang W Rd. Jilin-Centre
	G12 Hunwu Expressway
Concurrent with G12 Hunwu Expressway
(397)	Jiuzhan; Jilin-Centre
(389)	G202 Road; Jilin-Centre
	G1211 Jihei Expressway
Concurrent with G12 Hunwu Expressway
(0) (378)	G12 Hunwu Expressway; G1201 Jilin Ring Expressway G302 Road; Jilin-Centre
Counterclockwise
