= G2501 Changchun Ring Expressway =

Road in China

Changchun Ring Expressway
- 长春绕城高速公路

Route information
- Length: 57 km (35 mi)

Major junctions
- Orbital around Changchun

Location
- Country: China

Highway system
- National Trunk Highway System; Primary; Auxiliary; National Highways; Transport in China
← G25	→ G2502

The Changchun Ring Expressway (Chinese: 长春绕城高速), designated as G2501 (formerly G0102), is an expressway in northeastern China orbiting the city of Changchun. This expressway is a branch of G1 Jingha Expressway.

== Route ==
The route is entirely located in Changchun Metropolitan Area.

Counterclockwise
1	AH31 G1 Jingha Expressway; G2501 Changchun Ring Expressway
	Guigu Street; Changchun-Centre
10	Dezhong St; Tengfei St; Towards G102 Road; FAW Group (Yiqi); Changchun-Centre
	G25 Changshen Expressway
24	S106 Road; Changchun-Centre; Towards Changling
33	G302 Road; Qingnian Road; Changchun-Centre; Towards Helong
36	AH32 G12 Hunwu Expressway; Changchun-Centre
Concurrent with AH32 G12 Hunwu Expressway
Chuncheng Service Area
42 (995)	AH31 G1 Jingha Expressway
Concurrent with AH31 G1 Jingha Expressway
(993)	North Yuanda Street; Towards G102 Road; Changchun-Centre
(983)	S101 Road; Dongrong Road; Changchun-Centre; Xinglongshan
Concurrent with AH32 G12 Hunwu Expressway
(977 A-B)	AH32 G12 Hunwu Expressway; Orient Square Museum of the Imperial Palace of the Manchu State Changchun-Centre
969	S102 Road Jinxin Street Station
962	S1 Changchang Expressway; Yatai Street; Changchun-Centre
Changchun Service Area
Concurrent with AH31 G1 Jingha Expressway
1 (949)	G2501 Changchun Ring Expressway
Continues as AH31 G1 Jingha Expressway
Clockwise
