= G1118 Fusong–Changbai Expressway =

Road in China

Fusong–Changbai Expressway
- 抚松－长白高速公路
- Wuyin Expressway 抚长高速公路

Route information
- Auxiliary route of G11
- Length: 113.26 km (70.38 mi)

Major junctions
- North end: G11 in Jingyu County, Baishan, Jilin
- South end: Changbai Korean Autonomous County, Baishan, Jilin

Location
- Country: China

Highway system
- National Trunk Highway System; Primary; Auxiliary; National Highways; Transport in China
← G1117	→ G1119

The G1118 Fusong–Changbai Expressway (Chinese: 抚松—长白高速公路), also referred to as the Fuchang Expressway (Chinese: 抚长高速公路), is an under construction expressway in Jilin, China that connects Fusong County to Changbai Korean Autonomous County. The first section was opened to traffic on 29 September 2015.
