= G4511 Longnan–Heyuan Expressway =

Road in China

Longnan–Heyuan Expressway
- 龙南－河源高速公路
- Longhe Expressway 龙河高速公路
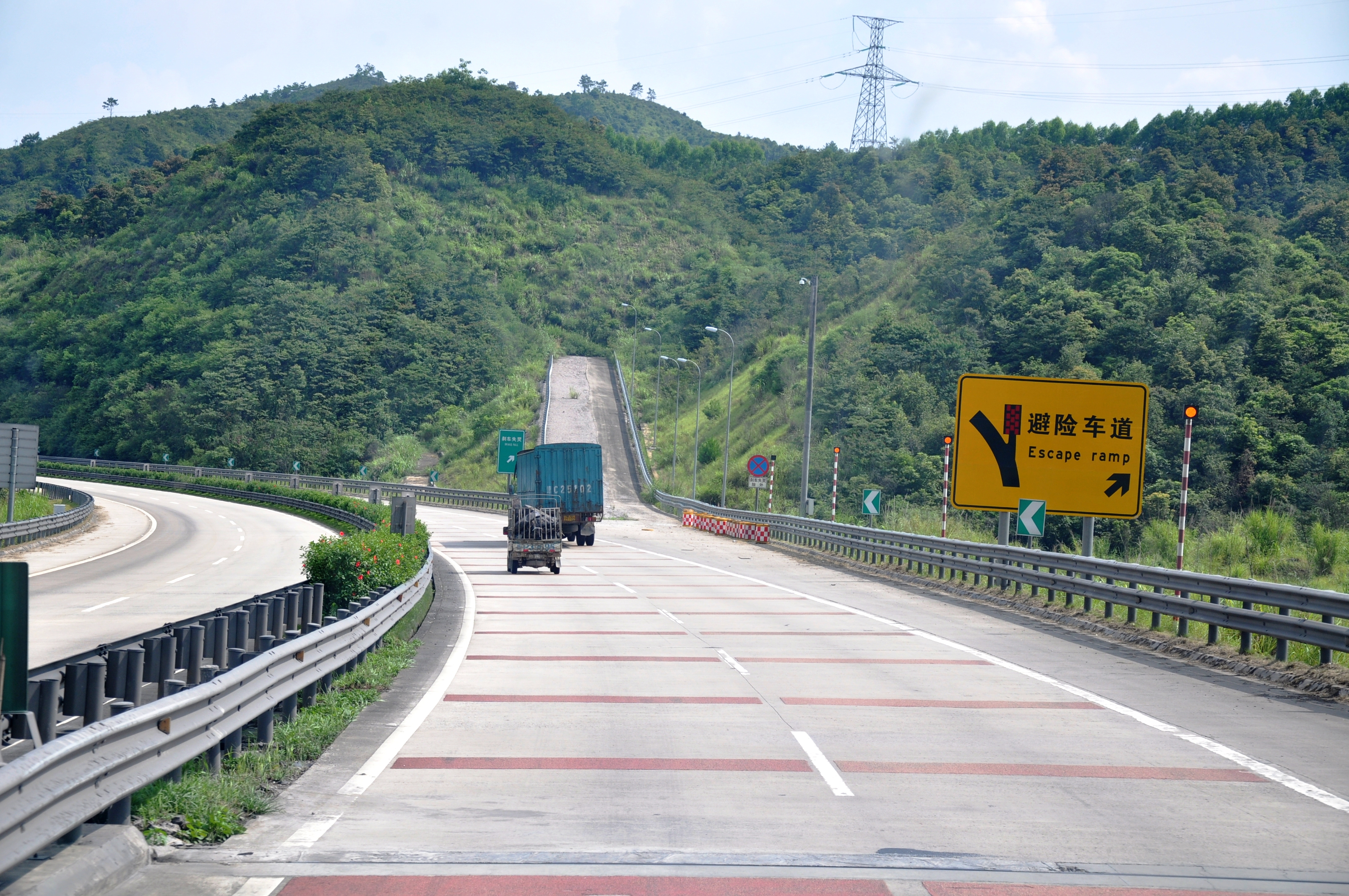
- The Longnan–Heyuan Expressway, with an escape ramp shown.

Route information
- Auxiliary route of G45
- Length: 127.87 km (79.45 mi)

Major junctions
- North end: G45 / G105 in Longnan County, Ganzhou, Jiangxi
- G205 in Dongyuan County, Heyuan, Guangdong
- South end: G25 / G35 in Dongyuan County, Heyuan, Guangdong

Location
- Country: China

Highway system
- National Trunk Highway System; Primary; Auxiliary; National Highways; Transport in China
← G4501	→ G4512

The G4511 Longnan–Heyuan Expressway (Chinese: 龙南—河源高速公路), commonly referred to as the Longhe Expressway (Chinese: 龙河高速公路), is a 127.87-kilometre-long Chinese expressway (79.45 mi) that connects Longnan County, a county under the administration of the city of Ganzhou in the province of Jiangxi, and Dongyuan County, a county under the administration of the city of Heyuan, in the province of Guangdong. The expressway is a spur of the G45 Daqing–Guangzhou Expressway.

== Route ==
At its northern end, the expressway begins in Longnan County, Ganzhou, in Jiangxi province, at a future interchange with G45 Daqing–Guangzhou Expressway and an exit to China National Highway 105. Currently, the expressway continues north as the G45 Daqing–Guangzhou Expressway. However, when an extension of G45 to the west is completed between Longnan County and the city of Guangdong, a three-way interchange will be created between the Longnan–Heyuan Expressway and Daqing–Guangzhou Expressway.

The expressway traverses through mountainous terrain, utilizing numerous tunnels and featuring escape ramps. In Jiangxi province, the expressway parallels much of China National Highway 105. The expressway also parallels the Beijing–Kowloon Railway between Longnan County and Heping County, a county under the administration of Heyuan in Guangdong. Past Heping County, the Beijing–Kowloon Railway curves southeastward toward Longchuan County before curving southwestward, taking a more lengthy route to reach the city centre of Heyuan, while the expressway proceeds directly south toward Heyuan.

At its southern end, the expressway parallels China National Highway 205 for a section between the Dengta exit and the expressway's southern terminus with the concurrent G25 Changchun–Shenzhen and G35 Jinan–Guangzhou expressways.
