= G1131 Mudanjiang–Yanji Expressway =

Road in China

Mudanjiang–Yanji Expressway
- 牡丹江－延吉高速公路
- Muyan Expressway 牡延高速公路

Route information
- Auxiliary route of G11

Major junctions
- North end: G11 in Ning'an, Mudanjiang, Heilongjiang
- South end: G12 in Yanji, Yanbian Korean Autonomous Prefecture, Jilin

Location
- Country: China

Highway system
- National Trunk Highway System; Primary; Auxiliary; National Highways; Transport in China
← G1119	→ G12

The G1131 Mudanjiang–Yanji Expressway (Chinese: 牡丹江—延吉高速公路), also referred to as the Muyan Expressway (Chinese: 牡延高速公路), is an under construction expressway in China that will connect Mudanjiang, Heilongjiang to Yanji, Jilin. The first section from Wangqing County to Yanji was opened to traffic in October 2011.
