= G4513 Naiman Banner–Yingkou Expressway =

Road in China

Naiman Banner–Yingkou Expressway
- 奈曼旗－营口高速公路
- Naiying Expressway 奈营高速公路

Route information
- Auxiliary route of G45

Major junctions
- North end: G45 in Naiman Banner, Tongliao, Inner Mongolia
- South end: G15 in Dashiqiao, Yingkou, Liaoning

Location
- Country: China

Highway system
- National Trunk Highway System; Primary; Auxiliary; National Highways; Transport in China
← G4512	→ G4515

The G4513 Naiman Banner–Yingkou Expressway (Chinese: 奈曼旗—营口高速公路), also referred to as the Naiying Expressway (Chinese: 奈营高速公路), is an expressway in China that connects Naiman Banner, Inner Mongolia to Yingkou, Liaoning.

== Route ==
=== Inner Mongolia ===
Also known as the Naibai Expressway, with a total length of 57.263 kilometers, construction started on 12 July 2016 and was opened to traffic on 7 April 2021.

=== Liaoning ===
The route in Liaoning travels via the cities of Fuxin and Panjin and was previously numbered as Liaoning Expressway S21.

==== Provincial boundary to Fuxin ====
Construction of the section north of Fuxin started on 23 February 2021 and was opened to traffic on 29 September 2023.

==== Fuxin to Panjin ====
Construction of the southern section started in September 2009 and opened to traffic on 31 July 2013. The northern section started construction in March 2012 and opened to traffic on 1 November 2013.

==== Panjin to Yingkou ====
The section from Panjin to Yingkou is part of the G16 Dandong–Xilinhot Expressway. Construction began in November 1999 and it was opened to traffic on 23 August 2002.
