= G1115 Jixi–Jiansanjiang Expressway =

Road in China

Jixi–Jiansanjiang Expressway
- 鸡西－建三江高速公路
- Jijian Expressway 鸡建高速公路

Route information
- Auxiliary route of G11

Major junctions
- North end: G1012 in Fujin City, Jiamusi, Heilongjiang
- South end: G11 in Didao District, Jixi, Heilongjiang

Location
- Country: China

Highway system
- National Trunk Highway System; Primary; Auxiliary; National Highways; Transport in China
← G1113	→ G1116

The G1115 Jixi–Jiansanjiang Expressway (Chinese: 鸡西—建三江高速公路), also referred to as the Jijian Expressway (Chinese: 鸡建高速公路), is an expressway in Heilongjiang, China that connects Jixi to Jiansanjiang via Mishan and Hulin. It was previously designated as Heilongjiang Provincial Expressway S11 and was fully opened to traffic on 26 September 2012.
