= List of NTHS expressways =

- List of primary NTHS expressways
- List of auxiliary NTHS expressways
