= G1117 Suihua–Bei'an Expressway =

Road in China

Suihua–Bei'an Expressway
- 绥化－北安高速公路
- Suibei Expressway 绥北高速公路

Route information
- Auxiliary route of G11
- Length: 208.05 km (129.28 mi)

Major junctions
- North end: G1211 / G1213 / Heilongjiang S12 in Bei'an, Heihe, Heilongjiang
- South end: G1111 in Beilin District, Suihua, Heilongjiang

Location
- Country: China

Highway system
- National Trunk Highway System; Primary; Auxiliary; National Highways; Transport in China
← G1116	→ G1118

The G1117 Suihua–Bei'an Expressway (Chinese: 绥化—北安高速公路), also referred to as the S15 Suibei Expressway (Chinese: 绥北高速公路), is an expressway in Heilongjiang, China that connects Suihua to Bei'an via Wangkui County and Hailun. The expressway was opened to traffic on 30 September 2011, and was later designated as a national expressway on 4 July 2022.
