= G5613 Baoshan–Lushui Expressway =

Road in China

Baoshan–Lushui Expressway
- 保山－泸水高速公路
- Baolu Expressway 保泸高速公路
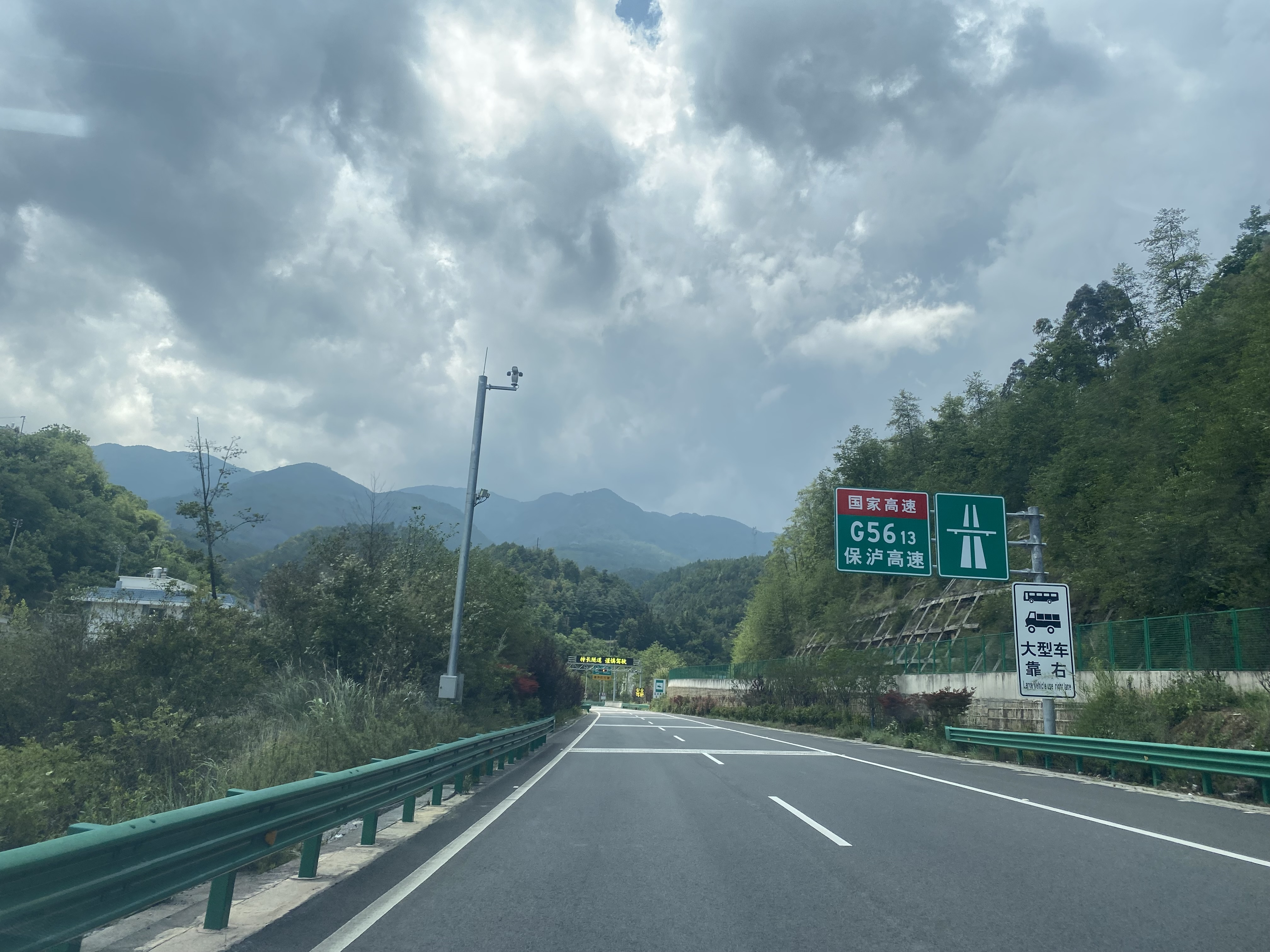

Route information
- Auxiliary route of G56
- Length: 85.17 km (52.92 mi)

Major junctions
- North end: S228 in Lushui, Nujiang Lisu Autonomous Prefecture, Yunnan
- South end: G56 in Longyang District, Baoshan, Yunnan

Location
- Country: China

Highway system
- National Trunk Highway System; Primary; Auxiliary; National Highways; Transport in China
← G5612	→ G5615

The G5613 Baoshan–Lushui Expressway (Chinese: 保山—泸水高速公路), also referred to as the Baolu Expressway (Chinese: 保泸高速公路), is an expressway in Yunnan, China that connects the cities of Baoshan to Lushui. The expressway has a total length of 85.17 km (52.92 mi) and was opened to traffic on 30 December 2020.
