= G5616 Anxiang–Jishou Expressway =

Road in China

Anxiang–Jishou Expressway
- 安乡－吉首高速公路
- Anji Expressway 安吉高速公路

Route information
- Auxiliary route of G56

Major junctions
- West end: G65 in Jishou, Xiangxi Tujia and Miao Autonomous Prefecture, Hunan
- East end: G56 in Anxiang County, Changde, Hunan

Location
- Country: China

Highway system
- National Trunk Highway System; Primary; Auxiliary; National Highways; Transport in China
← G5615	→ G5617

The G5616 Anxiang–Jishou Expressway (Chinese: 安乡—吉首高速公路), also referred to as the Anji Expressway (Chinese: 安吉高速公路), is an expressway in Hunan, China that connects Anxiang to Jishou.

== Route ==
The expressway starts in Anxiang, passes through Shimen, Cili, Zhangjiajie and Yongshun, before terminating in Jishou. The entire route is located in Hunan and it was fully opened to traffic on 31 December 2021.
