= China National Highway 111 =

Road in China

National Highway 111
- 111国道

Route information
- Length: 2,123 km (1,319 mi)

Major junctions
- From: Beijing
- To: Mohe, Heilongjiang

Location
- Country: China

Highway system
- National Trunk Highway System; Primary; Auxiliary
← G110	→ G112

China National Highway 111 runs from Beijing to Mohe of Heilongjiang province.

It leaves Beijing heading north-east. In November 2019, an expansion to the northernmost town in China, Mohe (Walagan), was completed.

== Route and distance ==
Route and distance

City	Distance (km)
Beijing, Beijing	0
Huairou, Beijing	49
Fengning, Hebei	192
Weichang, Hebei	382
Wangfu, Inner Mongolia	469
Chifeng, Inner Mongolia	525
Aohan Banner, Inner Mongolia	635
Naiman Banner, Inner Mongolia	748
Tongliao, Inner Mongolia	921
Horqin Right Middle Banner, Inner Mongolia	1161
Tuquan, Inner Mongolia	1202
Ulan Hot, Inner Mongolia	1316
Jalaid Banner, Inner Mongolia	1431
Zhalantun, Inner Mongolia	1623
Arun Banner, Inner Mongolia	1692
Morin Dawa Banner, Inner Mongolia	1835
Jiagedaqi, (disputed) (Note: (de jure Inner Mongolia, de facto Heilongjiang))	2123
Tahe, Heilongjiang	
Mohe, Heilongjiang	

== See also ==
- China National Highways
