= G1221 Yanji–Changchun Expressway =

Expressway in Jilin, China

Yanji–Changchun Expressway
- 延吉－长春高速公路
- Yanchang Expressway 延长高速

Major junctions
- East end: Yanji, Jilin
- West end: Changchun, Jilin

Location
- Country: China

Highway system
- National Trunk Highway System; Primary; Auxiliary; National Highways; Transport in China
← G1216	→ G15

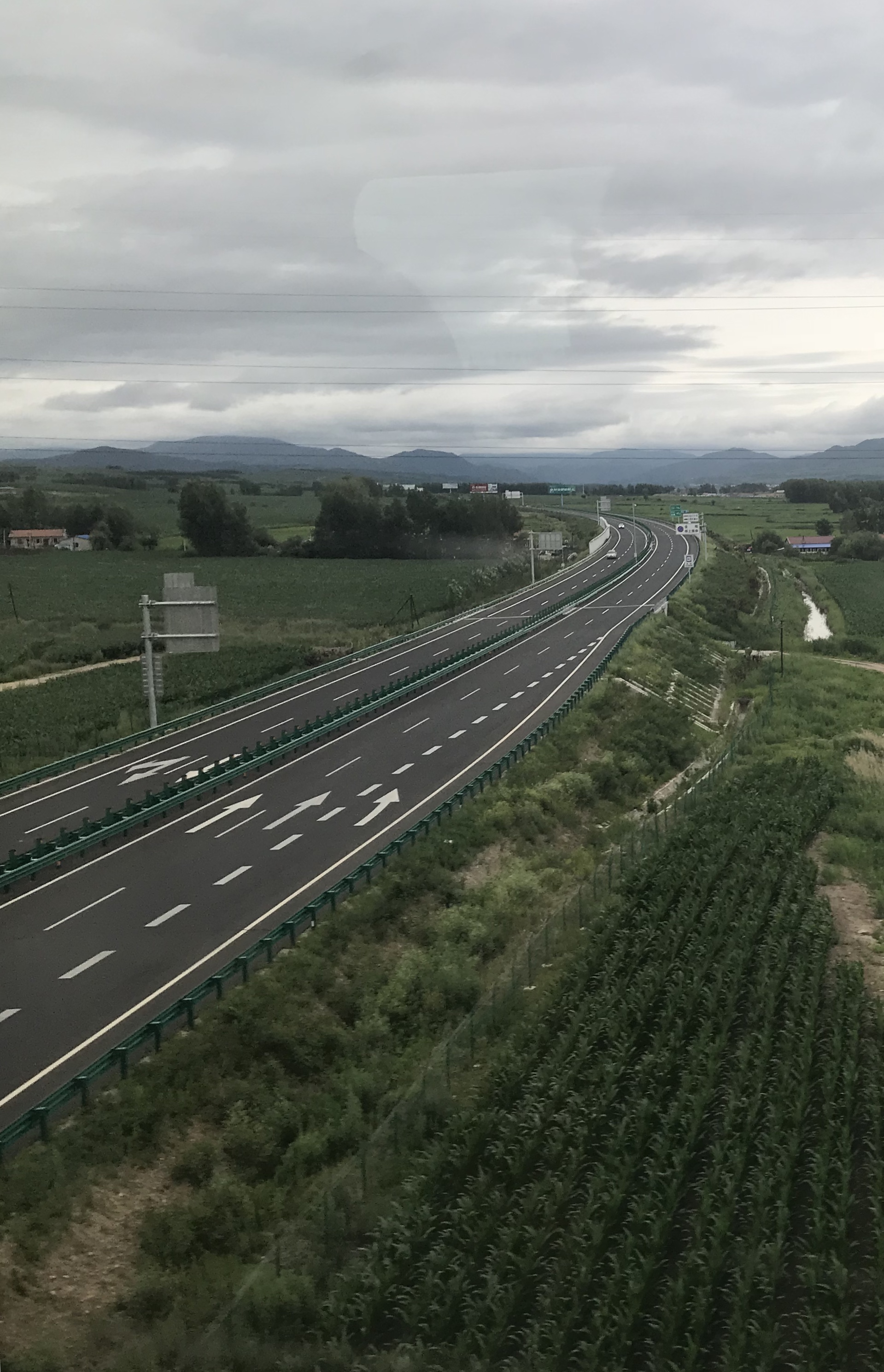
The Yanchang Expressway in July 2018

The Yanji-Changchun Expressway (simplified Chinese: 延吉－长春高速公路; traditional Chinese: 延吉－長春高速公路), designated as G1221 and commonly abbreviated as Yanchang Expressway (Chinese: 延长高速), is an expressway in Jilin, Northeast China linking the cities of Yanbian and Changchun, Jilin.

== Detailed Itinerary ==
East to West
Currently named S1116 Wangda Expressway
Currently named S1116 Wangda Expressway	G12 Hunwu Expressway
Currently named S1116 Wangda Expressway	Under Construction
Currently named S1116 Wangda Expressway	Yanshan Rd. Yanji West Railway Station
Currently named S1116 Wangda Expressway	S202 Road; Longjing-Toudao
Currently named S1116 Wangda Expressway	S1118 Songchang Expressway (To be Renamed G1215 Songchang Expressway)
	G11 Heda Expressway
Currently named S22 Dake Expressway
Currently named S22 Dake Expressway	G1212 Shenji Expressway
Currently named S22 Dake Expressway	S96 Changchun Area Ring Expressway
Currently named S22 Dake Expressway	Changchun Metropolitan Area
Currently named S22 Dake Expressway	G2501 Changchun Ring Expressway
West to East
