= G1213 Bei'an–Mohe Expressway =

Expressway in China

Bei'an–Mohe Expressway
- 北安－漠河高速公路
- Beimo Expressway 北漠高速公路

Major junctions
- North end: Mohe, Heilongjiang
- South end: Bei'an, Heilongjiang

Location
- Country: China

Highway system
- National Trunk Highway System; Primary; Auxiliary; National Highways; Transport in China
← G1212	→ G1215

The Bei'an–Mohe Expressway (Chinese: 北安－漠河高速公路), designated as G1213 and commonly abbreviated as Yancheng Expressway (Chinese: 北漠高速), is an expressway in Heilongjiang, Northeast China linking the cities of Bei'an and Mohe, Heilongjiang. The highway is a branch of G12 Hunchun–Ulanhot Expressway.

== Detailed Itinerary ==
North to South
Under Construction
Continues as S303 Road
222	S303 Road; Wudalianchi
Wudalianchi Service Area
	G1211 Jihei Expressway; S12 Qiannen Expressway; S15 Beisiu Expressway
South to North
