= S17 Baicheng Ring Expressway =

Road in Jilin, China

Baicheng Ring Expressway
- Baitao Expressway 白洮高速

Route information
- Auxiliary route of G12
- Length: 51.3 km (31.9 mi)

Major junctions
- Orbital around Baicheng, Jilin

Location
- Country: China
- Province: Jilin

Highway system
- Transport in China
| ← S16 | → S96 |

The Baicheng Ring Expressway (Chinese: 白城绕城高速), designated as S17 is an expressway in Northwestern Chinese province of Jilin going around the city of Baicheng. This expressway is a branch of G12 Hunwu Expressway.

== Detailed Itinerary ==
Counterclockwise
| G12 Hunwu Expressway; G4512 Shuannen Expressway |
Concurrent with G4512 Shuannen Expressway
| Lijiang Rd. Baicheng-Centre |
Concurrent with G4512 Shuannen Expressway
| G4512 Shuannen Expressway |
| S207 Road; Dongfeng; Baicheng-Centre |
| G302 Road; Baicheng-Centre |
| G12 Hunwu Expressway |
Concurrent with G12 Hunwu Expressway
Under Construction
| S207 Road; Baicheng-Centre |
| G302 Road; Baicheng-Centre |
Concurrent with G12 Hunwu Expressway
| G12 Hunwu Expressway; G4512 Shuannen Expressway |
Clockwise
