= China National Highway 203 =

Road in China

National Highway 203
- 203国道

Route information
- Length: 720 km (450 mi)

Major junctions
- From: Suihua in Heilongjiang
- To: Shenyang in Liaoning

Location
- Country: China

Highway system
- National Trunk Highway System; Primary; Auxiliary
← G202	→ G204

China National Highway 203 (G203) runs from Suihua in Heilongjiang to Shenyang in Liaoning. It is 720 kilometres in length and runs straight south from Mingshui, going via Songyuan.

== Route and distance ==
Route and distance

City	Distance (km)
Mingshui, Heilongjiang	0
Anda, Heilongjiang	107
Zhaozhou County, Heilongjiang	188
Zhaoyuan, Heilongjiang	218
Songyuan, Jilin	271
Qian Gorlos, Jilin	279
Changling, Jilin	403
Kangping, Liaoning	605
Faku, Liaoning	632
Shenyang, Liaoning	720

== See also ==
- China National Highways
