= G1211 Jilin–Heihe Expressway =

Road in China

Jilin–Heihe Expressway
- 吉林－黑河高速公路
- Jihei Expressway 吉黑高速公路

Route information
- Auxiliary route of G12
- Part of AH31

Major junctions
- South end: Jilin City, Jilin
- North end: Heihe, Heilongjiang

Location
- Country: China

Highway system
- National Trunk Highway System; Primary; Auxiliary; National Highways; Transport in China
| ← G12 | → G1212 |

The Jilin–Heihe Expressway (Chinese: 吉林—黑河高速公路), designated as G1211 and commonly referred to as the Jihei Expressway (Chinese: 吉黑高速公路), is a planned expressway that will connect the cities of Jilin City, Jilin, China, and Heihe, Heilongjiang. Heihe is on the China–Russia border. However, there is no road bridge over the Amur River, which forms the border between the two countries, and a road connection is only available on the frozen river during the winter.

The expressway is a spur of G12 Hunchun–Ulanhot Expressway.

== Detailed Itinerary ==
From North to South
Under Construction
Continues as G202 Road
| Dawusili |
Concurrent with G202 Road
Heihe Toll Station
| X231 Road; Towards S311 Road; Aihui |
Concurrent with G202 Road
| G202 Road; X178 Road; X179 Road; Xigangzi |
Caojitun Service Area
| U-Turn |
| G202 Road; Sunwu |
Sunwu Service Area
| G202 Road; Chenqing |
Xiaoxing'an Service Area
| G202 Road; Longmen |
| X180 Road; G202 Road; Zhanhe-Longzhen |
Longzhen Service Area
| G1213 Beimo Expressway; S12 Qiannen Expressway; S15 Beisiu Expressway |
Under Construction
| S16 Beiqi Expressway |
Heilongjiang Province; Jilin Province
Under Construction
Continues as S205 Road
| S205 Road; Ping'an |
| X036 Road; Towards S205 Road; Ping'an |
| S205 Road; Shuiquliu |
Continues as S205 Road
Under Construction
| G12 Hunwu Expressway; G1201 Jilin Ring Expressway |
From South to North
