= China National Highway 110 traffic jam =

Ten day long traffic obstruction

The China National Highway 110 traffic jam was a recurring traffic jam that began to form on 14 August 2010 on China National Highway 110 (G110) and the Beijing–Tibet expressway (G6) in Hebei and Inner Mongolia, mostly between Jining District, Ulanqab and Dongsheng District, Ordos. The traffic jam slowed thousands of vehicles for more than 100 kilometers (60 mi) and lasted for 12 days. Many drivers were able to move their vehicles only 1 km (0.6 mi) per day, and some drivers reported being stuck in the traffic jam for five days. It is considered to be the longest traffic jam in recorded history.

== Cause ==
Traffic on the China National Highway 110 had grown 40 percent every year, in the previous several years, making the highway chronically congested. The traffic volume at the time of the incident was 60% more than the design capacity.

The cause of the traffic jam was reported to be a spike in traffic by heavy trucks heading to Beijing, along with National Highway 110's maintenance work that began five days later. The road construction which reduced the road capacity by 50% contributed heavily to the traffic jam and was not due to be completed until mid-September. Police reported that minor breakdowns and accidents were compounding the problem.

Greatly increased coal production in Inner Mongolia was transported to Beijing along this route because of the lack of railway capacity, which overloaded the highway. 602 million tons of coal were mined and transported in 2009; production was expected to rise to 730 million tons in 2010. An additional factor is efforts by overloaded trucks that lacked proper paperwork for their cargo to avoid a coal quality supervision and inspection station on China National Highway 208.

== Effect and end ==
Locals near the highway sold various goods like water, instant noodles, and cigarettes at inflated prices to the stranded drivers. A bottle of water normally cost 1 yuan, but on the highway it was sold for 15 yuan. Drivers also complained that the price of instant noodles had more than tripled. Some vendors created mobile stores on bicycles.

Authorities tried to speed up traffic by allowing more trucks to enter Beijing, especially at night. They also asked trucking companies to suspend operations or take alternative routes.

By 26 August 2010, the traffic jam had largely dissipated, reportedly due to the efforts of authorities. Between Beijing and Inner Mongolia, only minor traffic slowdowns were reported near toll booths.
