= G11 Hegang–Dalian Expressway =

Expressway in China

Hegang–Dalian Expressway
- 鹤岗－大连高速公路
- Heda Expressway 鹤大高速公路

Route information
- Length: 1,390 km (860 mi) Length when complete.

Major junctions
- North end: Hegang, Heilongjiang
- South end: Lüshunkou District, Dalian, Liaoning

Location
- Country: China

Highway system
- National Trunk Highway System; Primary; Auxiliary; National Highways; Transport in China
← G1017	→ G1111

The Hegang–Dalian Expressway (Chinese: 鹤岗—大连高速公路), designated as G11 and commonly referred to as the Heda Expressway (Chinese: 鹤大高速公路) is an expressway that connects the cities of Hegang, Heilongjiang, China, and Dalian, Liaoning. When fully complete, it will be 1,390 km (860 mi) in length. The expressway runs parallel to G201 Road for all its length.

The expressway is mostly complete. However, the section that passes through central Jiamusi has not been built to expressway standards. Upon reaching Jiamusi, vehicles for Hegang have to exit the expressway and make an 11 km journey at a reduced speed before entering the final stretch of the expressway for Hegang. In response, a 25.837 km expressway section that links the two parts of the expressway is currently being built by the Jiamusi municipal government.

== Detailed Itinerary ==
From North to South
	G201 Road; Hegang
Hegang Toll Station
	Towards G201 Road; Heli
	G201 Road; Ping'an
	G201 Road; Jiamusi-Centre
	Chang'an W Road; Jiamusi-Centre
	Shengli W Road; Jiamusi-South
Jiamusi Toll Station
	AH33 G1011 Hatong Expressway
Caomao Service Area
	G201 Road; Mingyi
Gonghehu Service Area
	G201 Road; Huanan-North
	Xinxing W Road; Towards G201 Road; Towards S307 Road; Huanan
Yimashan Service Area
	X606 Road; Towards Qitaihe
	S20 Qiyi Expressway; S308 Road; Qitaihe-Centre
	G201 Road; Xingnong
	S11 Jianji Expressway; S206 Road; Jixi
Service Area
	G201 Road; S309 Road; Mashan
	X069 Road; Towards: G201 Road; S203 Road; S309 Road; Linkou
Linkou Service Area
	X066 Road; Towards G201 Road; Liushu
Chaihe Service Area
Mudanjiang Urban Area
	G201 Road; Hualin
	G201 Road; G301 Road; Mudanjiang-Centre
435 (146)	G10 Suiman Expressway
Concurrent with G10 Suiman Expressway
450 (161 A-B)	G10 Suiman Expressway; Bamiantong St; Towards G201 Road; Mudanjiang-Centre
	G201 Road; Wenchun
Mudanjiang Urban Area
	G201 Road; Ning'an
	G201 Road; Dongjingcheng
Bohai Service Area
	X066 Road; Towards G201 Road; Towards Mahe
	G201 Road; Jingbo
Jingbo Service Area
Fuxing Toll Station
	G201 Road
Continues as G201 Road
Under Construction
Heilongjiang Province; Jilin Province
	G201 Road; Yanminghu
Service Area
	G12 Hunwu Expressway
	G302 Road; Dunhua
	G201 Road; Jiangyuan (Gangyŏn)
Service Area
	G201 Road; S103 Road; Dapuchaihe (Daepochaeha)
	S22 Dake Expressway (To be Renamed G12S Yanchang Expressway); S1116 Wangda Expressway (To be Renamed G12S Yanchang Expressway)
	G201 Road; Yanjiang
	G201 Road; Lushuihe
Service Area
	G201 Road; X097 Road; Beigang-Quanyang
	G201 Road; Fusong
Under Construction
	S26 Fuchang Expressway
Concurrent with S26 Fuchang Expressway
(61)	S302 Road; Huayuankou
(74)	X089 Road; Towards S302 Road; Yanping
Concurrent with S26 Fuchang Expressway
(84)	S26 Fuchang Expressway
Under Construction
	Baishan
Service Area
	Xingling
	Guanghua
Service Area
Under Construction
	G303 Road; Ermi-Tonghua
	Tongde Road; Towards G201 Road; Towards S303 Road; Tonghua County
	S10 Tongshen Expressway
Duling Service Area
	G201 Road; Daquanyuan
Jilin Province; Liaoning Province
Guaimozi Toll Station
	G201 Road; X504 Road; Gucheng
	S13 Yonghuan Expressway; G201 Road
Yunfengshan Service Area
	G201 Road; Yahe
	X567 Road; Xiangyang
	G201 Road; Pulebao
Niumaowu Service Area
	G201 Road; Niumaowu
	G201 Road; Dachuantou
	G201 Road; S202 Road; Kuandian
Kuandian Service Area
	G201 Road; Qingyishan
	G201 Road; Maodianzi
	G201 Road; Towards Dongtang
Dandong Metropolitan Area
	G201 Road Wulong Mountain Scenic Area
	Dansun Line; Hamatang
1184	AH1 G1113 Danfu Expressway
Dandong Metropolitan Area
1196	AH1Yalu River Bridge Connection Line; Dandong-West; Towards New Yalu River Bridge; Towards (North Korea) AH1 Pyongyang-Sinuiju Motorway; Sinuiju
1218	G201 Road; Donggang
1233	Towards G201 Road; Beijingzi-Majiadian
1260	S312 Road; Gushan-Xiaodianzi
1261	G16 Daxi Expressway
Dagushan Service Area
1276	Towards G201 Road; Lizifang-Huayuan
1293	Towards G201 Road; Anzishan-Qingdui
1308	G201 Road; Wulu-Heidao
1319	S202 Road; Toward G201 Road; Zhuanghe
Zhuanghe Service Area
1324	G305 Road; Zhuanghe
1329 A-B	S19 Zhuanggai Expressway; G201 Road; Zhuanghe-West
1344	G201 Road; Dazheng
1353	G201 Road; Huayuankou Economic Area
1357	G201 Road; Mingyang-Chengshan
1370	G201 Road; Wafangdian-Chengzitan
Pikou Service Area
1388	Towards G201 Road; Pikou-Anbo
1392	S12 Pichang Expressway; G201 Road; Pikou
1397	Xinxing Road; Towards G201 Road; Pulandian-Yangshufang
1411	Daliujia-Xingshutun
1421	Dengshahe
1434	Desheng-Liangjiadian
1440	Huanghai Ave; Jinzhou-East
1450	S23 Dayaowan Port Expressway; Jinzhou-Centre
1456	Wuyi Road; Dongbei Street; Jinzhou-Centre Line 7 7号线 Tostem Station
1460	Dalianwan Port
Dandong Metropolitan Area
1467 A-B	AH31 G15 Shenhai Expressway
Dalian Toll Station
Service Area
	G201 Road; G202 Road
Continues as Huabei Road; Dalian-Centre
From South to North
