= China National Highway 303 =

Road in China

National Highway 303
- 303国道

Route information
- Length: 1,263 km (785 mi)

Major junctions
- From: Ji'an, Jilin
- To: Xilinhot, Inner Mongolia

Location
- Country: China

Highway system
- National Trunk Highway System; Primary; Auxiliary
← G302	→ G304

China National Highway 303 (G303) runs from Ji'an, Jilin to Xilinhot, Inner Mongolia. It is 1,263 kilometres in length and runs northwest from Ji'an through Jilin and Liaoning and ends in Inner Mongolia.

== Route and distance ==
Route and distance

City	Distance (km)
Ji'an, Jilin	0
Tonghua, Jilin	100
Liuhe County, Jilin	200
Meihekou, Jilin	230
Dongfeng County, Jilin	253
Liaoyuan, Jilin	299
Dongliao, Jilin	306
Pinggang, Liaoning	333
Tiande, Liaoning	351
Border of Jilin	376
Siping, Jilin	385
Bamiancheng, Liaoning	
Fujia Town, Liaoning	
Sanjiangkou, Liaoning	
Shuangliao, Jilin	478
Tongliao, Inner Mongolia	597
Kailu, Inner Mongolia	690
Ar Horqin Banner, Inner Mongolia	805
Bairin Left Banner, Inner Mongolia	870
Bairin Right Banner, Inner Mongolia	956
Linxi County, Inner Mongolia	1017
Hexigten Qi, Inner Mongolia	1082
Xilinhot, Inner Mongolia	1263

== See also ==
- China National Highways
