= AH32 =

International Highway route in Asia

Asian Highway 32

Route information
- Length: 3,748 km (2,329 mi)

Major junctions
- East end: Sonbong, North Korea
- West end: Khovd, Mongolia

Location
- Countries: North Korea, China, Mongolia

Highway system
- Asian Highway Network
← AH31	→ AH33

Asian Highway 32 or AH32 is a route running 3,748 kilometres (2,329 mi) from Sonbong in North Korea to Khovd in Mongolia via China. The partial route in China is considered as potential Asian highway as per map.

== North Korea ==
60 km (37 mi).

- 7 Sonbong – Hayŏp'yŏng ( AH6 )
- 94 Hayŏp'yŏng - Wonjong - China border

== China ==
- S201: Quanhe - Hunchun
- G12: Hunchun - Changchun - Ulanhot (SE.)
- Ulanhot SW. Ring Expressway: Southern Ulanhot
- G302: Ulanhot (SW.) - Haerbagang Tuowula
- S203: Haerbagang Tuowula - Arxan
- X912: Arxan - Arxan Port

== Mongolia ==
2,520 km (1,570 mi)

- Sümber – Choibalsan
- A0502 : Choibalsan - Öndörkhaan
- A0501 : Öndörkhaan - Nalaikh ( AH3 ) - Ulaanbaatar ( AH3 )
- A0301 : Ulaanbaatar - Khashaat
- A0601 : Khashaat - Kharkhorin
- A0602 : Kharkhorin - Tsetserleg
- A0603 : Tsetserleg - Tosontsengel
- A1102 : Tosontsengel - Uliastai
- A12 : Uliastai - Myangad
- A1701 : Myangad - Khovd ( AH4 )

== Junctions ==
North Korea
AH 6 Sonbong
China
AH31 Changchun
Mongolia
AH3 Ulaanbaatar
AH4 Khovd

== See also ==
- List of Asian Highways
- International E-road network
- Trans-African Highway network
