= G4512 Shuangliao–Nenjiang Expressway =

Expressway in Jilin and Heilongjiang provinces of China

Shuangliao–Nenjiang Expressway
- 双辽－嫩江高速公路

Major junctions
- North end: Nenjiang City, Heilongjiang
- South end: Shuangliao, Jilin

Location
- Country: China

Highway system
- National Trunk Highway System; Primary; Auxiliary; National Highways; Transport in China
| ← G4511 | → G4513 |

The Shuangliao–Nenjiang Expressway (Chinese: 双辽–嫩江高速公路), designated as G4512 and commonly referred to as the Shuangnen Expressway (Chinese: 双嫩高速公路), is a partially completed expressway in China. It is a major north–south expressway that when complete, will connect the cities of Nenjiang City, in Heilongjiang, with Shuangliao, in Jilin, near the border with Inner Mongolia.

== History ==
This expressway has formerly been wrongly signed using the NTHS-like code "G47."
