= G1501 Shenyang Ring Expressway =

Expressway in Shenyang, China

Shenyang Ring Expressway
- 沈阳绕城高速公路
- 沈阳绕城高速
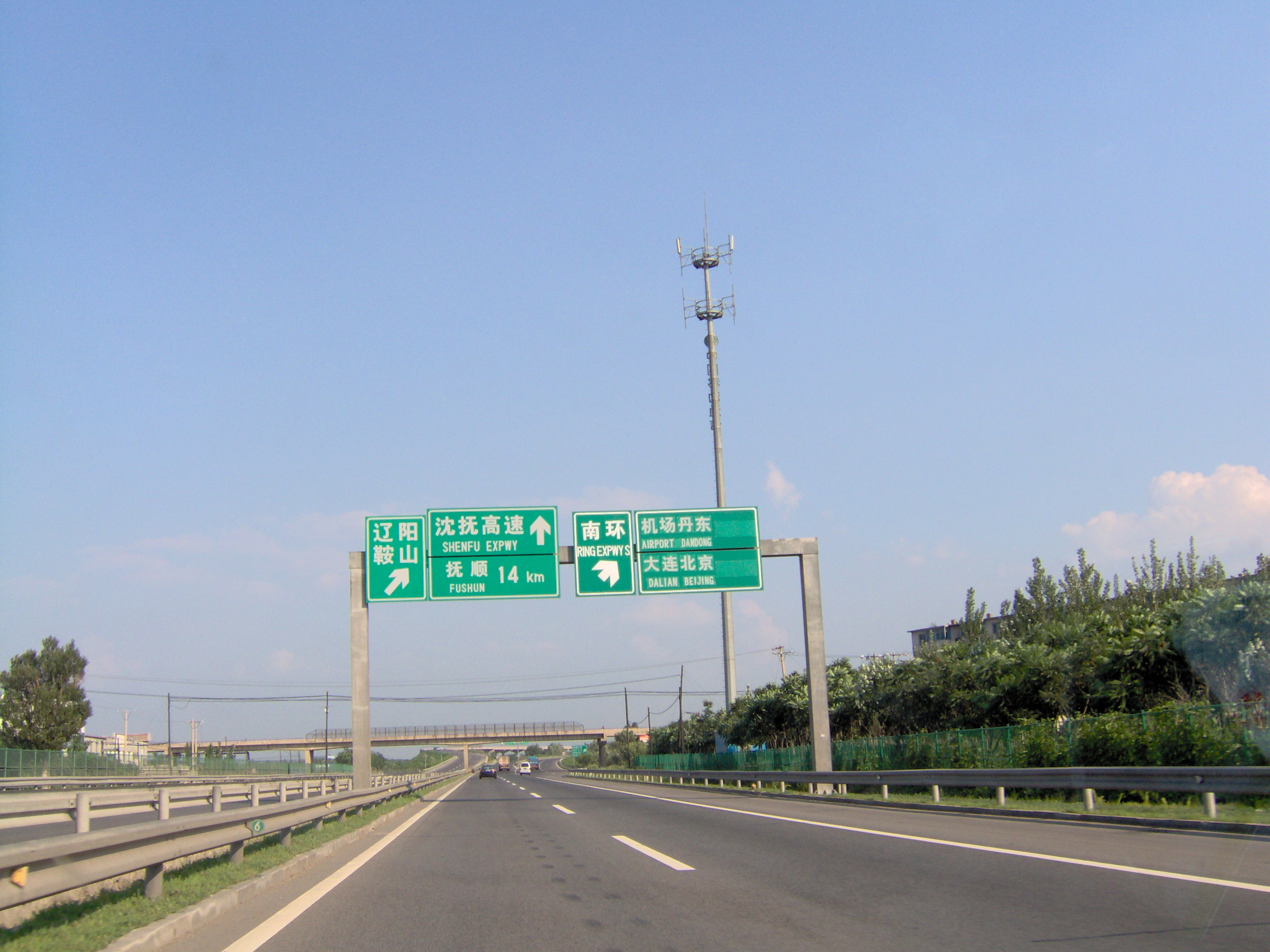
- Shenyang Ring Expressway in June 2006

Route information
- Length: 82 km (51 mi)
- Existed: 1995–present

Location
- Country: China

Highway system
- National Trunk Highway System; Primary; Auxiliary; National Highways; Transport in China
← G15	→ G1503

The Shenyang Ring Expressway (Chinese: 沈阳绕城高速公路), designated as G1501, is a ring expressway in Shenyang, Liaoning, China.

== History ==
Construction of the Shenyang Ring Expressway started in 1988, and the whole ring was completed and opened to traffic in September 1995. It was built as a part of the planned G1 Beijing-Harbin Expressway, with a total length of 82.051 kilometers. In 2010, the Liaoning Provincial Department of Communications launched the reconstruction and expansion project of the Shenyang Ring Expressway, which was completed at the end of July 2013.

== Toll ==
Starting 31 July 2013, the Shenyang Ring Expressway has implemented the vehicle toll-free policy for Shenyang-registered small passenger cars. This only applies if the vehicle enters from the toll stations of the Shenyang Ring Expressway and exit at the Shenyang Ring Expressway toll stations. If the vehicle travels beyond the Shenyang Ring Expressway, the vehicle toll will be paid according to the actual mileage traveled. According to the regulations of the Liaoning Provincial Department of Communications, small passenger vehicles that enjoy the toll exemption policy must be equipped with ETC electronic tags, and must pass through the ETC dedicated lane when driving at the Shenyang Ring Expressway toll station. From the initial period of free implementation to 31 March 2014, vehicles that met the conditions but had not yet installed electronic tags were allowed to pass through the Shenyang Ring Expressway.

Since 1 January 2020, the upgraded networked toll collection system was implemented which was launched on expressways across the country. However, Liaotong card prepaid card customers of small passenger cars with less than 9 seats (including 9 seats) from Shenyang still continue to enjoy the toll-free policy of the Shenyang Ring Expressway. The only difference is that the ETC lane entrance can only be passed normally when the balance on the card is greater than 0 yuan.
