= Naiman Banner =

Naiman Banner 奈曼旗 • ᠨᠠᠢᠮᠠᠨ ᠬᠣᠰᠢᠭᠤ
- Banner
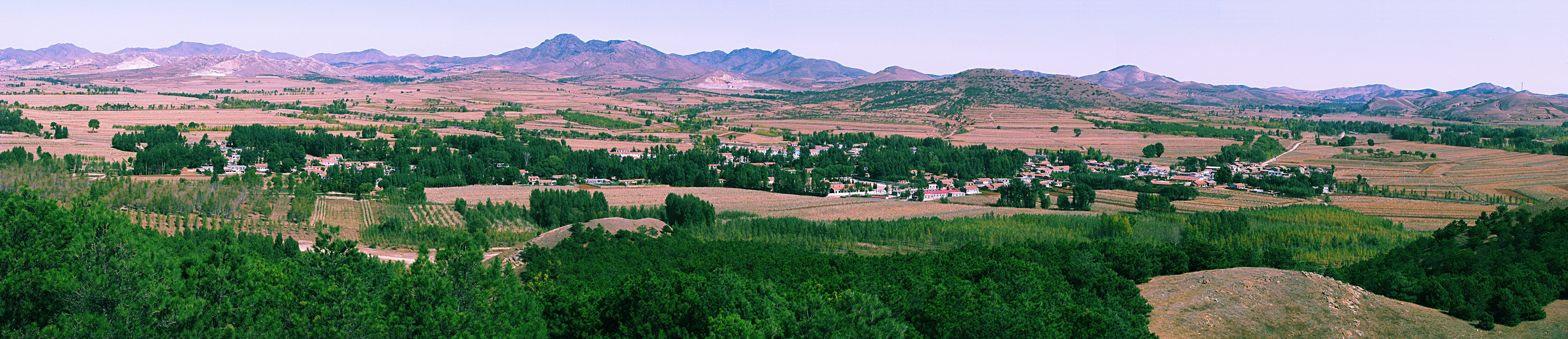
- Nanwanzi, Naiman

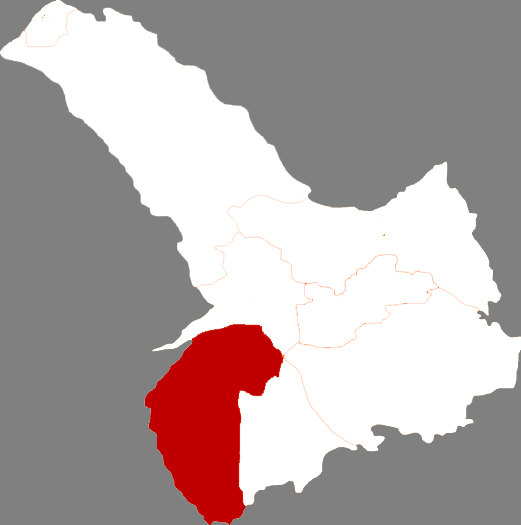
- Naiman Banner in Tongliao

- Tongliao in Inner Mongolia

- Location of the seat in Inner Mongolia Naiman (China)
- Coordinates: 42°51′N 120°40′E
- Country: China
- Autonomous region: Inner Mongolia
- Prefecture-level city: Tongliao
- Banner seat: Daqin Tal Town

Area
  - Total: 8,124 km^{2} (3,137 sq mi)
- Elevation: 372 m (1,220 ft)

Population (2020)
  - Total: 375,312
  - Density: 46.20/km^{2} (119.7/sq mi)
- Time zone: UTC+8 (China Standard)
- Website: www.naimanqi.gov.cn

Naiman Banner

Chinese name
- Chinese: 奈曼旗
Transcriptions
Standard Mandarin
- Hanyu Pinyin: Nàimàn Qí

Mongolian name
- Mongolian Cyrillic: Найман хошуу
- Mongolian script: ᠨᠠᠢᠮᠠᠨ ᠬᠣᠰᠢᠭᠤ
Transcriptions
- SASM/GNC: Naiman qosiɣu

Naiman Banner (Mongolian: ᠨᠠᠢᠮᠠᠨ ᠬᠣᠰᠢᠭᠤ; Chinese: 奈曼旗) is a banner of Inner Mongolia, China. It is under the administration of Tongliao City, 156 kilometres (97 mi) to the northeast, and lies on China National Highway 111.

== Demographics ==
The proportion of nationalities in Naiman Banner (2020)
Nationality	Percentage
Han	60.7%
Mongols	37.5%
Manchus	1.6%
Others	0.2%
Source of the population statistics :

== Administrative divisions ==
Naiman Banner is made up of 1 subdistrict, 8 towns, 2 townships, and 4 sums.

Name	Simplified Chinese	Hanyu Pinyin	Mongolian (Hudum Script)	Mongolian (Cyrillic)	Administrative division code
Subdistrict
Daqin Tal Subdistrict	大沁他拉街道	Dàqìntālā Jiēdào	ᠳᠠᠴᠢᠨᠲᠠᠯ᠎ᠠ ᠵᠡᠭᠡᠯᠢ ᠭᠤᠳᠤᠮᠵᠢ	Дайчин Тал гудамж	150525401
Towns
Daqin Tal Town	大沁他拉镇	Dàqìntālā Zhèn	ᠳᠠᠴᠢᠨᠲᠠᠯ᠎ᠠ ᠪᠠᠯᠭᠠᠰᠤ	Дайчин Тал балгас	150525100
Baixingt Town	八仙筒镇	Bāxiāntǒng Zhèn	ᠪᠠᠢᠰᠢᠩᠲᠤ ᠪᠠᠯᠭᠠᠰᠤ	Байшинт балгас	150525101
Qinglongshan Town	青龙山镇	Qīnglóngshān Zhèn	ᠴᠢᠩ ᠯᠦᠩ ᠱᠠᠨ ᠪᠠᠯᠭᠠᠰᠤ	Чин лүн шин балгас	150525102
Xinzhen Town	新镇	Xīn Zhèn	ᠰᠢᠨ ᠵᠧᠨ ᠪᠠᠯᠭᠠᠰᠤ (ᠰᠢᠨ᠎ᠡ ᠪᠠᠯᠭᠠᠰᠤ)	Шин жен балгас (Шинэ балгас)	150525103
Zhi'an Town	治安镇	Zhì'ān Zhèn	ᡁᠢ ᠠᠨ ᠪᠠᠯᠭᠠᠰᠤ	Зии аан балгас	150525104
Dongming Town	东明镇	Dōngmíng Zhèn	ᠳ᠋ᠥᠩ ᠮᠢᠩ ᠪᠠᠯᠭᠠᠰᠤ	Дүн мин балгас	150525105
Xar Holoi Town	沙日浩来镇	Shārìhàolái Zhèn	ᠰᠢᠷᠠᠬᠣᠭᠣᠯᠠᠢ ᠪᠠᠯᠭᠠᠰᠤ	Шархоолой балгас	150525106
Yilongyong Town	义隆永镇	Yìlóngyǒng Zhèn	ᠢ ᠯᠦᠩ ᠶᠦᠩ ᠪᠠᠯᠭᠠᠰᠤ	И лүн юн балгас	150525107
Townships
Tuchengzi Township	土城子乡	Tǔchéngzǐ Xiāng	ᠲᠦᠴᠧᠩᠽᠢ ᠰᠢᠶᠠᠩ	Дөчэнз шиян	150525204
Ulias Township	苇莲苏乡	Wěiliánsū Xiāng	ᠤᠯᠢᠶᠠᠰᠤ ᠰᠢᠶᠠᠩ	Улиас шиян	150525205
Sums
Gurban Hua Sum	固日班花苏木	Gùrìbānhuā Sūmù	ᠭᠤᠷᠪᠠᠨᠬᠤᠸᠠ ᠰᠤᠮᠤ	Гурванхуа сум	150525200
Bayan Tal Sum	白音他拉苏木	Báiyīntālā Sūmù	ᠪᠠᠶᠠᠨᠲᠠᠯ᠎ᠠ ᠰᠤᠮᠤ	Баянтал сум	150525201
Mingren Sum	明仁苏木	Míngrén Sūmù	ᠮᠢᠩ ᠿᠧᠨ ᠰᠤᠮᠤ	Мин ен сум	150525202
Honghor Tal Sum	黄花塔拉苏木	Huánghuātǎlā Sūmù	ᠬᠣᠩᠬᠣᠷᠲᠠᠯ᠎ᠠ ᠰᠤᠮᠤ	Хонгор тал сум	150525203

- Other: State-owned No. 6 Farm (国有六号农场)

== Climate ==
Climate data for Naiman Banner, elevation 363 m (1,191 ft), (1991–2020 normals, extremes 1981–2010)
Month	Jan	Feb	Mar	Apr	May	Jun	Jul	Aug	Sep	Oct	Nov	Dec	Year
Record high °C (°F)	10.3 (50.5)	21.0 (69.8)	28.6 (83.5)	32.9 (91.2)	39.0 (102.2)	39.5 (103.1)	40.3 (104.5)	37.8 (100.0)	34.6 (94.3)	29.8 (85.6)	23.8 (74.8)	14.5 (58.1)	40.3 (104.5)
Mean daily maximum °C (°F)	−5.3 (22.5)	−0.4 (31.3)	7.1 (44.8)	16.6 (61.9)	23.8 (74.8)	28.0 (82.4)	29.8 (85.6)	28.5 (83.3)	23.8 (74.8)	15.4 (59.7)	4.2 (39.6)	−3.7 (25.3)	14.0 (57.2)
Daily mean °C (°F)	−11.7 (10.9)	−7.3 (18.9)	0.3 (32.5)	9.8 (49.6)	17.3 (63.1)	21.9 (71.4)	24.3 (75.7)	22.8 (73.0)	17.0 (62.6)	8.5 (47.3)	−1.9 (28.6)	−9.8 (14.4)	7.6 (45.7)
Mean daily minimum °C (°F)	−16.5 (2.3)	−12.8 (9.0)	−5.7 (21.7)	3.3 (37.9)	10.7 (51.3)	16.1 (61.0)	19.4 (66.9)	17.5 (63.5)	10.9 (51.6)	2.6 (36.7)	−6.8 (19.8)	−14.3 (6.3)	2.0 (35.7)
Record low °C (°F)	−30.2 (−22.4)	−24.6 (−12.3)	−22.4 (−8.3)	−8.7 (16.3)	0.5 (32.9)	5.4 (41.7)	12.4 (54.3)	6.1 (43.0)	0.5 (32.9)	−11.1 (12.0)	−20.6 (−5.1)	−24.8 (−12.6)	−30.2 (−22.4)
Average precipitation mm (inches)	1.5 (0.06)	2.2 (0.09)	6.5 (0.26)	14.8 (0.58)	37.2 (1.46)	66.5 (2.62)	103.8 (4.09)	60.4 (2.38)	31.3 (1.23)	15.9 (0.63)	7.1 (0.28)	2.1 (0.08)	349.3 (13.76)
Average precipitation days (≥ 0.1 mm)	1.9	2.0	2.8	4.3	7.7	10.5	11.5	8.5	6.2	4.1	2.9	2.0	64.4
Average snowy days	3.2	2.9	3.6	1.9	0.1	0	0	0	0	1.2	4.0	3.7	20.6
Average relative humidity (%)	51	44	40	37	42	57	68	68	58	50	50	53	52
Mean monthly sunshine hours	223.0	226.5	269.5	260.6	283.0	258.2	240.8	259.2	258.2	247.0	207.2	207.5	2,940.7
Percentage possible sunshine	76	76	72	65	62	56	52	61	70	73	72	74	67
Source: China Meteorological Administration

Climate data for Qinglongshan Town, Naiman Banner, elevation 400 m (1,300 ft), (1991–2020 normals)
Month	Jan	Feb	Mar	Apr	May	Jun	Jul	Aug	Sep	Oct	Nov	Dec	Year
Mean daily maximum °C (°F)	−5.3 (22.5)	−0.7 (30.7)	6.7 (44.1)	16.0 (60.8)	23.0 (73.4)	26.8 (80.2)	28.3 (82.9)	27.3 (81.1)	23.1 (73.6)	14.9 (58.8)	4.0 (39.2)	−3.7 (25.3)	13.4 (56.1)
Daily mean °C (°F)	−11.5 (11.3)	−7.3 (18.9)	0.0 (32.0)	9.1 (48.4)	16.4 (61.5)	20.8 (69.4)	23.1 (73.6)	21.6 (70.9)	16.2 (61.2)	8.1 (46.6)	−2.2 (28.0)	−9.7 (14.5)	7.1 (44.7)
Mean daily minimum °C (°F)	−16.5 (2.3)	−13.2 (8.2)	−6.4 (20.5)	2.3 (36.1)	9.5 (49.1)	15.0 (59.0)	18.3 (64.9)	16.6 (61.9)	9.7 (49.5)	1.8 (35.2)	−7.6 (18.3)	−14.7 (5.5)	1.2 (34.2)
Average precipitation mm (inches)	1.5 (0.06)	2.5 (0.10)	7.4 (0.29)	17.5 (0.69)	52.3 (2.06)	84.8 (3.34)	131.6 (5.18)	91.3 (3.59)	37.1 (1.46)	21.0 (0.83)	7.4 (0.29)	2.2 (0.09)	456.6 (17.98)
Average precipitation days (≥ 0.1 mm)	1.7	1.9	3.1	4.7	8.0	11.1	12.5	9.6	6.2	4.4	2.8	2.0	68
Average snowy days	2.7	2.9	3.0	1.7	0	0	0	0	0	1.0	3.1	3.1	17.5
Average relative humidity (%)	50	45	42	40	47	63	76	76	64	54	53	54	55
Mean monthly sunshine hours	222.6	228.2	267.4	256.2	276.9	237.9	209.9	232.1	241.4	237.3	200.4	203.4	2,813.7
Percentage possible sunshine	76	76	72	64	61	52	46	55	65	70	69	72	65
Source: China Meteorological Administration

== See also ==
- Naimans
