= Longnan, Jiangxi =

Longnan 龙南市 Lungnan
- County-level city
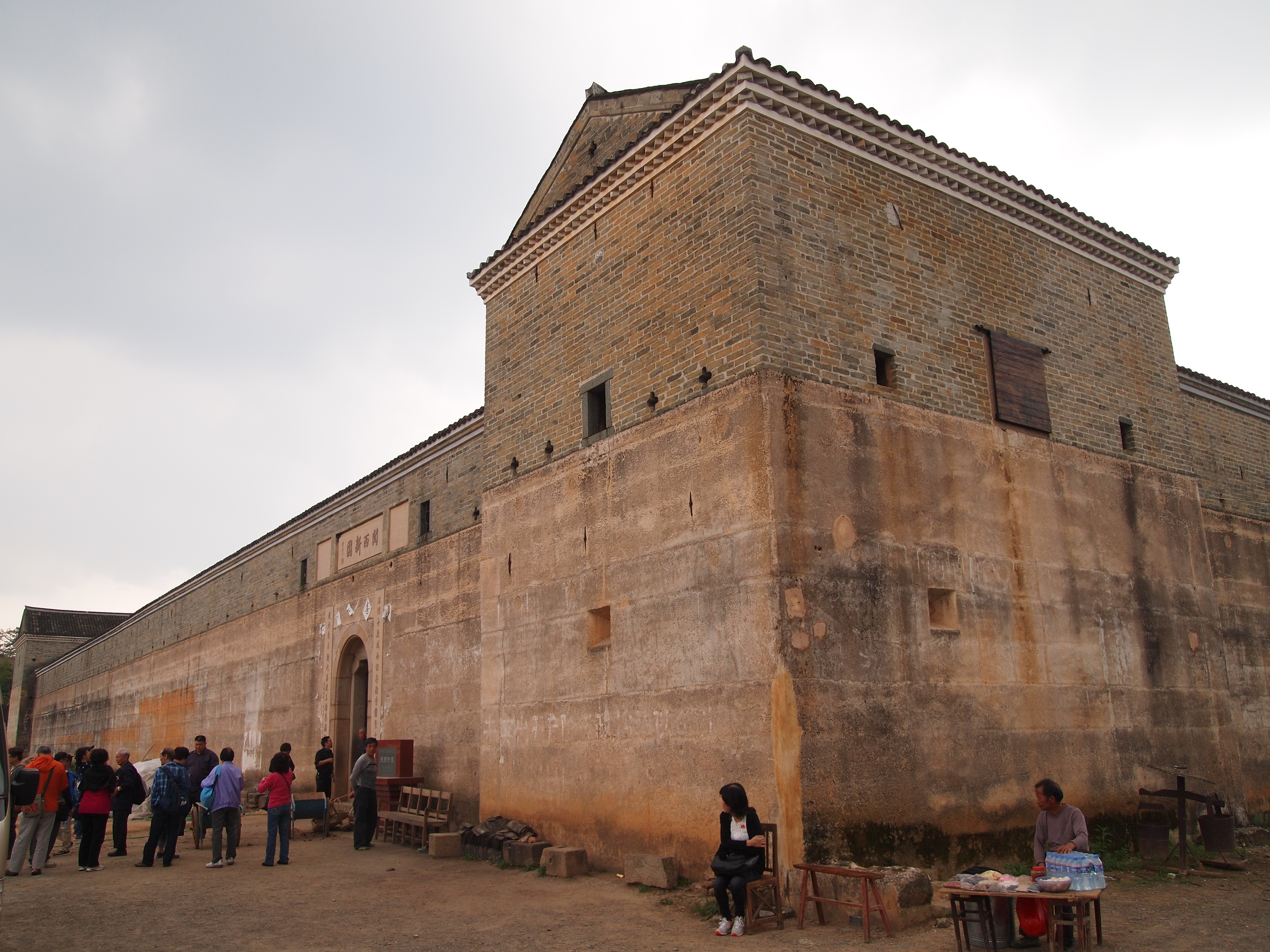
- Guanxi Xinwei, a Hakka walled village

- Location within Jiangxi
- Coordinates: 25.9106°N 114.786°E
- Country: People's Republic of China
- Province: Jiangxi
- Prefecture-level city: Ganzhou
- Postal Code: 341700

Longnan (simplified Chinese: 龙南; traditional Chinese: 龍南; pinyin: Lóngnán) is a county-level city under the jurisdiction of Ganzhou Municipality, in the far southwest of Jiangxi province, China, bordering Guangdong province to the south.

== Administrative divisions ==
In the present, Longnan City has 8 towns and 5 townships.

8 towns

- Longnan (龙南镇)
- Wudang (武当镇)
- Yangcun (杨村镇)
- Wenlong (汶龙镇)
- Chenglong (程龙镇)
- Guanxi (关西镇)
- Liren (里仁镇)
- Dujiang (渡江镇)

5 townships

- Taojiang (桃江乡)
- Dongjiang (东江乡)
- Lintang (临塘乡)
- Nanxiang (南享乡)
- Jiahu (夹湖乡)

== Traditional architecture ==
Longnan is notable for the variety of traditional Hakka walled villages in Jiangxi. By one count, there are around 370 of them within the city's boundaries. They are known locally as weiwu (围屋) or wei (围).

Longnan is also regarded as "the Hometown of Weiwu in China" 新华网-客家围屋之乡. Some of the most famous weiwu are Guangxi Wei 百度百科-关西围屋 and Yanyiwei.关西围屋与燕翼围 Some researchers call them "Jiangxi tulou" (literally, "[tall] earthen buildings"), as opposed to the better known Fujian tulou.

== Climate ==
Climate data for Longnan, elevation 250 m (820 ft), (1991–2020 normals, extremes 1981–2010)
Month	Jan	Feb	Mar	Apr	May	Jun	Jul	Aug	Sep	Oct	Nov	Dec	Year
Record high °C (°F)	27.4 (81.3)	30.7 (87.3)	32.0 (89.6)	34.0 (93.2)	35.7 (96.3)	37.8 (100.0)	39.0 (102.2)	39.0 (102.2)	37.0 (98.6)	35.1 (95.2)	34.2 (93.6)	28.5 (83.3)	39.0 (102.2)
Mean daily maximum °C (°F)	14.3 (57.7)	16.8 (62.2)	19.7 (67.5)	25.1 (77.2)	28.8 (83.8)	31.4 (88.5)	33.7 (92.7)	33.2 (91.8)	30.4 (86.7)	26.6 (79.9)	21.8 (71.2)	16.3 (61.3)	24.8 (76.7)
Daily mean °C (°F)	9.1 (48.4)	11.5 (52.7)	14.8 (58.6)	20.1 (68.2)	24.0 (75.2)	26.5 (79.7)	28.1 (82.6)	27.6 (81.7)	25.2 (77.4)	21.0 (69.8)	16.0 (60.8)	10.6 (51.1)	19.5 (67.2)
Mean daily minimum °C (°F)	5.7 (42.3)	8.0 (46.4)	11.6 (52.9)	16.7 (62.1)	20.6 (69.1)	23.3 (73.9)	24.2 (75.6)	24.0 (75.2)	21.8 (71.2)	17.1 (62.8)	11.9 (53.4)	6.7 (44.1)	16.0 (60.7)
Record low °C (°F)	−4.1 (24.6)	−2.1 (28.2)	−1.9 (28.6)	4.7 (40.5)	11.0 (51.8)	15.0 (59.0)	19.2 (66.6)	19.3 (66.7)	12.6 (54.7)	4.7 (40.5)	−1.5 (29.3)	−5.4 (22.3)	−5.4 (22.3)
Average precipitation mm (inches)	67.2 (2.65)	84.8 (3.34)	174.2 (6.86)	194.5 (7.66)	225.4 (8.87)	238.7 (9.40)	140.0 (5.51)	171.6 (6.76)	98.9 (3.89)	36.1 (1.42)	46.9 (1.85)	47.9 (1.89)	1,526.2 (60.1)
Average precipitation days (≥ 0.1 mm)	9.6	11.4	17.3	16.4	17.4	17.9	14.5	15.5	10.4	5.1	7.1	7.5	150.1
Average snowy days	0.5	0.3	0	0	0	0	0	0	0	0	0	0.3	1.1
Average relative humidity (%)	76	78	82	81	82	83	78	80	79	74	75	73	78
Mean monthly sunshine hours	93.1	83.1	73.7	93.1	119.2	140.1	214.9	191.9	162.1	163.2	138.3	128.1	1,600.8
Percentage possible sunshine	28	26	20	24	29	34	52	48	44	46	43	39	36
Source: China Meteorological Administration

== Famous people from Longnan ==
- Wang Sheng, a Kuomintang general, and in his later life, Taiwan's ambassador to Paraguay
