= List of auxiliary NTHS expressways =

National Trunk Highway System
- NTHS expressway marker

- NTHS expressway in China

System information
- Formed: 13 January 2005; 21 years ago

Highway names
- NTHS: GXXXX (green)

System links
- National Trunk Highway System; Primary; Auxiliary

This is a combined list of the spur (联络线), parallel (并行线), metropolitan area ring (都市圈环线) and city ring (城市环线) routes of National Trunk Highway System expressways of China. Auxiliary expressways are followed by two additional digits of their primary expressway and the GXX0X series routes are city beltways. Generally, odd-numbered routes have lower numbers in the east and higher numbers in the west; even-numbered routes have lower numbers in the north and higher numbers in the south.

Before 2017, those codes were followed by a cardinal point (N, S, E, W) and an additional digit if repeated starting with 2; associated auxiliary expressways were followed by two additional digits, but during the 13th National People's Congress in 2017, the SAC published a new recommendation national standard GB/T 917-2017, in this standard document, all auxiliary routes are ruled only having two additional digits, and therefore all parallel routes and most of city ring routes are having their codes changed.

China contains large groups of areas that are sparsely populated; expressways in these areas are therefore usually not designated principals, except when connecting provincial capitals with Beijing (G6, G7) or part of the Eurasian Land Bridge (G30, also the more practical route for Xinjiang to connect with Central and Southern China). However, in plans for 2035 all prefecture-level capitals and an absolute majority of counties must connect to the NTHS network, even in those remote areas, resulting in extremely long branch expressways (spur routes) of the NTHS, including but not limited to G0611, G0612, G0613, G0615, G1013, G1816, G5511. They likely will exceed 1,000 (2,000 for G0612 and G0613) km when completed, while the longest branch Interstate does not exceed 250 km. The G4218 is estimated at 4,000 km and will be the longest spur route in the world when completed.

In this list under number column, the gray colored routes are not yet completed. The routes are officially printed in the 2022 National Highway Network Plan.

== Spur expressways ==
Number	Name	Chinese name	Origin	Terminus	Length	Formed	Notes
G0111	Qinbin Expressway	秦滨高速	Qinhuangdao, HE	Zhanhua, Binzhou, SD	387 km (240 mi)	2021	Added in 71118, was S31. Should not be confused with G111
G0112	Changliao Expressway	长辽高速	Changchun, JL	Liaoyuan, JL		2022	Added in 2022 plan
G0211	Jinshi Expressway	津石高速	Tianjin, TJ	Shijiazhuang, HE	258.8 km (160.8 mi)	2022	Added in 71118
G0212	Wubin Expressway	武滨高速	Wuqing, TJ	Binhai, TJ		1993	Added in 2022 plan, was S40
G0311	Jiliao Expressway	济聊高速	Jinan, SD	Liaocheng, SD	147 km (91 mi)	2020	Added in 2022 plan, former portion of S1
G0411	Anchang Expressway	安长高速	Anyang, HA	Changzhi, SX		2018	Added in 2022 plan (was G2212 in provincial plan)
G0412	Shennan Expressway	深南高速	Shenzhen, GD	Nanning, GX			Added in 2022 plan
G0413	Xinxin Expressway	新忻高速	Xinle, HE	Xinzhou, SX			Added in 2022 plan
G0511	Dedu Expressway	德都高速	Deyang, SC	Dujiangyan, SC	89.6 km (55.7 mi)	2021	Added in 71118
G0512	Chengle Expressway	成乐高速	Chengdu, SC	Leshan, SC	89 km (55 mi)	2021 (except Chengdu–Pengshan)	Added in 71118, was S7 until 2017
G0513	Pingluo Expressway	平洛高速	Pingyao, SX	Luoyang, HA		2020 (Qinshui–Luoyang)	Added in 2022 plan
G0611	Zhangwen Expressway	张汶高速	Zhangye, GS	Wenchuan, SC	1,100 km (680 mi)(estimate)	2022 (Zhangye–Tongren)	Added in 71118; was S88 and S92
G0612	Xihe Expressway	西和高速	Xining, QH	Hotan, XJ	2,400 km (1,500 mi)(estimate)	2022 (except Huangyuan–Ulan)	Added in 71118; was S2011
G0613	Xili Expressway	西丽高速	Xining, QH	Lijiang, YN	2,300 km (1,400 mi)(estimate)	2021 (except Yushu–Shangri'La)	Added in 71118
G0615	Dekang Expressway	德康高速	Delingha, QH	Kangding, SC	1,300 km (810 mi) (before extension)	2024	Added in 71118 and extended in 2022 plan; was S24, S87 and S2014
G0616	Wugan Expressway	乌甘高速	Urad Front Banner, NM	port of Ganqimaodu, NM			Added in 2022 plan, connects to roads in Mongolia via Ganqimaodu Port; was S39
G0711	Wuruo Expressway	乌若高速	Ürümqi, XJ	Ruoqiang, XJ	754 km (469 mi)	2026	Added in 71118
G0712	Ece Expressway	额策高速	Ejin Banner, NM	port of Ceke, NM			Added in 2022 plan, connects to roads in Mongolia via Ceke Port
G1011	Hatong Expressway	哈同高速	Harbin, HL	Tongjiang, HL	566 km (352 mi)	2011	AH33
G1012	Jianhei Expressway	建黑高速	Jiansanjiang, HL	Heixiazi Island, HL	217 km (135 mi)	2016	Added in 71118, connects to roads via Heixiazi Port (Russia); was S14 until 2017
G1013	Haizhang Expressway	海张高速	Hailar, NM	Zhangjiakou, HE	1,500 km (930 mi)(estimate)	2014 (Xilinhot–Zhangjiakou)	Added in 71118; was S20, S21 and S27
G1015	Tieke Expressway	铁科高速	Tieli, HL	Horqin Right Middle Banner, NM	900 km (560 mi)(estimate)	2020 (Yushu–Tongyu)	Added in 71118; was S13, S14 and S22
G1016	Shuangbao Expressway	双宝高速	Shuangyashan, HL	Baoqing, HL			Added in 2022 plan
G1017	Haijia Expressway	海加高速	Hailar, NM	Jiagedaqi, HL			Added in 2022 plan
G1111	Heha Expressway	鹤哈高速	Hegang, HL	Harbin, HL	457 km (284 mi)	2011 (except Hegang–Yichun)	
G1112	Jishuang Expressway	集双高速	port of Ji'an, JL	Shuangliao, JL	350 km (220 mi)(estimate)	2021	Connects to roads in North Korea via Ji'an Port.
G1113	Danfu Expressway	丹阜高速	port of Dandong, LN	Fuxin, LN	450 km (280 mi)(estimate)	2007 (except Xinmin–Fuxin)	part of AH1 (between Dandong and Shenyang); Connects to Pyongyang–Sinuiju Motorway in North Korea via New Yalu River Bridge Port.
G1115	Jijian Expressway	鸡建高速	Jixi, HL	Jiansanjiang, HL		2016	Added in 2022 plan; was S11
G1116	Yibei Expressway	伊北高速	Yichun, HL	Bei'an, HL		2013	Added in 2022 plan
G1117	Suibei Expressway	绥北高速	Suihua, HL	Bei'an, HL		2016	Added in 2022 plan
G1118	Fuchang Expressway	抚长高速	Fusong, JL	port of Changbai, JL		2016 (except Changbai Airport–Changbai Port)	Added in 2022 plan, connects to roads in North Korea via Changbai Port.
G1119	Bailin Expressway	白临高速	Baishan, JL	port of Linjiang, JL		2016 (a little section in Baishan)	Added in 2022 plan, connects to roads in North Korea via Linjiang Port.
G1131	Muyan Expressway	牡延高速	Xingshan, Mudanjiang, HL	Yanji, JL		2016 (Wangqing–Yanji)	Added in 2022 plan
G1211	Jihei Expressway	吉黑高速	Jilin, JL	port of Heihe, HL	900 km (560 mi)(estimate)	2018 (except Shulan–Harbin (south) and Harbin (north)–Bei'an)	part of AH31 (between Heihe and Harbin); Connects to R461 and R468 highways in Russia via Heihe Port.
G1212	Shenji Expressway	沈吉高速	Shenyang, LN	Jilin, JL	372 km (231 mi)	2011	
G1213	Beimo Expressway	北漠高速	Bei'an, HL	Mohe, HL	750 km (470 mi)(estimate)	2011 (Bei'an–Wudalianchi)	Added in 71118, was a part of S12
G1215	Songchang Expressway	松长高速	Songjiang, Antu, JL	Changbai Mountain, JL			Added in 71118
G1216	Wu'a Expressway	乌阿高速	Ulanhot, NM	Alide'er, Horqin RFB, NM	78 km (48 mi)		part of AH32; Added in 71118
G1511	Rilan Expressway	日兰高速	Rizhao, SD	Lankao, HA		2002	
G1512	Yongjin Expressway	甬金高速	Ningbo, ZJ	Jinhua, ZJ	185 km (115 mi)	2005	
G1513	Wenli Expressway	温丽高速	Wenzhou, ZJ	Lishui, ZJ	116 km (72 mi)	2012	
G1514	Ningshang Expressway	宁上高速	Ningde, FJ	Shangrao, JX	353.366 km (219.571 mi)	2012	
G1515	Yanjing Expressway	盐靖高速	Yancheng, JS	Jingjiang, JS	168.62 km (104.78 mi)	2008	Added in 71118; was S29
G1516	Yanluo Expressway	盐洛高速	Dafeng, Yancheng, JS	Luoyang, HA		2023	Added in 71118; was S4, S6, S9 and S18
G1517	Puyan Expressway	莆炎高速	Meizhou Bay, Putian, FJ	Yanling, HN	706 km (439 mi)	2022	Added in 71118, was S1512, S2511, S2526 and S50
G1518	Yanbeng Expressway	盐蚌高速	Yancheng, JS	Bengbu, AH		2022 (Jinhu–Xuyi, Wuhe–Bengbu)	Added in 2022 plan
G1519	Tongru Expressway	通如高速	Nantong, JS	Rudong, JS		2022	Added in 2022 plan; was S15
G1531	Huci Expressway	沪慈高速	Shanghai, SH	Cixi, ZJ			Added in 2022 plan
G1532	Quanmei Expressway	泉梅高速	Quanzhou port, Quanzhou, FJ	Meizhou, GD		2013	Added in 2022 plan
G1533	Quanjin Expressway	泉金高速	Quanzhou, FJ	Jinmen, FJ (de jure)			Added in 2022 plan
G1534	Xiajin Expressway	厦金高速	Xiamen, FJ	Jinmen, FJ (de jure)			Added in 2022 plan
G1535	Chaonan Expressway	潮南高速	Chaozhou, GD	Nanchang, JX		2019 (Meizhou–Pingyuan)	Added in 2022 plan
G1536	Guanguang Expressway	莞广高速	Dongguan, GD	Guangzhou, GD			Added in 2022 plan
G1611	Kecheng Expressway	克承高速	Hexigten, NM	Chengde, HE		2023	Added in 71118; was S17
G1612	Xi'er Expressway	锡二高速	Xilinhot, NM	Erenhot, NM			Added in 2022 plan; was S20
G1811	Huangshi Expressway	黄石高速	Huanghua, HE	Shijiazhuang, HE	281.54 km (174.94 mi)	2000	
G1812	Cangyu Expressway	沧榆高速	Cangzhou, HE	Yulin, SN	550.13 km (341.83 mi)	2011	Added in 71118, was S68
G1813	Weiqing Expressway	威青高速	Weihai, SD	Jimo, Qingdao, SD	250 km (160 mi)	2014	Added in 71118; was S24
G1815	Weiri Expressway	潍日高速	Weifang, SD	Rizhao, SD	184.65 km (114.74 mi)	2020	Added in 71118; was S23
G1816	Wuma Expressway	乌玛高速	Wuhai, NM	Maqên, QH		2016 (except Wuhai–Shizuishan (but some sections near Qipanjing is completed), and Hezuo–Maqên)	Added in 71118; was S47
G1817	Wuyin Expressway	乌银高速	Wuhai, NM	Yinchuan, NX		2020 (except Bayin Hutuge–Alxa Left Banner)	Added in 71118; was S33
G1818	Binde Expressway	滨德高速	Binzhou, SD	Dezhou, SD	143.8 km (89.4 mi)	2012	Added in 2022 plan; was S12
G2011	Qingxin Expressway	青新高速	Qingdao, SD	Xinhe, Pingdu, SD	109 km (68 mi)	2007	
G2012	Dingwu Expressway	定武高速	Dingbian, SN	Wuwei, GS		2013	
G2211	Changyan Expressway	长延高速	Licheng, Changzhi, SX	Yan'an, SN	418.67 km (260.15 mi)	2024	Added in 71118, should not be confused with G1221
G2511	Xinlu Expressway	新鲁高速	Xinmin, LN	Lubei, Jarud, NM	281 km (175 mi)	2017	
G2512	Fujin Expressway	阜锦高速	Fuxin, LN	Jinzhou, LN	117.23 km (72.84 mi)	2002	
G2513	Huaixu Expressway	淮徐高速	Huai'an, JS	Xuzhou, JS	222 km (138 mi)	2005	
G2515	Luhuo Expressway	鲁霍高速	Lubei, Jarud, NM	Holingol, NM			Added in 71118
G2516	Donglü Expressway	东吕高速	Kenli, Dongying, SD	Fenyang, Lüliang, SX	546.228 km (339.410 mi)	2030	Added in 71118, was S78 and S80
G2517	Shaxia Expressway	沙厦高速	Shaxian, FJ	Xiamen, FJ	243 km (151 mi)	2017	Added in 71118, was S30
G2518	Shencen Expressway	深岑高速	Shenzhen, GD	Cenxi, GX		2024	Added in 71118; was S50
G2519	Kangshen Expressway	康沈高速	Kangping, LN	Shenyang, LN	92.2 km (57.3 mi)	2021	Added in 2022 plan; was S2
G2531	Hangshang Expressway	杭上高速	Hangzhou, ZJ	Shangrao, JX			Added in 2022 plan
G3011	Liuge Expressway	柳格高速	Liuyuan, GS	Golmud, QH	650 km (400 mi)	2022	
G3012	Tuhe Expressway	吐和高速	Turpan, XJ	Hotan, XJ	1,931 km (1,200 mi)	2019	part of AH4 (between Toksun and Kashgar)
G3013	Ayi Expressway	阿伊高速	Artux, XJ	port of Erkeshtam, XJ	97 km (60 mi)	2013	part of AH61 and AH65; Connects to A371 highway in Kyrgyzstan via Erkeshtam Port, shortened in 2022 plan.
G3014	Kui'a Expressway	奎阿高速	Kuytun, XJ	Altay, XJ	563 km (350 mi)	2014	part of AH67 (between Kuytun and Karamay)
G3015	Kuita Expressway	奎塔高速	Kuytun, XJ	Baketu port, Tacheng, XJ	245 km (152 mi)	2014	Connects to A356 highway in Kazakhstan via Baketu Port.
G3016	Qingyi Expressway	清伊高速	Qingshuihe, Huocheng, XJ	Yining, XJ	53 km (33 mi)	2009	
G3017	Wujin Expressway	武金高速	Wuwei, GS	Jinchang, GS		2010	Added in 71118
G3018	Jing'a Expressway	精阿高速	Jinghe, XJ	port of Alashankou, XJ	78 km (48 mi)	2022	part of AH68; Added in 71118, connects to A355 highway in Kazakhstan via Alashankou Port.
G3019	Bo'a Expressway	博阿高速	Bole, XJ	port of Alashankou, XJ	73 km (45 mi)		Added in 71118, connects to A355 highway in Kazakhstan via Alashankou Port.
G3031	Shanggu Expressway	商固高速	Shangqiu, HA	Gushi, HA		2019 (except Tiancheng-Huaibin)	Added in 2022 plan
G3032	Yonghai Expressway	永海高速	Yongdeng, GS	Haiyan, QH			Added in 2022 plan
G3033	Kuiku Expressway	奎库高速	Kuytun, XJ	Kuqa, XJ			Added in 2022 plan
G3035	Yixin Expressway	伊新高速	Yining, XJ	Xinyuan, XJ		2019	Added in 2022 plan, was S12
G3036	Aa Expressway	阿阿高速	Aksu, XJ	Aral, XJ			Added in 2022 plan
G3511	Hebao Expressway	菏宝高速	Heze, SD	Fengxiang, Baoji, SN	872.2 km (542.0 mi)	2023	Added in 71118; was S28, S32, and S88
G3512	Xungan Expressway	寻赣高速	Xunwu, JX	Ganzhou, JX			Added in 2022 plan
G3611	Ningxin Expressway	宁信高速	Nanjing, JS	Xinyang, HA		2018 (except Nanjing-Lai'an and Changfeng-Huaibin)	Added in 2022 plan
G3612	Pingyi Expressway	平宜高速	Pingdingshan, HA	Yichang, HB		2005 (Fangcheng-Xiangyang)	Added in 2022 plan
G3613	Luonei Expressway	洛内高速	Luoyang, HA	Neixiang, HA		2012 (except Luanchuan-Neixiang)	Added in 2022 plan
G3615	Luolu Expressway	洛卢高速	Luoyang, HA	Lushi, HA		2012	Added in 2022 plan; was S92
G4011	Yangli Expressway	扬溧高速	Yangzhou, JS	Liyang, JS		2012	
G4012	Lining Expressway	溧宁高速	Liyang, JS	Fu'an, Ningde, FJ		2023	Added in 71118; was S1, S1511, S48 and S51
G4013	Yangyue Expressway	扬乐高速	Yangzhou, JS	Yueqing, ZJ		2022 (except Danyang-Jintan and Tonglu-Yiwu)	Added in 2022 plan
G4015	Danning Expressway	丹宁高速	Danfeng, SN	Ningshan, SN		2021 (Shanyang-Zhashui)	Added in 2022 plan
G4211	Ningwu Expressway	宁芜高速	Nanjing, JS	Wuhu, AH		2005	
G4212	He'an Expressway	合安高速	Hefei, AH	Anqing, AH		2002	
G4213	Ma'an Expressway	麻安高速	Macheng, HB	Ankang, SN	665 km (413 mi)	2022	Added in 71118; was S28
G4215	Rongzun Expressway	蓉遵高速	Chengdu, SC	Zunyi, GZ		2014	Added in 71118; was S4
G4216	Rongli Expressway	蓉丽高速	Chengdu, SC	Lijiang, YN	895 km (556 mi)	2022 (except Muchuan–Huidong)	Added in 71118; was S59
G4217	Chengchang Expressway	蓉昌高速	Chengdu, SC	Chamdo, XZ		2021 (except Barkam–Chamdo)	Added in 71118; was S9 and S36
G4218	Yaye Expressway	雅叶高速	Ya'an, SC	Kargilik, XJ	1,543 km (959 mi)(without Nyingchi-Xinduqiao and Shigatse-Yecheng sections); 4,000 km (2,500 mi)(said sections included, estimate)	2021 (Ya'an–Kangding; Nyingchi–Lhasa(East); Lhasa(West)–Qüxü; Shigatse Peace Airport–Shigatse Center)	Added in 71118
G4219	Qunai Expressway	曲乃高速	Qüxü, XZ	Nêdong, XZ		2017	Added in 71118
G4231	Ningjiu Expressway	宁九高速	Nanjing, JS	Jiujiang, JX		2010 (Pengze-Jiujiang)	Added in 2022 plan
G4511	Longhe Expressway	龙河高速	Longnan, JX	Heyuan, GD	127.45 km (79.19 mi)	2005	
G4512	Shuangnen Expressway	双嫩高速	Shuangliao, JL	Nenjiang, HL	714.203 km (443.785 mi)	2020	Added in 71118; was S19 and S47, some signs were wrongly numbered G47 in Jilin
G4513	Naiying Expressway	奈营高速	Naiman, NM	Yingkou, LN	300.705 km (186.849 mi)	2013 (except Fuxingdi–Fuxin)	Added in 71118; was S13 and S21
G4515	Chisui Expressway	赤绥高速	Chifeng, NM	Suizhong, LN	176 km (109 mi)	2023	Added in 71118
G5011	Wuhe Expressway	芜合高速	Wuhu, AH	Hefei, AH	110 km (68 mi)	2000	
G5012	Enguang Expressway	恩广高速	Lichuan, Enshi, HB	Guangyuan, SC		2017	Added in 71118; was S22
G5013	Yurong Expressway	渝蓉高速	Chongqing, CQ	Chengdu, SC		2017	Added in 71118; was S3
G5015	Wuyue Expressway	武岳高速	Wuhan, HB	Yueyang, HN		2009	Added in 2022 plan
G5016	Yihua Expressway	宜华高速	Yichang, HB	Huarong, HN		2016	Added in 2022 plan
G5511	Ji'a Expressway	集阿高速	Jining, NM	Arun, NM		2022 (Ulanhot–Arun)	
G5512	Jinxin Expressway	晋新高速	Jincheng, SX	Xinxiang, HA	138 km (86 mi)	2004	
G5513	Changzhang Expressway	长张高速	Changsha, HN	Zhangjiajie, HN	309.762 km (192.477 mi)	2005	
G5515	Zhangnan Expressway	张南高速	Zhangjiajie, HN	Nanchong, SC	590 km (370 mi)	2022 (except Sangzhi–Xianfeng)	Added in 71118; was S28
G5516	Suzhang Expressway	苏张高速	Sonid Right Banner, NM	Zhangjiakou, HE	335.6 km (208.5 mi)	2022	Added in 71118; was S42
G5517	Changchang North Route Expressway	长常北线高速	Changde, HN	Changsha, HN	50.787 km (31.558 mi)	2022 (Yiyang–Changsha)	Added in 2022 plan, was S28
G5518	Jintong Expressway	晋潼高速	Jincheng, SX	Tongguan, SN		2022 (Yuncheng–Yongji)	Added in 2022 plan
G5611	Dali Expressway	大丽高速	Dali, YN	Lijiang, YN		2013	
G5612	Dalin Expressway	大临高速	Dali, YN	Lincang, YN		2023 (except Nanjian-Yunxian)	Added in 71118
G5613	Baolu Expressway	保泸高速	Baoshan, YN	Lushui, YN		2021	Added in 71118
G5615	Tianhou Expressway	天猴高速	Tianbao port, Malipo, YN	Houqiao port, Tengchong, YN		2022 (except Tianbao–Malipo and Gasa–Zhenyuan)	Added in 71118, connects to in Vietnam via Tianbao Port, and roads in Myanmar via Houqiao Port.
G5616	Anji Expressway	安吉高速	Anxiang, HN	Jishou, HN		2021	Added in 2022 plan
G5617	Linmeng Expressway	临勐高速	Lincang, YN	Menghai, YN		2022 (Lincang-Shuangjiang)	Added in 2022 plan
G5618	Linqing Expressway	临清高速	Lincang, YN	Qingshuihe port, Gengma, YN		2021	Added in 2022 plan, connects to roads in Myanmar via Qingshuihe Port.
G5911	Shuotai Expressway	朔太高速	Shuozhou, SX	Taiyuan, SX		2012 (Xilingjing–Taiyuan)	Added in 2022 plan
G5912	Fangwu Expressway	房五高速	Fangxian, HB	Wufeng, JX			Added in 2022 plan
G6011	Nanshao Expressway	南韶高速	Nanchang, JX	Shaoguan, GD		2017	Added in 71118; was S59, S66 and S4503
G6012	Qumi Expressway	曲弥高速	Qujing, YN	Mile, YN		2020	Added in 2022 plan
G6511	Anqing Expressway	安清高速	Ansai, SN	Qingjian, SN		2020 (Zichang–Qingjian)	Added in 2022 plan
G6512	Xiucong Expressway	秀从高速	Xiushan, CQ	Congjiang, GZ		2016 (except Xinhuang–Tianzhu)	Added in 2022 plan
G6517	Wuliu Expressway	梧柳高速	Wuzhou, GX	Liuzhou, GX	212.55 km (132.07 mi)	2017	Added in 71118; was S19 (in province planning) and G6511 in GB/T 917-2013; later switched to G6517 because 11 is an unlucky number in Wuzhou dialect
G6911	Anlai Expressway	安来高速	Pingli, Ankang, SN	Laifeng, HB	446.26 km (277.29 mi)	2023	Added in 71118; was S11 and S73
G7011	Shitian Expressway	十天高速	Shiyan, HB	Tianshui, GS		2015	
G7012	Fuji Expressway	抚吉高速	Fuzhou, JX	Ji'an, JX		2012	Added in 2022 plan; was S46
G7013	Shanan Expressway	沙南高速	Shaxian, FJ	Nanping, FJ			Added in 2022 plan; was S20
G7211	Nanyou Expressway	南友高速	Nanning, GX	port of Youyiguan, GX		2005	part of AH1 connects to North–South Expressway East in Vietnam via Youyiguan Port.
G7212	Liubei Expressway	柳北高速	Liuzhou, GX	Beihai, GX		2017	Added in 71118
G7511	Qindong Expressway	钦东高速	Qinzhou, GX	port of Dongxing, GX	76.28 km (47.40 mi)	2013	connects to Haiphong–Ha Long–Van Don–Mong Cai Expressway in Vietnam via Dongxing Port
G7512	Zhurong Expressway	筑蓉高速	Guiyang, GZ	Chengdu, SC		2021 (except Guiyang–Gulin)	Added in 2022 plan
G7611	Duxiang Expressway	都香高速	Duyun, GZ	Shangri-La, YN		2022 (except Jinyang–Shangri'La)	Added in 71118, was S88 and S92
G7612	Naxing Expressway	纳兴高速	Nayong, GZ	Xingyi, GZ		2020 (except Nayong–Qinglong)	Added in 71118; was S65
G8011	Kaihe Expressway	开河高速	Kaiyuan, YN	port of Hekou, YN		2013	part of AH14; Connects to Hanoi–Lao Cai Expressway expressway in Vietnam via Hekou Port.
G8012	Michu Expressway	弥楚高速	Mile, YN	Chuxiong, YN		2022	Added in 71118
G8013	Yanwen Expressway	砚文高速	Yanshan, YN	Wenshan, YN		2017	Added in 71118
G8511	Kunmo Expressway	昆磨高速	Kunming, YN	port of Mohan, YN	692 km (430 mi)	2017	part of AH3; Connects to Route 13 in Laos via Mohan Port. Part of the Kunming-Bangkok Expressway via Laos and Thailand to Bangkok.
G8512	Jingda Expressway	景打高速	Jinghong, YN	Daluo port, Menghai, YN	54.229 km (33.696 mi)	2021 (Jinghong–Menghai)	part of AH3 branch Added in 71118, connects to roads in Myanmar via Daluo Port.
G8513	Pingmian Expressway	平绵高速	Pingliang, GS	Mianyang, SC		2022 (except Jiuzhaigou–Jiangyou)	Added in 71118; was S73
G8515	Guanglu Expressway	广泸高速	Guang'an, SC	Luzhou, SC		2020 (except Wusheng–Tongnan)	Added in 71118; was S33; multiplexed with G75 and G9909 Between Wusheng-Yongchuan
G8516	Barong Expressway	巴蓉高速	Bazhong, SC	Chengdu, SC	308 km (191 mi)	2012	Added in 2022 plan; was S2
G8517	Pingxing Expressway	屏兴高速	Xinshi, Pingshan, SC	Xingyi, GZ		2022 (except Pingshan–Yibin)	Added in 2022 plan
G9111	Benji Expressway	本集高速	Benxi, LN	Ji'an, JL		2022 (Jilin section)	Added in 71118; was S18
G9211	Yongzhou Expressway	甬舟高速	Ningbo, ZJ	Zhoushan, ZJ		2009	
G9411	Guanfo Expressway	莞佛高速	Dongguan, GD	Foshan, GD		2010	
G9511	Lailai Expressway	涞涞高速	Laishui, HE	Laiyuan, HE		2012	Added in 71118
G9811	Haile Expressway	海乐高速	Haikou, HI	Ledong, HI		2018	Added in 71118 and shortened in 2022 plan; was S21
G9812	Haiqiong Expressway	海琼高速	Haikou, HI	Qionghai, HI		2019	Added in 71118; was S11
G9813	Wanyang Expressway	万洋高速	Wanning, HI	Yangpu, HI		2019	Added in 71118; was S16

== Parallel expressways ==
Number	Name	Chinese name	Origin	Terminus	Length	Formed	Notes
G0121	Jingqin Expressway	京秦高速	Beijing, BJ	Qinhuangdao, HE		2023	Added in 71118, was G1N during 2013~2017 and S60 before that
G0122	Qinshen Expressway	秦沈高速	Qinhuangdao, HE	Shenyang, LN			Added in 2022 plan
G0321	Deshang Expressway	德上高速	Dezhou, SD	Shangrao, JX	947.381 km (588.675 mi)	2022	Added in 71118, was G3W during 2013~2017
G0322	Jingde Expressway	京德高速	Beijing, BJ	Dezhou, SD		2022 (Gu'an-Renqiu)	Added in 2022 plan
G0323	Jihe Expressway	济合高速	Jining, SD	Hefei, AH		2021 (Jining-Xuzhou, Guzhen-Bengbu)	Added in 2022 plan
G0421	Xuguang Expressway	许广高速	Xuchang, HA	Guangzhou, GD		2022	Added in 71118, was G4W2 during 2013~2017
G0422	Wushen Expressway	武深高速	Wuhan, HB	Shenzhen, GD		2018	Added in 71118, was G4E during 2013~2017
G0423	Leguang Expressway	乐广高速	Lechang, GD	Guangzhou, GD		2014	Added in 71118, was G4W3 during 2013~2017 and S1 before that
G0424	Jingwu Expressway	京武高速	Beijing, BJ	Wuhan, HB		2022 (Beijing-Xiong'an, Zhongmu-Zhengyang)	Added in 2022 plan
G0425	Guang'ao Expressway	广澳高速	Guangzhou, GD	port of Macau, MO		2018	Connects to Lotus Road via Hengqin Port and Cotai Frontier Post, was G4W during 2013~2017
G1221	Yanchang Expressway	延长高速	Yanji, JL	Changchun, JL		2020 (except Dapuchaihe-Changchun)	Added in 71118, was G12S during 2013~2017, should not be confused with G2211
G1521	Changjia Expressway	常嘉高速	Changshu, JS	Jiashan, ZJ		2020	Added in 71118, was G15W2 during 2013~2017 and S5 before that
G1522	Changtai Expressway	常台高速	Changshu, JS	Taizhou, ZJ	339 km (211 mi)	2013	Was G15W during 2013~2017
G1523	Yongguan Expressway	甬莞高速	Ningbo, ZJ	Dongguan, GD	1,835 km (1,140 mi)	2022	Added in 71118, was G15W3 during 2013~2017
G3021	Linxing Expressway	临兴高速	Lintong, SN	Xingping, SN		2015	Added in 71118, was G30N during 2013~2017
G4221	Huwu Expressway	沪武高速	Shanghai, SH	Wuhan, HB		2022 (except Wuwei-Lujiang)	Added in 71118, was G42S during 2013~2017
G4222	Hexiang Expressway	和襄高速	Hexian, AH	Xiangyang, HB			Added in 2022 plan
G4223	Wuyu Expressway	武渝高速	Wuhan, HB	Chongqing, CQ			Added in 2022 plan
G5021	Shiyu Expressway	石渝高速	Shizhu, CQ	Chongqing, CQ		2012	Added in 71118, was G50S during 2013~2017
G5621	Kunda Expressway	昆大高速	Kunming, YN	Dali, YN			Added in 2022 plan
G6021	Hangchang Expressway	杭长高速	Hangzhou, ZJ	Changsha, HN		2022	Added in 71118, was G60N during 2013~2017
G6022	Lilou Expressway	醴娄高速	Liling, HN	Loudi, HN		2024	Added in 2022 plan
G6023	Nanfeng Expressway	南凤高速	Nanchang, JX	Fenghuang, HN		2021	Added in 2022 plan
G6025	Dongsan Expressway	洞三高速	Dongkou, HN	Sansui, GZ		2015 (Tianzhu-Sansui)	Added in 2022 plan
G6521	Yulan Expressway	榆蓝高速	Yulin, SN	Yushan, Lantian, SN		2021	Added in 71118, was G65E during 2013~2017
G6522	Yanxi Expressway	延西高速	Yan'an, SN	Xi'an, SN	320 km (200 mi)	2016	Added in 2022 plan, was G65 while current G65 was G65W
G7021	Ningwu Expressway	宁武高速	Ningde, FJ	Wuhan, HB		2019 (except Ningde-Shunchang and Zhangshu-Yangxin)	Added in 2022 plan; was S10, S42 and S9
G7221	Hengnan Expressway	衡南高速	Hengyang, HN	Nanning, GX		2023	Added in 2022 plan
G7521	Yuzhu Expressway	渝筑高速	Chongqing, CQ	Guiyang, GZ		2022	Added in 2022 plan
G7522	Zhubei Expressway	筑北高速	Guiyang, GZ	Beihai, GX			Added in 2022 plan
G9221	Hangyong Expressway	杭甬高速	Hangzhou, ZJ	Ningbo, ZJ	161 km (100 mi)	2024 (except some sections in Ningbo)	Added in 71118, was S17 and S18 before 2013, G92N during 2013-2017, should not be confused with Hangzhou-Ningbo section of G92

== Metropolitan area ring expressways ==
All are added in 2022 plan.

Number	Name	Chinese name	Terminus	Length	Formed	Notes
G9901	Harbin Metropolitan Area Ring Expressway	哈尔滨都市圈环线高速	Encircles Shuangcheng, Songbei, Hulan and Acheng districts of Harbin, HL			
G9902	Changchun Metropolitan Area Ring Expressway	长春都市圈环线高速	Encircles Dehui, Jiutai, Shuangyang, Yitong, Gongzhuling and Nong'an of Jilin	376 km		Formerly Jilin S96
G9903	Hangzhou Metropolitan Area Ring Expressway	杭州都市圈环线高速	Encircles Deqing, Tongxiang, Haining, Shaoxing, Zhuji and Fuyang of Zhejiang	272 km		
G9904	Nanjing Metropolitan Area Ring Expressway	南京都市圈环线高速	Encircles Lai'an, Tianchang, Yizheng, Jurong, Nanjing, Quanjiao and Chuzhou of Anhui and Jiangsu			
G9905	Zhengzhou Metropolitan Area Ring Expressway	郑州都市圈环线高速	Encircles Xingyang, Zhongmu, Weishi, Xinzheng and Xinmi of Henan			
G9906	Wuhan Metropolitan Area Ring Expressway	武汉都市圈环线高速	Encircles Huarong, Liangzihu, Hannan, Hanchuan, Xiaogan and Xinzhou of Hubei			
G9907	Changzhutan Metropolitan Area Ring Expressway	长株潭都市圈环线高速	Encircles Ningxiang, Liuyang, Liling, Xiangxiang and Shaoshan cities of Changzhutan			
G9908	Xi'an Metropolitan Area Ring Expressway	西安都市圈环线高速	Encircles Lantian, Huyi, Zhouzhi, Wugong, Qianxian, Fuping and Weinan of Shaanxi			Completely multiplexed with G3021
G9909	Chongqing Metropolitan Area Ring Expressway	重庆都市圈环线高速	Encircles Yongchuan, Tongliang, Hechuan, Changshou, Fuling, Nanchuan and Qijiang districts of Chongqing, CQ	475 km		Formerly Chongqing S80 and Chongqing S0101
G9910	Chengdu Metropolitan Area Ring Expressway	成都都市圈环线高速	Encircles Dujiangyan, Shifang, Deyang, Zhongjiang, Pengshan and Pujiang of Sichuan	438 km		Formerly Sichuan SA3; complete
G9911	Jinan Metropolitan Area Ring Expressway	济南都市圈环线高速	Encircles Changqing, Qihe, Yucheng, Linyi, Jiyang and Zhangqiu of Shandong			
G9912	Hefei Metropolitan Area Ring Expressway	合肥都市圈环线高速	Encircles Feidong, Chaohu and Feixi of Hefei, AH			

== City ring expressways ==
In 2022, some ring expressways of coastal cities were removed due to geographical constraints, along with Lhasa's, due to its extremely rugged and mountainous terrain, and Shenzhen's, probably due to EIA problems regarding Hong Kong Frontier Closed Areas.

Number	Name	Chinese name	Terminus	Length	Formed	Notes
G0401	Changsha Ring Expressway	长沙绕城高速	Encircles Changsha, HN	102 km (63 mi)	2013	
G0601	Xining Ring Expressway	西宁绕城高速	Encircles Xining, QH		2015	
~~G0602~~	~~Lhasa Ring Expressway~~	~~拉萨绕城高速~~	~~Encircles Lhasa, XZ~~	—	cancelled	Was G0601 during 2013~2017; removed in 2022 plan
G1001	Harbin Ring Expressway	哈尔滨绕城高速	Encircles Harbin, HL	91 km (57 mi)	2009	
~~G1101~~	~~Dalian Ring Expressway~~	~~大连绕城高速~~	~~Encircles Dalian, LN~~	—	cancelled	Removed in 2022 plan
G1501	Shenyang Ring Expressway	沈阳绕城高速	Encircles Shenyang, LN		1995	
~~G1502~~	~~Qingdao Ring Expressway~~	~~青岛绕城高速~~	~~Encircles Qingdao, SD~~	—	cancelled	Was G1501 from 2013-2017; removed in 2022 plan
G1503	Shanghai Ring Expressway	上海绕城高速	Encircles Shanghai, SH	209 km (130 mi)	2022	Was G1501 from 2013-2017 and A30 before that
G1504	Ningbo Ring Expressway	宁波绕城高速	Encircles Ningbo, ZJ		2011	Was G1501 during 2013~2017
G1505	Fuzhou Ring Expressway	福州绕城高速	Encircles Fuzhou, FJ		2014 (northwestern section)	Was G1501 during 2013~2017
~~G1506~~	~~Xiamen Ring Expressway~~	~~厦门绕城高速~~	~~Encircles Xiamen, FJ~~	—	cancelled	Was G1503 during 2013~2017; removed in 2022 plan
~~G1507~~	~~Shenzhen Ring Expressway~~	~~深圳绕城高速~~	~~Encircles Shenzhen, GD~~	—	cancelled	Was G2501 during 2013~2017; removed in 2022 plan
G1508	Guangzhou Ring Expressway	广州绕城高速	Encircles Guangzhou, GD		2010	part of AH1; Was G1501 during 2013~2017
G2001	Jinan Ring Expressway	济南绕城高速	Encircles Jinan, SD		2002	
G2002	Shijiazhuang Ring Expressway	石家庄绕城高速	Encircles Shijiazhuang, HE			Was G2001 during 2013~2017
G2003	Taiyuan Ring Expressway	太原绕城高速	Encircles Taiyuan, SX		2017 (southern and northwestern sections)	Was G2001 during 2013~2017
G2004	Yinchuan Ring Expressway	银川绕城高速	Encircles Yinchuan, NX	59 km (37 mi)	2008	Was G0601 from 2013-2017
G2201	Lanzhou Ring Expressway	兰州绕城高速	Encircles Lanzhou, GS		2019	Was G3001 during 2013~2017
G2501	Changchun Ring Expressway	长春绕城高速	Encircles Changchun, JL	57 km (35 mi)	2002	Was G0102 during 2013~2017
G2502	Tianjin Ring Expressway	天津绕城高速	Encircles Tianjin, TJ		2016	Was G2501 during 2013~2017
G2503	Nanjing Ring Expressway	南京绕城高速	Encircles Nanjing, JS		2012	Was G2501 during 2013~2017
G2504	Hangzhou Ring Expressway	杭州绕城高速	Encircles Hangzhou, ZJ		2003	Was G2501 during 2013~2017
G3001	Zhengzhou Ring Expressway	郑州绕城高速	Encircles Zhengzhou, HA	106 km (66 mi)	2005	
G3002	Xi'an Ring Expressway	西安绕城高速	Encircles Xi'an, SN		2003	Was G3001 during 2013~2017
G3003	Ürümqi Ring Expressway	乌鲁木齐绕城高速	Encircles Ürümqi, XJ		2016 (eastern section)	Was G3001 during 2013~2017
G4001	Hefei Ring Expressway	合肥绕城高速	Encircles Hefei, AH		2008	
G4201	Wuhan Ring Expressway	武汉绕城高速	Encircles Wuhan, HB		2007	
G4202	Chengdu Ring Expressway	成都绕城高速	Encircles Chengdu, SC		2001	Was G4201 during 2013~2017
G4501	Beijing Ring Expressway	北京绕城高速	Encircles Beijing, BJ	220 km (140 mi)	2009	
G5001	Chongqing Ring Expressway	重庆绕城高速	Encircles Chongqing, CQ		2009	
G5601	Kunming Ring Expressway	昆明绕城高速	Encircles Kunming, YN		2014	
G5901	Hohhot Ring Expressway	呼和浩特绕城高速	Encircles Hohhot, NM	102 km (63 mi)	2008	Was G0601 during 2013~2017
G6001	Nanchang Ring Expressway	南昌绕城高速	Encircles Nanchang, JX		2007 (except southern section)	
G6002	Guiyang Ring Expressway	贵阳绕城高速	Encircles Guiyang, GZ		2007	Was G6001 during 2013~2017
G7201	Nanning Ring Expressway	南宁绕城高速	Encircles Nanning, GX		2003	
~~G9801~~	~~Haikou Ring Expressway~~	~~海口绕城高速~~	~~Encircles Haikou, HI~~	—	cancelled	Was G1501 during 2013~2017; removed in 2022 plan

== Provincial expressways with incorrect use of NTHS codes ==
1. "G1201" Jilin Ring Expressway (吉林绕城高速) - real G12, G1211 and G1212
2. "G1202" Songyuan Ring Expressway (松原绕城高速) - real G12, G45 and G1015
3. "G3022" Weinan Transit Expressway (渭南过境高速) - no real number
4. "G3023" Xixing Expressway (西兴高速)Was G30 before 2022 - no real number
5. "G3024" Baoji Transit Expressway (宝鸡过境高速) Was G30 before 2019 - no real number

=== Former ===
1. ~~"G0501"~~ S2202 Linfen Ring Expressway (临汾绕城高速)
2. ~~"G1204"~~ S17 Baicheng Ring Expressway (白城绕城高速)
3. ~~"G1502"~~ Quanzhou Ring Expressway (泉州绕城高速) real S11, S56, and S58; removed in 2022
4. ~~"G15E"~~ S15 ~~Shenhai Expressway~~ Zini Expressway (~~沈海高速~~ 紫泥高速)
5. ~~"G1801"~~ S5901 Shuozhou Ring Expressway (朔州绕城高速)
6. ~~"G2002"~~ S2003 Yangquan Ring Expressway (阳泉绕城高速)
7. ~~"G2201"~~ S2201 Changzhi Ring Expressway (长治绕城高速)
8. ~~"G4202"~~ SA2 Chengdu 2nd Ring Expressway (成都第二绕城高速)
9. ~~"G4203"~~ ~~SA3~~ G9910 Chengdu Metropolitan Area Ring Expressway (成都都市圈环线高速)
10. ~~"G47"~~ S47 Nenjiang-Dandong Expressway (嫩丹高速公路) part of G4512 Shuangliao–Nenjiang Expressway
11. ~~"G5501"~~ S5501 Datong Ring Expressway (大同绕城高速)
12. ~~"G76S1"~~ S76 Dongxiao Expressway (东肖高速公路)

== See also ==
- Expressways of China
- List of primary NTHS expressways

== Notes ==
1.This was during the time before 71118, when the sequence of beltways in Chengdu in the NTHS system from inner to outermost was G4201 - G4202 - G4203. Of these, only G4201 was ever a legitimate NTHS expressway. But after G4201 changed its number to G4202 as part of 71118, the former G4202 (described here) and G4203 were demoted to provincial S routes named SA2 and SA3 respectively. As of late 2022, SA2 remains a provincial expressway, but SA3 has been superseded by G9910.
