= AH31 =

Asian Highway route in Russia and China

Asian Highway 31
- AH31 in red

Route information
- Length: 1,595 km (991 mi)

Major junctions
- North end: Belogorsk, Amur Oblast, Russia
- South end: Dalian, Liaoning Province, China

Location
- Countries: Russia, China

Highway system
- Asian Highway Network
← AH30	→ AH32

Asian Highway 31 or AH31 is a route running 1,595 kilometres (991 mi) from Belogorsk, Amur Oblast in Russia to Dalian, Liaoning Province in China. The route in China is considered as potential Asian highway as per map. Belogorsk to Blagoveshchensk section of this Asian highway is named after Amur river as Amur Highway .

== Russia ==
- R 297: Belogorsk – Blagoveshchensk, 124 km (77 mi)
- 10K-243: Blagoveshchensk – border with China

== China ==
- G1211: Heihe - Harbin (when complete)
  - At the moment Bei'an - Harbin runs through: G1117 Bei'an North IC - S303 - G202 - G1001 Hazhao IC
- Within Harbin: G1001 Hazhao IC - Harbin IC - Qunli IC - Harbin South JCT
- G1: Harbin - Changchun - Shenyang
- Within Shenyang: G1501 Wangjiagou JCT - Shenyang East JCT - Xiashengou JCT - Jinbaotai JCT
- G15: Shenyang - Dalian

== Junctions ==
Russia
AH30 near Belogorsk, Russia
China
AH6 near Harbin
AH32 near Changchun
AH1 near Shenyang

== See also ==
- Asian Highway 6
- Asian Highway 30
- List of Asian Highways
