= China National Highway 302 =

Road in China

National Highway 302
- 302国道

Route information
- Length: 1,028 km (639 mi)

Major junctions
- From: Hunchun in Jilin
- To: Ulanhot in Inner Mongolia

Location
- Country: China

Highway system
- National Trunk Highway System; Primary; Auxiliary
← G301	→ G303

China National Highway 302 (G302) runs from Hunchun in Jilin to Ulanhot in Inner Mongolia. It is 1,028 kilometres (639 mi) in length.

== Route and distance ==
Route and distance

City	Distance (km)
Hunchun, Jilin	0
Tumen, Jilin	64
Yanji, Jilin	110
Antu County, Jilin	184
Dunhua, Jilin	249
Jiaohe, Jilin	358
Jilin City, Jilin	466
Changchun, Jilin	585
Nong'an, Jilin	649
Qian Gorlos, Jilin	740
Da'an, Jilin	806
Baicheng, Jilin	941
Ulan Hot, Inner Mongolia	1,028 kilometres (639 mi)

== See also ==
- China National Highways
