= China National Highway 202 =

Road in China

National Highway 202
- 202国道

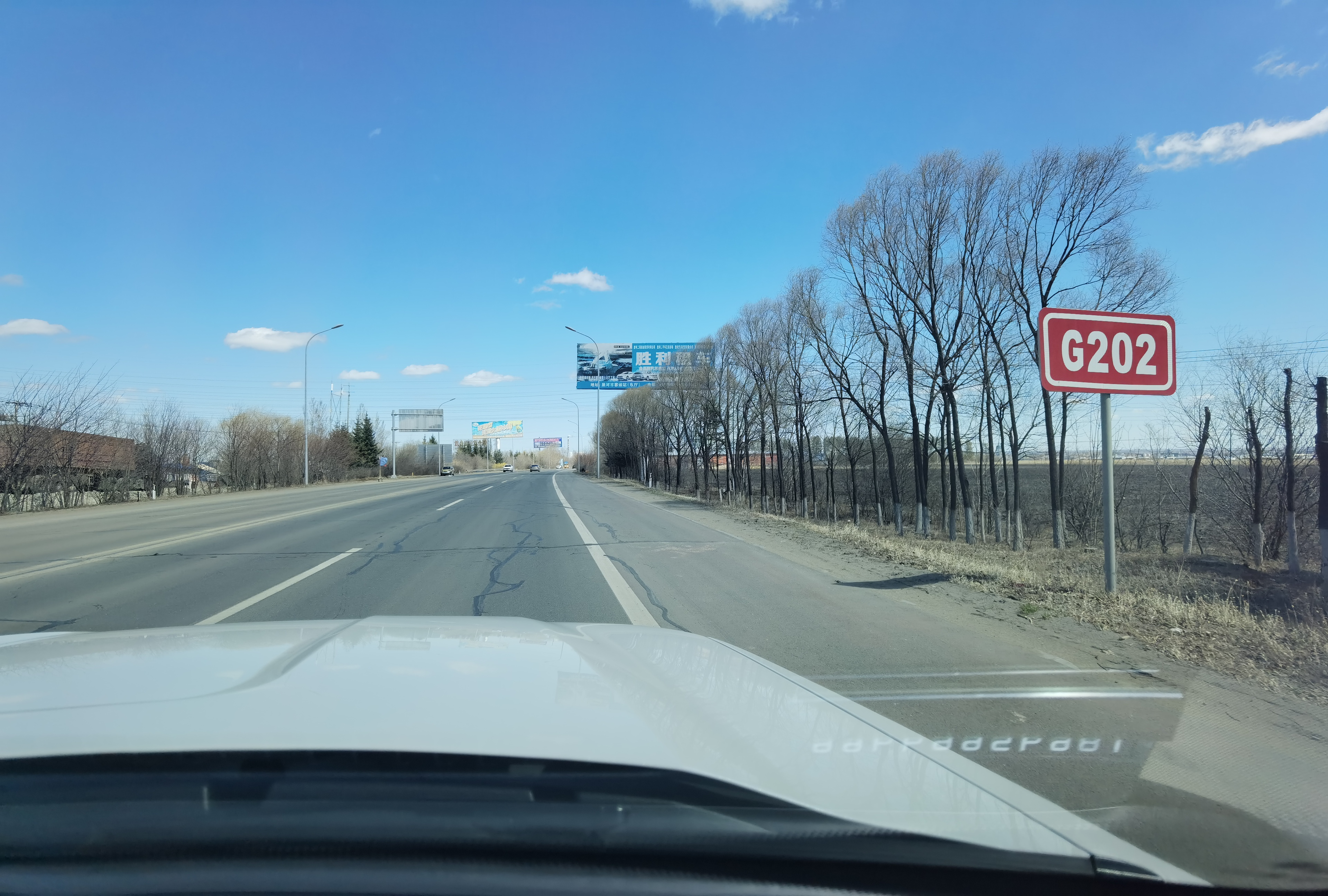
- Airport Rd. in Heihe, a part of National Highway 202

Route information
- Length: 1,818 km (1,130 mi)

Major junctions
- From: Heihe in Heilongjiang
- To: Lushunkou in Liaoning

Location
- Country: China

Highway system
- National Trunk Highway System; Primary; Auxiliary
| ← G201 | → G203 |

China National Highway 202 (G202) runs from Heihe in Heilongjiang to Lüshunkou, Dalian in Liaoning. It is 1,818 kilometres in length and runs south from Heihe, going via Harbin and Shenyang.

== Route and distance ==
Route and distance

| City | Distance (km) |
|---|---|
| Heihe, Heilongjiang | 0 |
| Sunwu, Heilongjiang | 112 |
| Bei'an, Heilongjiang | 297 |
| Kedong, Heilongjiang | 342 |
| Baiquan, Heilongjiang | 392 |
| Mingshui, Heilongjiang | 432 |
| Qinggang, Heilongjiang | 492 |
| Lanxi County, Heilongjiang | 543 |
| Harbin, Heilongjiang | 622 |
| Yushu, Jilin | 751 |
| Jilin City, Jilin | 878 |
| Yongji County, Jilin | 905 |
| Panshi, Jilin | 1021 |
| Meihekou, Jilin | 1086 |
| Qingyuan Manchu Autonomous County, Liaoning | 1176 |
| Fushun, Liaoning | 1303 |
| Shenyang, Liaoning | 1362 |
| Dengta, Liaoning | 1394 |
| Liaoyang, Liaoning | 1423 |
| Anshan, Liaoning | 1455 |
| Haicheng, Liaoning | 1492 |
| Dashiqiao, Liaoning | 1522 |
| Gaizhou, Liaoning | 1549 |
| Pulandian, Liaoning | 1697 |
| Jinzhou (Dalian), Liaoning | 1738 |
| Dalian, Liaoning | 1774 |
| Lushunkou, Liaoning | 1818 |

== See also ==
- China National Highways
