= List of primary NTHS expressways =

National Trunk Highway System
- NTHS expressway marker

- NTHS expressway in China

System information
- Formed: 13 January 2005; 21 years ago

Highway names
- NTHS: GXX (green)

System links
- National Trunk Highway System; Primary; Auxiliary

The primary routes (主线) of National Trunk Highway System expressways of China are numbered with one- or two-digit designations. Generally, one-digit routes radiate from Beijing, for two-digit routes, odd-numbered routes under 90 run north–south, with lower numbers in the east and higher numbers in the west; even-numbered routes under 90 run east–west, with lower numbers in the north and higher numbers in the south; while 9X routes are zonal beltways.

Their associated branch expressways are using four-digit designations, with the first two digits selected from this list, see the separate linked list for details.

In this list under number column, the gray colored routes are not yet completed. These routes are officially printed in the 2022 National Highway Network Plan.

== Primary NTHS expressways ==
Number	Name	Chinese name	Origin	Terminus	Length	Formed	Notes
G1	Jingha Expressway	京哈高速	Beijing, BJ	Harbin, HL	1,209 km (751 mi)	2000	part of AH1 (between Beijing and Shenyang) and AH31 (between Shenyang and Harbin)
G2	Jinghu Expressway	京沪高速	Beijing, BJ	Shanghai, SH	1,261.99 km (784.16 mi)	2000	part of AH3 (between Beijing and Tianjin); formerly multiplexed with G3 between Cangzhou and Langfang until current G2 alignment was built.
G3	Jingtai Expressway	京台高速	Beijing, BJ	Pingtan, FJ (de facto) (de jure: Taipei, TW)	2,030 km (1,260 mi)	2020 (mainland section only)	See also Political Status of Taiwan. A theoretical and unbuilt bridge/tunnel way connecting Pingtan, FJ with Taoyuan, TW; from there, G3 would follow the alignment of Nat 1 to Taipei. Without this linking section it would be otherwise complete. Formerly multiplexed with G2 between Cangzhou and Langfang until current G2 alignment was built.
G4	Jinggang'ao Expressway	京港澳高速	Beijing, BJ	port of Hong Kong, HK	2,285 km (1,420 mi)	1996	part of AH1 connects to Route 9 (Hong Kong) via Huanggang Port, Lok Ma Chau Control Point, and San Sham Road.
G5	Jingkun Expressway	京昆高速	Beijing, BJ	Kunming, YN	2,865 km (1,780 mi)	2015	By strictly, the first 8.5 km section (from east of Liangtuolu bridge to Dajian Road IC) is S66, though a re-route to Mentougou is considering.
G6	Jingzang Expressway	京藏高速	Beijing, BJ	Lhasa, XZ	3,718 km (2,310 mi)	2021 (except Golmud–Nagqu)	part of AH3 (between Beijing and Ulanqab) and AH42 (between Lanzhou and Lhasa) multiplexed with G7 between Bayannur and Beijing in the original plan until the China National Highway 110 traffic jam; still de facto multiplexed between Huailai and Changping due to a freeway gap in G7 (see below).
G7	Jingxin Expressway	京新高速	Beijing, BJ	Ürümqi, XJ	2,540 km (1,580 mi)	2021 (except some sections in Beijing, see notes)	multiplexed with G6 between Bayannur and Beijing in the original plan until the China National Highway 110 traffic jam. The section between Yuequan Road crossing and Jimen bridge had its build postponed due to Jingzhang intercity railway Qinghuayuan tunnel, and it is unclear as to when its construction will start; between Deshengkou tunnel and Laoyinzhuang junction, only southbound section is opened for freight transport; northbound section of this, and section between Laoyinzhuang and Yanqing East junctions, are also not built, and construction plans are stalled in favor of S3801 Jingli expressway; therefore de facto multiplexed with either G6 or S3801 between Huailai and Changping. Also formerly used current S22 and G30 in Xinjiang.
G10	Suiman Expressway	绥满高速	port of Suifenhe, HL	port of Manzhouli, NM	1,527 km (949 mi)	2013	part of AH6; Connects to A 184 (Russia) via Suifenhe Port, and A 350 (Russia) via Manzhouli Port.
G11	Heda Expressway	鹤大高速	Hegang, HL	Dalian, LN	1,474 km (916 mi)	2022	
G12	Hunwu Expressway	珲乌高速	Fangchuan, Hunchun, JL	Ulanhot, NM	925 km (575 mi)	2010	part of AH32 may connect to North Korean road (North Korea) via Quanhe Port, or 05A-214 road (Russia) via Hunchun Port.
G15	Shenhai Expressway	沈海高速	Shenyang, LN	Haikou, HI	3,710 km (2,310 mi)	2022 (except Dalian–Yantai and Xuwen–Haikou)	part of AH31 (between Shenyang and Dalian)
G16	Danxi Expressway	丹锡高速	Dandong, LN	Xilinhot, NM	960 km (600 mi)	2019	
G18	Rongwu Expressway	荣乌高速	Rongcheng, SD	Wuhai, NM	1,820 km (1,130 mi)	2019 (except Wendeng–Weihai)	
G20	Qingyin Expressway	青银高速	Qingdao, SD	Yinchuan, NX	1,610 km (1,000 mi)	2008	
G22	Qinglan Expressway	青兰高速	Qingdao, SD	Lanzhou, GS	1,852 km (1,151 mi)	2021	
G25	Changshen Expressway	长深高速	Changchun, JL	Shenzhen, GD	3,585 km (2,228 mi)	2020	
G30	Lianhuo Expressway	连霍高速	Lianyungang, JS	port of Khorgas, XJ	4,395 km (2,731 mi)	2014	part of AH9 (entire route), AH34 (between Lianyungang and Xi'an), AH5 (between Xi'an and Khorgas) and AH4 (between Ürümqi and Toksun); Longest contiguous expressway in China. Connects to A 353 (Kazakhstan) via Khorgas Port.
G35	Jiguang Expressway	济广高速	Jinan, SD	Guangzhou, GD	2,110 km (1,310 mi)	2018	
G36	Ningluo Expressway	宁洛高速	Nanjing, JS	Luoyang, HA	722 km (449 mi)	2006	
G40	Hushaan Expressway	沪陕高速	Pudong, Shanghai, SH	Xi'an, SN	1,490 km (930 mi)	2012	part of AH5 (between Nanjing and Xi'an)
G42	Hurong Expressway	沪蓉高速	Shanghai, SH	Chengdu, SC	1,966 km (1,222 mi)	2014	part of AH5 (between Shanghai and Nanjing)
G45	Daguang Expressway	大广高速	Daqing, HL	Guangzhou, GD	3,437 km (2,136 mi)	2015	
G50	Huyu Expressway	沪渝高速	Shanghai, SH	Chongqing, CQ	1,768 km (1,099 mi)	2010	
G55	Erguang Expressway	二广高速	Erenhot, NM	Guangzhou, GD	2,685 km (1,668 mi)	2022	part of AH3 (between Erenhot and Ulanqab)
G56	Hangrui Expressway	杭瑞高速	Hangzhou, ZJ	port of Ruili, YN	3,404 km (2,115 mi)	2018	part of AH14 (between Kunming and Ruili); Connects to NH 3 (Myanmar) via Ruili Port.
G59	Hubei Expressway	呼北高速	Hohhot, NM	Tieshangang, Beihai, GX	2,628 km (1,633 mi)	2023	Added in 71118
G60	Hukun Expressway	沪昆高速	Shanghai, SH	Kunming, YN	2,355.9 km (1,463.9 mi)	2011	part of AH3
G65	Baomao Expressway	包茂高速	Baotou, NM	Maoming, GD	3,003 km (1,866 mi)	2017	
G69	Yinbai Expressway	银百高速	Yinchuan, NX	Longbang port, Baise, GX	2,570 km (1,600 mi)	2030	Added in 71118, connects to Tien Yen–Lang Son–Cao Bang Expressway (Vietnam) via Longbang Port.
G70	Fuyin Expressway	福银高速	Changle, Fuzhou, FJ	Yinchuan, NX	2,485 km (1,544 mi)	2011	
G72	Quannan Expressway	泉南高速	Quanzhou, FJ	Nanning, GX	1,635 km (1,016 mi)	2013	
G75	Lanhai Expressway	兰海高速	Lanzhou, GS	Haikou, HI	2,650 km (1,650 mi)	2022 (except Xuwen–Haikou)	
G76	Xiarong Expressway	厦蓉高速	Xiamen, FJ	Chengdu, SC	2,295 km (1,426 mi)	2017	
G78	Shankun Expressway	汕昆高速	Shantou, GD	Kunming, YN	1,825 km (1,134 mi)	2019	
G80	Guangkun Expressway	广昆高速	Guangzhou, GD	Kunming, YN	1,386 km (861 mi)	2012	part of AH1 (between Guangzhou and Nanning) and AH14 (between Kaiyuan and Kunming)
G85	Yinkun Expressway	银昆高速	Yinchuan, NX	Kunming, YN	2,322 km (1,443 mi)	2024	Extended in 71118 (added Yinchuan-Chongqing section)

== Zonal ring expressways ==
Number	Name	Chinese name	Terminus	Length	Formed	Notes
G91	Central Liaoning Ring Expressway	辽中环线高速	Encircles central Liaoning area	400 km (250 mi)	2018	Interconnects Tieling, Fushun, Benxi, Liaoyang, Liaozhong and Xinmin.
G92	Hangzhou Bay Ring Expressway	杭州湾环线高速	Encircles Hangzhou Bay Area	427 km (265 mi)	2008 (old plan)	Interconnects Shanghai, SH, Hangzhou and Ningbo. In 2022 plan, the Ningbo-Shanghai section has been separated from G15, it will be a fixed link go through Beilun, Zhoushan and Yangshan Port Area.
G93	Chengyu Ring Expressway	成渝环线高速	Encircles Chengyu Metropolitan Region	1,200 km (750 mi)	2013	Interconnects Chengdu, Mianyang, Suining, Chongqing, CQ, Hejiang, Luzhou, Yibin, Leshan and Ya'an.
G94	Pearl River Delta Ring Expressway	珠三角环线高速	Encircles Guangdong–Hong Kong–Macau Greater Bay Area	470.6 km (292.4 mi)	2018	Interconnects Shenzhen, Zhuhai, Zhongshan, Jiangmen, Foshan, Huadu, Zengcheng and Dongguan of Mainland China, and ports of Hong Kong and Macau (connect by Hong Kong–Zhuhai–Macau Bridge ports).
G95	Capital Area Loop Expressway	首都环线高速	Encircles Beijing Metropolitan Area	1,011 km (628 mi) (estimate)	2018 (except Ninghe-Langfang)	Added in 71118, interconnects Chengde, Zunhua, Yutian, Jizhou, Baodi, Ninghe, Wuqing, Langfang, Gu'an, Zhuozhou, Zhuolu, Zhangjiakou, Chongli, Guyuan and Fengning of Jingjinji Area. Former route run through Yingshouyingzi, Xinglong, Pinggu, Sanhe, Dachang and Tongzhou between Chengde and Langfang, changed in 2022 in order to reduce traffic jams in Tongzhou sub-CBD.
G98	Hainan Island Ring Expressway	海南环岛高速	Encircles Hainan Province	612.804 km (380.779 mi)	2012	Interconnects Haikou, Qionghai, Sanya, Dongfang and Haikou.
~~G99~~	~~Taiwan Ring Expressway~~	~~台湾环线高速~~	Encircles Taiwan Province	—	cancelled	Officially removed in 2022 plan. See Political Status of Taiwan. See also Highway System in Taiwan for the current ROC-maintained Taiwan freeway system, which uses a different numbering system; the planned western half of G99 would follow the course of Nat 1.

== See also ==
- Expressways of China
- List of auxiliary NTHS expressways
