= List of long road tunnels in China =

There are four classes of road tunnels in China by length.

1. Super-long tunnel (>3,000m)
2. Long tunnel (1,000m-3,000m)
3. Middle-tunnel (250m-1,000m)
4. Short tunnel (<250m)

By 2012, there are 10,022 road tunnels and 8,052.7 km in total length in mainland China, including 441 super-long tunnels with 1,984.8 km in total length and 1,944 long tunnels with 3,304.4 km in total length.

This page lists the road tunnels longer than 5 km (3 mi) in mainland China.

Name	Province	Length	Year built	Tubes x Lanes	Road	Notes
Tianshan Shengli Tunnel (天山胜利隧道)	Xinjiang	22.130 km (13.751 mi)	2025	2x2	G0711 Ürümqi–Ruoqiang Expressway	Left tube: 22,130m, Right tube: 21,996m Elevation: 3,200m
Yuexi Tunnel (越喜隧道)	Sichuan	18.39 km (11.427 mi)	u/c	2x2	S71 Sichuan Jinkouhe-Xichang Expressway	Left tube: 18,390m, Right tube: 18,380m
Zhongnanshan Tunnel (终南山隧道)	Shaanxi	18.020 km (11.197 mi)	2007	2x2	G65 Baotou–Maoming Expressway	
Jingpingshan Tunnel (锦屏山隧道)	Sichuan	17.504 km (10.876 mi)	2011	2x1	Jingping Hydro Power Station Highway	A tube:17,485.07m, B tube: 17,504.245m
Tiantaishan Tunnel (天台山隧道)	Shaanxi	15.560 km (9.669 mi)	2021	2x3	G85 Yinchuan–Kunming Expressway	world's longest 6-lane dual tube expressway tunnel.
Daliangshan #1 Tunnel (大凉山一号隧道)	Sichuan	15.366 km (9.548 mi)	2025	2x2	S7 Sichuan Leshan-Xichang Expressway	Left tube: 15,324m, Right tube: 15,280m
Muzhailing Tunnel (木寨岭隧道)	Gansu	15.226 km (9.461 mi)	2024	2x2	G75 Lanzhou–Haikou Expressway	Left tube: 15,226m, Right tube: 15,160m
West Tianshan Tunnel (西天山隧道)	Xinjiang	15.707 km (9.760 mi)	u/c	2x2	China National Highway 219	
Tongde Tunnel (同德隧道)	Sichuan	14.520 km (9.022 mi)	u/c	2x2	S87 Sichuan Panzhihua Yanyuan Expressway	Left tube: 14,450m, Right tube: 14,520m
Qingdao Jiaozhou Bay Submarine Tunnel (青岛胶州湾海底隧道)	Shandong	14.370 km (8.929 mi)	u/c	2x3		world's longest under sea road tunnel
Yanyuan Tunnel (盐源隧道)	Sichuan	14.157 km (8.797 mi)	u/c	2x2	G76_{11} Duyun-Shangri-la Expressway	Left tube:13,890m, Right tube:14,104m
Taihangshan Tunnel (太行山隧道)	Shanxi	14.104 km (8.764 mi)	u/c	2x2	Shanxi S60 Xiyang-Yuci Expressway	Left tube:13,890m, Right tube:14,104m
Xiaogaoshan Tunnel (小高山隧道)	Sichuan	14.032 km (8.719 mi)	u/c	2x2	G76_{11} Duyun-Shangri-la Expressway	
Micangshan Tunnel (米仓山隧道)	Sichuan	13.833 km (8.6 mi)	2018	2x2	G85 Yinchuan–Kunming Expressway	left tube: 13,833m right tube:13,792m
Dabashan Tunnel (大巴山隧道)	Shaanxi-Chongqing	13.715 km (8.522 mi)	2025	2x2	G69 Yinchuan–Baise Expressway	
Xishan Tunnel (西山隧道)	Shanxi	13.654 km (8.5 mi)	2012	2x2	S56 Shanxi Taiyuan-Gujiao Expressway	Left tube:13,654m, Right tube:13,570m
Erlangshan Tunnel (二郎山隧道)	Sichuan	13.433 km (8.3 mi)	2017	2x2	G42_{18} Ya'an-Yecheng Expressway	Left tube: 13,433m, Right tube: 13,381m
Shiziping Tunnel (狮子坪隧道)	Sichuan	13.156 km (8.175 mi)	2020	2x2	G42_{17} Chengdu-Changdu Expressway	
Hongtiguan Tunnel (虹梯关隧道)	Shanxi	13.122 km (8.154 mi)	2013	2x2	S76 Shanxi Changzhi-Pingshun Expressway	Left tube: 13,122m, Right tube: 13,098m
Baima Tunnel (白马隧道)	Sichuan	13.010 km (8.084 mi)	2025	2x2	G8513 Pingliang-Mianyang Expressway	Left tube: 12,878m, Right tube: 12,945m
Guigala Tunnel (圭嘎拉隧道)	Xizang	12.790 km (7.947 mi)	2024	2x2	Lhasa-Tsetang Expressway	Left tube: 12,790m, Right tube: 12,780m Elevation: 4,300m
Daliangshan #2 Tunnel (大凉山二号隧道)	Sichuan	12.475 km (7.752 mi)	2024	2x2	Leshan-Xichang Expressway	
Fengjian Tunnel (奉建隧道)	Chongqing - Hubei	12.360 km (7.7 mi)	u/c	2x2	G69_{11} Ankang-Laifeng Expressway	
Gaoloushan Tunnel (高楼山隧道)	Gansu	12.334 km (7.7 mi)	2024	2x2	G8513 Pingliang-Mianyang Expressway	Left tube: 12,334m, Right tube: 12,204m
Maijishan Tunnel (麦积山隧道)	Gansu	12.290 km (7.6 mi)	2009	2x2	G30 Lianyungang–Khorgas Expressway	Left tube: 12,286m, Right tube: 12,290m
Mengpeng Tunnel (勐捧隧道)	Yunnan	12.205 km (7.6 mi)	u/c	2x2	Ruili-Menglian Expressway	
Daxiagu Tunnel (大峡谷隧道)	Sichuan	12.146 km (7.5 mi)	2023	2x2	Emeishan-Hanyuan Expressway	world deepest tunnel, 1,944 meters under the mountain.
Gongjuegaoshan Tunnel (贡觉高山隧道)	Sichuan	12.095 km (7.5 mi)	u/c	2x2	G76_{11} Duyun-Shangrila Expressway	
North Tianshan Tunnel (北天山隧道)	Xinjiang	11.888 km (7.4 mi)	u/c	2x2	China National Highway 577	
Muli Tunnel (木里隧道)	Sichuan	11.825 km (7.348 mi)	u/c	2x2	G76_{11} Duyun-Shangri-la Expressway Muli Branch	
Chuanxing Tunnel (川兴隧道)	Sichuan	11.796 km (7.330 mi)	u/c	2x2	S71 Sichuan Jinhekou-Xichang Expressway	Left tube: 11,769m, Right tube: 11,754m
East Tianshan Tunnel (东天山隧道)	Xinjiang	11.775 km (7.3 mi)	2021	2x2	China National Highway 575	Left tube: 11,764m, Right tube: 11,775m
Laoyin Tunnel (老营隧道)	Yunnan	11.515 km (7.2 mi)	2021	2x2	G56_{13} Baoshan-Lushui Expressway	Left tube: 11,505m, Right tube: 11,515m, 1,270m deep
Chengkai Tunnel (城开隧道)	Chongqing	11.489 km (7.1 mi) (Note: Left tube: 11,489m, Right tube: 11,456m)	2022	2x2	G69 Yinchuan–Baise Expressway	Left tube: 11,489m, Right tube: 11,456m
Changbai Tunnel (长柏隧道)	Sichuan	11.446 km (7.1 mi)	u/c	2x2	G76_{11} Duyun-Shangrila Expressway	
Xiamaidi Tunnel (下麦地隧道)	Sichuan	11.440 km (7.1 mi)	u/c	2x2	G76_{11} Duyun-Shangrila Expressway	
Yunshan Tunnel (云山隧道)	Shanxi	11.408 km (7.1 mi)	2014	2x2	G25_{16} Dongying–Lüliang Expressway	Left tube: 11,408m, Right tube: 11,377m
Yingpanshan Tunnel (营盘山隧道)	Yunnan	11.310 km (7.0 mi) (Note: left tube: 11,300m, right tube: 11,335m)	2022	2x2	G42_{16} Chengdu-Lijiang Expressway	Left tube: 11,272m, Right tube: 11,310m
Baojiashan Tunnel (包家山隧道)	Shaanxi	11.200 km (7.0 mi)	2009	2x2	G65 Baotou–Maoming Expressway	Left tube: 11,200m, Right tube: 11,195m
Haitai Yangtse River Tunnel (海太长江隧道)	Jiangsu	11.185 km (7.0 mi)	u/c	2x3	S13 Tongzhouwan-Changshu Expressway	
Huzhubeishan Tunnel (互助北山隧道)	Qinghai	11.171 km (6.9 mi)	2025	2x2	China National Highway G341	
Taiyueshan Tunnel (太岳山隧道)	Shanxi	11.165 km (6.9 mi)	u/c	2x2	G22_{11} Changzhi-Yan'an Expressway	Left tube: 11,135m, Right tube: 11,165m
Pengshui Tunnel (彭水隧道)	Chongqing	11.135 km (6.9 mi)	2025	2x2	G65 Baotou–Maoming Expressway	
Jinyang Tunnel (金阳隧道)	Sichuan	11.095 km (6.9 mi)	u/c	2x2	G76_{11} Duyun-Shangri-la Expressway	
Hejian #1 Tunnel (鹤剑一号隧道)	Yunnan	11.036 km (6.9 mi)	u/c	2x2	Heqing-Jianchuan-Lanping Expressway	Left tube: 10,983m, Right tube: 11,036m
Lianfeng Tunnel (莲峰隧道)	Yunnan	11.000 km (6.835 mi)	2024	2x2	Dali-Yongsheng Expressway	left tube: 10,990m, right tube: 11,000m
Wuhan Lianghu East Lake Tunnel (两湖隧道东湖段)	Hubei	11 km (6.8 mi)	u/c	2x2x2		
Dengloushan Tunnel (登楼山隧道)	Yunnan	10.990 km (6.8 mi) (Note: left tube: 10,990m, right tube: 10,922m)	u/c	2x2	G80_{12} Mile-Chuxiong Expressway	
Jintang Under Sea Road Tunnel (金塘海底公路隧道)	Zhejiang	10.990 km (6.8 mi)	u/c	2x3	Zhejiang Dinghai-Daishan Expressway	
Taihu Tunnel (太湖隧道)	Jiangsu	10.790 km (6.7 mi)	2021	2x3 + 1 utility tube	Shanghai-Changzhou Expressway	
Lianghong Tunnel (凉红隧道)	Sichuan	10.6 km (6.6 mi)	u/c	2x2	S71 Jinkouhe-Xichang Expressway	
Mianya Tunnel (棉桠隧道)	Sichuan	10.581 km (6.6 mi)	u/c	2x2	G76_{11} Duyun-Shangri-la Expressway	
Yunlingxuebangshan Tunnel (云岭雪邦山隧道)	Yunnan	10.535 km (6.5 mi)	u/c	2x2	Heqing-Jianchuan-Lanping Expressway	left tube: 10,535m, right tube: 10,535m
Tongzi Tunnel (桐梓隧道)	Guizhou	10.497 km (6.5 mi)	2022	2x3	G75_{21} Chongqing-Guiyang Expressway	left tube: 10,497m, right tube: 10,485m
Dawanshan Tunnel (大万山隧道)	Shanxi	10.490 km (6.5 mi)	2022	2x2	Jingle-Xingxian Expressway	left tube: 10,490m, right tube: 10,379m
Baotashan Tunnel (宝塔山隧道)	Shanxi	10.480 km (6.5 mi)	2012	2x2	G25_{16} Dongying–Lüliang Expressway	Left tube: 10,192m, Right tube: 10,480m
Ninghui Tunnel (宁会隧道)	Sichuan	10.297 km (6.398 mi)	2025	2x2	G42_{16} Chengdu-Lijiang Expressway	left tube: 10,297m, right tube: 10,251m
Daliangshan Tunnel (大亮山隧道)	Yunnan	10.235 km (6.4 mi)	u/c	2x2	G56_{12} Dali-Lincang Expressway	left tube: 10,235m, right tube: 10,210m
Cuiping Tunnel (翠屏隧道)	Yunnan	10.127 km (6.3 mi)	u/c	2x2	G76_{11} Duyun-Shangrila Expressway	left tube: 10,127m, right tube: 10,040m
Dajing Tunnel (大箐隧道)	Sichuan	10.059 km (6.3 mi)	u/c	2x2	Sichuan S71 Xichang-Ningnan Expressway	
Nibashan Tunnel (泥巴山隧道) (Note: previous name is Daxiangling Tunnel （大相岭隧道）)	Sichuan	10.007 km (6.2 mi) 9.962 km (6.2 mi)	2012	2x2	G5 Beijing–Kunming Expressway	Left tube: 9,962m, Right tube: 10,007m
Niutoushan Tunnel (牛头山隧道)	Zhejiang	9.970 km (6.2 mi)	u/c	2x2	Yiwu-Longquan-Qingyuan Expressway	
Gongga Tunnel (贡嘎隧道)	Sichuan	9.961 km (6.2 mi)	u/c	1x2	China National Highway G549	
Jingping Tunnel (锦屏隧道)	Sichuan	9.930 km (6.170 mi)	u/c	2x2	G42_{16} Chengdu-Lijiang Expressway	left tube: 9,930m, right tube: 9,922m
Azhahe #1 Tunnel (阿扎河一号隧道)	Yunnan	9.885 km (6.142 mi)	u/c	2x2	Yuanyang-Lüchun Expressway	Left tube: 9,870m, Right tube: 9,885m
Lüliangshan Tunnel (吕梁山隧道)	Shanxi	9.806 km (6.093 mi)	u/c	2x2	Xiyang-Qikou Expressway	Left tube: 9,806m, Right tube: 9,806m
Baiyunshan Tunnel (白云山隧道)	Hubei	9.785 km (6.1 mi)	u/c	2x2	G59_{12} Fangxian-Wufeng Expressway	
Lehong Tunnel (乐红隧道)	Yunnan	9.753 km (6.1 mi)	2023	2x2	G76_{11} Duyun-Shangri-la Expressway	left tube: 9,753m, right tube: 9,752m
Zhongtiaoshan Tunnel (中条山隧道)	Shanxi	9.77 km (6.07 mi)	2014	2x2	G59 Hohhot–Beihai Expressway	
Guanshan Tunnel (关山隧道)	Gansu	9.651 km (6.0 mi)	2021	2x2	G85_{13} Pingliang-Mianyang Expressway	left tube: 9,585m, right tube: 9,651m
Mopanshan Tunnel (磨盘山隧道)	Sichuan	9.650 km (6.0 mi)	u/c	2x2	G76_{11} Duyun-Shangrila Expressway	
Liupanshan Tunnel (六盘山隧道)	Ningxia	9.49 km (5.9 mi)	2012	2x2	G22 Qingdao–Lanzhou Expressway	Left tube: 9,490m, Right tube: 9,480m
Yanglin Tunnel (杨林隧道)	Yunnan	9.470 km (5.884 mi)	2020	2x3	G5601 Kunming Ring Expressway	
Wuzhishan Tunnel (五指山隧道)	Sichuan	9.405 km (5.844 mi)	2023	2x2	G42_{16} Chengdu-Lijiang Expressway	Left tube: 9,392m, Right tube: 9,405m
Changma Tunnel (昌马隧道)	Gansu	9.384 km (5.8 mi)	u/c	2x2	Gansu S20 Jiayuguan-Ruoqiang Expressway	left tube: 9,384m, right tube: 9,373m
Beijing East Sixth Ring Road Tunnel (北京东六环地下隧道)	Beijing	9.35 km (5.81 mi)	2025	2x3	G4501 Beijing 6th Ring Road	
Jiajinshan Tunnel (夹金山隧道)	Sichuan	9.35 km (5.81 mi)	2025	1x2	China National Highway G351	
Niuyanshan Tunnel (牛岩山隧道)	Fujian	9.252 km (5.749 mi)	2015	2x2	G3 Beijing–Taipei Expressway	Left tube: 9,252m, Right tube: 9,198m
Wankai Tunnel (万开隧道)	Chongqing	9.228 km (5.7 mi)	2021	2x2	Wangzhou-Kaizhou Rapid Road	
Xidazhuangke Tunnel (西大庄科隧道)	Beijing-Hebei	9.203 km (5.718 mi)	2020	2x2	Yanqing, Beijing-Chongli District Expressway	Left tube: 9,203m, Right tube: 9,174m
Laojieling Tunnel (老界岭隧道)	Henan	9.183 km (5.706 mi)	2021	2x2	Zhengzhou-Luanchuan	
Ningqiao Tunnel (宁巧隧道)	Sichuan	9.103 km (5.656 mi)	u/c	2x2	G42_{16} Chengdu-Lijiang Expressway	Left tube: 9,069m, Right tube: 9,103m
West Qinling Tunnel(西秦岭隧道) (Note: previous name is Mayazi Tunnel (麻崖子隧道))	Gansu	9.007 km (5.597 mi)	2013	2x2	G75 Lanzhou–Haikou Expressway	Left tube: 8,985m, Right tube: 9,007m
Yaling Tunne (衙岭隧道)	Shaanxi	8.968 km (5.572 mi)	2025	2x2	Meixian-Taibai Expressway	
Shanghai Yangtse River Tunnel (上海长江隧道)	Shanghai	8.95 km (5.56 mi)	2009	2x3	G40 Shanghai–Xi'an Expressway	2 tubes, world's widest tunnel
Wudongde Tunnel (乌东德隧道)	Sichuan	8.922 km (5.544 mi)	u/c	2x2	S81 Sichuan Huili-Luquan Expressway	
Jiashatian Tunnel (贾沙田隧道)	Sichuan	8.902 km (5.531 mi)	2025	2x2	G42_{16} Chengdu-Lijiang Expressway	Left tube: 8,863m, Right tube: 8,902m
Paomashan #1 Tunnel (跑马山一号隧道)	Sichuan	8.865 km (5.5 mi)	u/c	2x2	G42_{18} Ya'an-Yecheng Expressway	Left tube: 8,865m, Right tube: 8,780m 1,200m deep; the elevation difference of 2 outlets is 220m, world's biggest
Xinglong Tunnel (兴隆隧道)	Yunnan	8.843 km (5.495 mi)	2022	2x2	Jianshui-Yuanyang Expressway	Left tube: 8,840m, Right tube: 8,843m
Foling Tunnel (佛岭隧道)	Shanxi	8.805 km (5.5 mi)	2016	2x2	S45 Shanxi Tianli Expressway	Left tube: 8,803m, Right tube: 8,805m
Taixu Tunnel (太徐隧道)	Shanxi	8.796 km (5.5 mi)	2024	2x3	G20_{03} Taiyuan Ring Expressway	
Zhegushan Tunnel (鹧鸪山隧道)	Sichuan	8,795 km (5,465.0 mi)	2019	2x2	S9 Sichuan Wenchuan-Maerkang Expressway	Left tube: 8,795m, Right tube: 8,766m, Elevation: 3,200m, 1350m deep
Baoding #2 Tunnel (宝鼎二号隧道)	Sichuan	8.775 km (5.5 mi)	2020	2x2	Panzhihua-Dali Expressway	
Micangshan Tunnel (米仓山隧道)	Gansu	8.694 km (5.4 mi)	2014	2x2	G8513 Pingliang-Mianyang Expressway	left tube: 8694m right tube:8668m
Jinlong Tunnel (金龙隧道)	Hubei	8.693 km (5.4 mi)	2010	2x2	G50 Shanghai–Chongqing Expressway	left tube: 8693m right tube:8678m
Dapanshan Tunnel (大盘山隧道)	Zhejiang	8.678 km (5.392 mi)	2020	2x2	Hangzhou-Shaoxin-Taizhou Expressway	Left tube: 8,640m, Right tube: 8,776m
Huangzhushan Tunnel (黄竹山隧道)	Fujian	8.6596 km (5.4 mi)	2015	2x2	G3 Beijing–Taipei Expressway	
Tiefengshan Tunnel (铁峰山隧道)	Chongqing	8.648 km (5.4 mi)	u/c	2x2	G50_{12} Enshi-Guangyuan Expressway	
Tianheshan Tunnel (天河山隧道)	Shanxi-Hebei	8.511 km (5.3 mi)	2015	2x2	S66 Shanxi Hefen Expressway	left tube: 8,511m, right tube 8,477m
Huimin Tunnel (惠民隧道)	Yunnan	8.475 km (5.3 mi)	u/c	2x2	Yuanyang-Lüchun Expressway	left tube: 8,475m, right tube: 8,475m
Cuiyunshan Tunnel (翠云山隧道)	Hebei	8.438 km (5.243 mi)	2021	2x2	S38_{01} Beijing-Chongli Expressway	left tube: 8,402m, right tube 8,438m
Zheduoshan Tunnel (折多山隧道)	Sichuan	8.427 km (5.236 mi)	2024	2x2	G42_{18} Ya'an-Yecheng Expressway; China National Highway G318	
Jinkouhe Tunnel (金口河隧道)	Sichuan	8.400 km (5.220 mi)	2022	2x2	Emeishan-Hanyuan Expressway	
Wulaofeng Tunnel (五老峰隧道)	Yunnan	8.360 km (5.2 mi)	2022	2x2	Jianshui-Yuanyang Expressway	left tube: 8,360m, right tube: 8,305m
Yinggeling Tunnel (鹦哥岭隧道)	Hainan	8.282 km (5.1 mi)	u/c	2x2	Shiyun-Baisha Expressway	left tube: 8,282m, right tube: 8,260m
Dapingshan Tunnel (大坪山隧道)	Hubei	8.263 km (5.1 mi)	2014	2x2	S63 Hubei Expressway	left tube: 8,263m right tube:8,242m
Shimen Tunnel (石门隧道)	Shaanxi	8.262 km (5.1 mi)	2017	2x3	G85 Yinchuan–Kunming Expressway	left tube 8,262m, right tube 8,247m
Ningnan Tunnel (宁南隧道)	Sichuan	8.258 km (5.1 mi)	u/c	2x2	G42_{16} Chengdu-Lijiang Expressway	left tube 8,258m, right tube 8,245m
Qilinguan Tunnel (麒麟观隧道)	Hubei	8.225 km (5.1 mi)	2025	2x2	G59 Hohhot–Beihai Expressway	left tube: 8,215m right tube:8,225m
Bangfu Tunnel (帮福隧道)	Yunnan	8.200 km (5.1 mi)	u/c	2x2	Yongde-Mengjian Expressway	left tube: 8,200m, right tube: 8,178m
Huayingshan Tunnel (华蓥山隧道)	Sichuan	8.168 km (5.1 mi)	2017	2x2	G55_{15} Zhangjiajie-Nanchong Expressway	left tube 8,151m, right tube 8,168m
Zhuazi #3 Tunnel (抓子三号隧道)	Sichuan	8.150 km (5.1 mi)	u/c	2x2	G76_{11} Duyun-Shangrila Expressway	left tube 8,150m, right tube 8,030m
Lanjiayan Tunnel (蓝家岩隧道)	Sichuan	8.149 km (5.1 mi)	2022	1x2	China National Highway G545	
Yeheshan Tunnel (野河山隧道)	Shaanxi	8.135 km (5.1 mi)	2025	2x2	S25 Shaanxi Lingyou Famen Expressway	
Siguxi Tunnel (斯古溪隧道)	Sichuan	8.129 km (5.1 mi)	u/c	2x2	G42_{16} Chengdu-Lijiang Expressway	left tube 8,129m, right tube 8,102m
Shendaoling Tunnel (神道岭隧道)	Shaanxi	8.060 km (5.008 mi)	u/c	2x2	Hancheng-Huanglong Expressway	
Qishan Tunnel (岐山隧道)	Fujian	8.044 km (5.0 mi)	2015	2x3	G55_{15} Zhangjiajie-Nanchong Expressway G15_{17} Puyan Expressway	left tube: 8,039m right tube:8,044m
Wangjiazhai Tunnel (王家寨隧道)	Yunnan	8.040 km (5.0 mi)	2025	2x2	Kunming-Yiliang Expressway	left tube: 8,010m, right tube: 8,040m
Wuhan Lianghu South Lake Tunnel (两湖隧道南湖段)	Hubei	8 km (5.0 mi)	u/c	2x3		
Liangwangshan Tunnel (梁王山隧道)	Yunnan	7.978 km (5.0 mi)	u/c	2x3	Kunming-Yiliang Expressway	left tube: 7,978m, right tube: 7,961m
Songshan Tunnel (松山隧道)	Guangdong	7.970 km (4.952 mi)	2021	2x3	S27 Shaoguan-Xinfeng Expressway	left tube 7,948m, right tube 7,970m
Xueshanliang Tunnel (雪山梁隧道)	Sichuan	7.966 km (4.950 mi)	2018	1x2	Chuanzhusi-Huanglong Highway	elevation 3,400m
Balangshan Tunnel (巴朗山隧道)	Sichuan	7.95 km (4.94 mi)	2016	1x2	Wenchuan-Xiaojin Highway	elevation 3,850m
Ziyang Tunnel (紫阳隧道) (Note: previous name is Mixiliang Tunnel （米溪梁隧道 ）)	Shaanxi	7.938 km (4.932 mi)	2010	2x2	G65 Baotou–Maoming Expressway	
Kuocangshan Tunnel (括苍山隧道)	Zhejiang	7.930 km (4.927 mi)	2008	2x2	S26 Zhejiang Zhuyong Expressway	Left tube: 7,930m, Right tube: 7,870m
Wunüfeng Tunnel (五女峰隧道)	Jilin	7.930 km (4.927 mi)	2019	2	G11_{12} Ji'an-Shuangliao Expressway	Left tube: 7,930m, Right tube: 7,871m
Maluanshan Tunnel (马峦山隧道)	Guangdong	7.904 km (4.911 mi)	2021	2x3	Ping-Yan Expressway	Left tube: 7,899m, Right tube: 7,904m
Beiling Tunnel (北岭隧道)	Fujian	7.860 km (4.884 mi)	2023	2x3	Fuzhou North 2nd Corridor	
Nanyanshan Tunnel (南岩山隧道)	Zhejiang	7.833 km (4.867 mi)	u/c	2x3	Yiwu-Longquan-Qingyuan Expressway	
Zhushanhu Tunnel (竺山湖隧道)	Jiangsu	7.81 km (4.85 mi)	2024	2x3	Jiangsu S341 Highway	
Dongshan Tunnel (东山隧道)	Shanxi	7.81 km (4.85 mi)	2024	2x2	Shanxi S66 Fenyang-Shilou Expressway	Left tube: 7,730m, Right tube: 7,810m
Jiaozhou Bay Tunnel (胶州湾海底隧道)	Shandong	7.8 km (4.8 mi)	2011	2x3		2 tubes
Shanghai North Corridor West Tunnel (北横通道西段隧道)	Shanghai	7.789 km (4.8 mi)	2021	2x3	Shanghai 北横通道	
Yangzong Tunnel (阳宗隧道)	Yunnan	7.770 km (4.8 mi)	u/c	2x3	Kunming-Yiliang Expressway	
Qiushan Tunnel (秋山隧道)	Shaanxi	7.670 km (4.766 mi)	2020	2x2	G69_{11} Ankang-Laifeng Expressway	Left tube: 7,654m, Right tube: 7,670m
Qiganshan Tunnel (旗杆山隧道)	Chongqing	7.656 km (4.757 mi)	2022	2x2	G69 Yinchuan–Baise Expressway	Left tube: 7,636m, Right tube: 7,656m
Fangdoushan Tunnel (方斗山隧道)	Chongqing	7.605 km (4.726 mi)	2007	2x2	G50 Shanghai–Chongqing Expressway	left tube: 7,605m, right tube: 7,567m
Cangling Tunnel (苍岭隧道)	Zhejiang	7.605 km (4.726 mi)	2009	2x2	S28 Zhejiang Taijin Expressway	left tube: 7,536m, right tube: 7,605m
Lichitian Tunnel (梨赤田隧道)	Sichuan	7.604 km (4.7 mi)	u/c	2x2	G42_{16} Chengdu-Lijiang Expressway	
Jiudingshan Tunnel (九顶山隧道)	Yunnan	7.597 km (4.721 mi)	2022	2x3	G56_{21} Kunming-Dali Expressway	left tube 7,597m, right tube 7,560m
Mingtangshan Tunnel (明堂山隧道)	Anhui	7.548 km (4.690 mi)	2015	2x2	S18 Anhui Yuewu Expressway	left tube: 7,548m, right tube: 7,531m
Wuliangshan Tunnel (无量山隧道)	Yunnan	7.528 km (4.7 mi)	u/c	2x2	G56_{12} Dali-Lincang Expressway	
Aerjinshan Tunnel (阿尔金山隧道)	Gansu	7.527 km (4.677 mi)	2022	2x2	G3011 Liuyuan–Golmud Expressway	left tube: 7,525m, right tube: 7,527m, Elevation: 3,340m
Shimenya Tunnel (石门垭隧道)	Hubei	7.524 km (4.675 mi)	2014	2x2	G42 Shanghai–Chengdu Expressway	left tube: 7,524m right tube:7,493m
Caochiping Tunnel (草池坪隧道)	Hubei	7.515 km (4.7 mi)	u/c	2x2	G59_{12} Fangxian-Wufeng Expressway	
Xiangda Tunnel (象达隧道)	Yunnan	7.467 km (4.6 mi)	u/c	2x2	Ruili-Menglian Expressway	
Liaozi Tunnel (蓼子隧道)	Chongqing	7.447 km (4.627 mi)	2022	2x2	G69 Yinchuan–Baise Expressway	
Aikeng Tunnel (艾肯隧道)	Xinjiang	7.445 km (4.626 mi)	u/c	2x2	China National Highway 218	left tube: 7,445m right tube:7,405m
Zimuyan Tunnel (子母岩隧道)	Chongqing - Guizhou	7.399 km (4.598 mi)	2025	2x2	G65 Baotou–Maoming Expressway	left tube: 7,390m right tube:7,399m
Jinhuashan Tunnel (金华山隧道)	Zhejiang	7.388 km (4.591 mi)	2020	2x2	G25 Changchun–Shenzhen Expressway	
Nanjing Dinghuaimen Yangtze River Tunnel (南京定淮门长江隧道)	Jiangsu	7.363 km (4.575 mi)	2016	2x2x2		North tube: 7,014m, South tube: 7,363m
Motianling Tunnel (摩天岭隧道)	Chongqing	7.353 km (4.569 mi)	2010	2x2	G42 Shanghai–Chengdu Expressway	left tube: 7,280m, right tube: 7,535m
Canglongxia Tunnel (苍龙峡隧道)	Shaanxi	7.350 km (4.567 mi)	2022	2x2	Ningshaan-Shiquan Expressway	
Fangdoushan Tunnel (方斗山隧道)	Chongqing	7.310 km (4.542 mi)	2013	2x2	G5021 Shizhu-Chongqing Expressway	left tube: 7,310m, right tube: 7,285m
Dagangshan Tunnel (大岗山隧道)	Sichuan	7.309 km (4.542 mi)	2024	2x2	Luding-Shimian Expressway	left tube: 7,309m, right tube: 7,286m
Dapingshan Tunnel (大坪山隧道)	Zhejiang	7.305 km (4.539 mi)	u/c	2x2	Cangnan-Taishun Expressway	
Aizigou Tunnel (矮子沟隧道)	Sichuan	7.246 km (4.502 mi)	2014	2x1	Kala Yangfanggou Hydroelectricity Power Station Road	left tube: 7,246m, right tube: 7,223m
Yunwushan Tunnel (云雾山隧道)	Shaanxi	7.209 km (4.479 mi)	2022	2x2	Ningshaan-Shiquan Expressway	left tube: 7,185m, right tube: 7,209m
Taiyangping Tunnel (太阳坪隧道)	Guizhou	7.206 km (4.478 mi)	2024	2x2	Jinsha-Huairen-Tongzi Expressway	
Huoshan Tunnel (火山隧道)	Sichuan	7.197 km (4.472 mi)	2024	2x2	G42_{16} Chengdu-Lijiang Expressway	left tube: 7,145m, right tube: 7,197m
Luotuoshan Tunnel (骆驼山隧道)	Shanxi	7.185 km (4.5 mi)	2024	2x3	G20_{03} Taiyuan Ring Expressway	
Xianfengling #1 Tunnel (仙峰岭一号隧道)	Jilin	7.153 km (4.445 mi)	2020	2x2	G12_{21} Yanji-Changchun Expressway	left tube: 7,151m, right tube: 7,153m
Gewa Tunnel (格瓦隧道)	Yunnan	7.148 km (4.442 mi)	u/c	2x2	G76_{11} Duyun-Shangri-la Expressway	left tube: 7,145m, right tube: 7,148m
Lizhuang Tunnel (里庄隧道)	Sichuan	7.147 km (4.441 mi)	2008	1x2	Jingping Hydroelectricity Power Station Road	
Dahuashan Tunnel (大华山隧道)	Yunnan	7.130 km (4.430 mi)	u/c	2x2	G76_{11} Duyun-Shangri-la Expressway	left tube: 7,130m, right tube: 7,100m
Baiyun Tunnel (白云隧道)	Chongqing	7.120 km (4.424 mi)	2008	2x2	G65 Baotou–Maoming Expressway	left tube: 7,089m right tube:7,120m
Yimoluo Tunnel (伊莫洛隧道)	Sichuan	7.087 km (4.404 mi)	u/c	2x2	G42_{16} Chengdu-Lijiang Expressway	left tube: 7,087m right tube:7,084m
Dayan Tunnel (大岩隧道)	Sichuan	7.081 km (4.400 mi)	2022	2x2	Emeishan-Hanyuan Expressway	
Que'ershan Tunnel (雀儿山隧道)	Sichuan	7.079 km (4.399 mi)	2017	1x2	National Highway 317	Elevation: 4,378m above the sea level
Shangluo Tunnel (上罗隧道)	Sichuan	7.066 km (4.391 mi)	2023	2x2	Yinbing-Weixing Expressway	left tube: 7,066m, right tube: 7,032m
Taining Tunnel (泰宁隧道)	Fujian	7.039 km (4.374 mi)	2013	2x2	Jianning-Taining Expressway	left tube: 7,039m, right tube: 7,007m
Qionglaishan Tunnel (邛崃山隧道)	Sichuan	7.030 km (4.368 mi)	2024	1x2	S450 Sichuan Provincial Highway	
Wuhan East Lake Tunnel (东湖隧道)	Hubei	7.018 km (4.361 mi)	2015	2x3	East Lake Corridor	
Caoguoshan Tunnel (草果山隧道)	Yunnan	7.005 km (4.353 mi)	2022	2x2	Manhao-Jinping Expressway	
Lishan Tunnel (李山隧道)	Zhejiang	6.998 km (4.348 mi)	u/c	2x2	Qingtian-Wencheng Expressway	
Juebashan Tunnel (觉巴山隧道)	Xizang	6.995 km (4.346 mi)	2024	1x2	National Highway 318	
Yinpingshan Tunnel (银瓶山隧道)	Guangdong	6.963 km (4.327 mi)	2013	2x3	G0422 Wuhan-Shenzhen Expressway	left tube: 6,959m, right tube: 6,9563m
Xuefengshan Tunnel (雪峰山隧道)	Hunan	6.956 km (4.322 mi)	2007	2x2	G60 Shanghai–Kunming Expressway	left tube: 6,946m, right tube: 6,956m
Egan Tunnel (鄂赣隧道)	Hubei, Jiangxi	6.948 km (4.317 mi)	2012	2x2	G45 Daqing–Guangzhou Expressway	left tube: 6,896m, right tube: 6,948m
Detuo Tunnel (得妥隧道)	Sichuan	6.940 km (4.312 mi)	2025	2x2	Luding-Shimian Expressway	left tube: 6,932m, right tube: 6,940m
Dulagezan Tunnel (独拉格咱隧道)	Yunnan	6.930 km (4.306 mi)	u/c	2x1	S226 Provincial Road	left tube: 6,930m, right tube: 6,887m
Tongsheng Tunnel (通省隧道)	Hubei	6.900 km (4.287 mi)	2015	2x2	G59 Hohhot–Beihai Expressway	left tube: 6,900m, right tube: 6,874m
Daliangshan Tunnel (大亮山隧道)	Yunnan	6.900 km (4.287 mi)	2023	2x2	G56_{18} Lincang-Qingshuihe Expressway	left tube: 6,900m, right tube: 6,870m
Shanghai North Corridor East Tunnel (北横通道东段隧道)	Shanghai	6.9 km (4.3 mi)	2024	2x3	Shanghai 北横通道	
Fenshuiling Tunnel (分水岭隧道)	Hebei	6.891 km (4.282 mi)	2013	2x3	G95 Capital Region Ring Expressway	left tube: 6,891m, right tube: 6,798m
Longlongba Tunnel (竜竜坝隧道)	Yunnan	6.875 km (4.272 mi)	u/c	2x2	Simao-Jiangcheng Expressway	
Wushaoling No. 2 Tunnel (乌鞘岭二号隧道)	Gansu	6.868 km (4.268 mi)	2013	2x2	G30 Lianyungang–Khorgas Expressway	left tube: 6,848m, right tube: 6,868m
Quchiwan Tunnel (曲尺湾隧道)	Hubei	6.833 km (4.246 mi)	2021	2x2	Baokang-Shennongjia Expressway	Left tube: 6,777m, Right tube: 6,833m
Shenzhong Corridor Under-sea Tunnel (深中通道海底隧道)	Guangdong	6.830 km (4.244 mi)	2024	2x4	G25_{18} Shenzhen-Cenxi Expressway	world widest undersea tunnel
Jinggangshan Tunnel (井冈山隧道)	Jiangxi	6.810 km (4.232 mi)	2013	2x2	S50 Jiangxi Taijing Expressway	left tube: 6,810m, right tube: 6,806m
Yanqian Tunnel (岩前隧道)	Fujian	6.795 km (4.222 mi)	2015	2x2	G3 Beijing–Taipei Expressway	left tube: 6,795m, right tube: 6,785m
Xiaopotou Tunnel (小坡头隧道)	Yunnan	6.795 km (4.222 mi)	2025	2x2	Huize-Qiaojia Expressway	left tube: 6,795m, right tube: 6,720m
Paomashan #2 Tunnel (跑马山二号隧道)	Sichuan	6.785 km (4.216 mi)	u/c	2x2	G42_{18} Ya'an-Yecheng Expressway	Left tube: 6,785m, Right tube: 6,660m
Maojingba Tunnel (茅荆坝隧道)	Hebei, Inner Mongolia	6.776 km (4.210 mi)	2013	2x2	G45 Daqing–Guangzhou Expressway	left tube: 6,752m, right tube:6,776m
Sizhouling Tunnel (泗洲岭隧道) (Note: previous name is Xizhouling Tunnel (西周岭隧道))	Zhejiang	6.765 km (4.204 mi)	2013	2x2	G40_{12} Liyang-Ningde Expressway	left tube: 6,750m, right tube: 6,765m
Xishanyin Tunnel (西山营隧道)	Yunnan	6.758 km (4.199 mi)	2025	2x3	Sanshui-Qingshui Expressway	
Muzuo Tunnel (木座隧道)	Sichuan	6.744 km (4.191 mi)	2022	2x2	G85_{13} Pingliang-Mianyang Expressway	
Baihetan Tunnel (白鹤滩隧道)	Sichuan	6.714 km (4.172 mi)	2025	2x2	G42_{16} Chengdu-Lijiang Expressway	left tube: 6,644m, right tube: 6,714m
Baizhishan Tunnel (白芷山隧道)	Chongqing	6.710 km (4.169 mi)	2013	1x2	Chengwan Highway	
Yunwushan Tunnel(云雾山隧道)	Hubei	6.708 km (4.168 mi)	2008	2x2	G50 Shanghai–Chongqing Expressway	left tube: 6,708m, right tube: 6,693m
Wulaoshan Tunnel (五老山隧道)	Yunnan	6.685 km (4.154 mi)	2021	2x2	G56_{15} Tianbao-Houqiao Expressway	left tube: 6,685m, right tube: 6,640m
Dulongjiang Tunnel (独龙江隧道)	Yunnan	6.680 km (4.151 mi)	2014	1x2	Dulongjiang Highway	
Hongyansi Tunnel (红岩寺隧道)	Hubei	6.678 km (4.150 mi)	2015	2x2	G59 Hohhot–Beihai Expressway	left tube: 6,678m, right tube: 6,639m
Xiaba Tunnel (下坝隧道)	Sichuan	6.678 km (4.150 mi)	u/c	2x2	G42_{16} Chengdu-Lijiang Expressway	
Yangjiao Tunnel (羊角隧道)	Chongqing	6.676 km (4.148 mi)	2009	2x2	G65 Baotou–Maoming Expressway	left tube: 6,656m, right tube: 6,676m
Lüjialiang Tunnel (吕家梁隧道)	Chongqing	6.664 km (4.141 mi)	2009	2x2	G50 Shanghai–Chongqing Expressway	left tube: 6,664m, right tube: 6,663m
Hong Kong-Zhuhai-Macau Bridge Undersea Tunnel (港珠澳大桥海底隧道)	Guangdong	6.648 km (4.131 mi)	2018	2x3	G94 Pearl River Delta Ring Expressway	
Wujialiang Tunnel (吴家梁隧道)	Chongqing	6.618 km (4.112 mi)	2022	2x2	G69 Yinchuan–Baise Expressway	left tube: 6,618m, right tube: 6,592m
Wulong Tunnel (武隆隧道)	Chongqing	6.618 km (4.112 mi)	2025	2x2	Yuxiang 2nd Expressway	
Niujingshan Tunnel (牛金山隧道)	Shanxi	6.612 km (4.1 mi)	2024	2x3	G20_{03} Taiyuan Ring Expressway	
YinmaanTunnel (饮马鞍隧道)	Beijing	6.611 km (4.108 mi)	2024	2x3	S3701 Beijing-Yuxian Expressway	left tube: 6,572m, right tube: 6,611m
Yemajian #1 Tunnel (叶麻尖一号隧道)	Zhejiang	6.602 km (4.102 mi)	2022	2x2	G40_{12} Liyang-Ningde Expressway	left tube: 6,602m, right tube: 6,517m
Dabieshan Tunnel (大别山隧道)	Anhui - Henan	6.5928 km (4.0966 mi)	2025	2x2	G42_{22} He County–Xiangyang Expressway	
Huangjiaoping Tunnel (黄角坪隧道)	Sichuan	6.586 km (4.092 mi)	u/c	2x2	G42_{16} Chengdu-Lijiang Expressway	left tube: 6,571m, right tube: 6,586m
Dazhuang Tunnel (大庄隧道)	Hubei	6.570 km (4.082 mi)	2016	2x2	G65_{12} Enshi–Guangyuan Expressway	left tube: 6,515m, right tube: 6,570m
Buran Tunnel (布然隧道)	Xinjiang	6.558 km (4.075 mi)	u/c	2x2	China National Highway G341	left tube: 6,558m, right tube: 6,550m
Mingyueshan Tunnel (明月山隧道)	Chongqing, Sichuan	6.557 km (4.074 mi)	2008	2x2	G42 Shanghai–Chengdu Expressway	left tube: 6,557m, right tube: 6,555m
Donggongshan Tunnel (洞宫山隧道)	Fujian	6.5565 km (4.0740 mi)	2012	2x2	G15_{14} Ningde-Shangrao Expressway	
Xinglingjing Tunnel (西凌井隧道)	Shanxi	6.555 km (4.073 mi)	2011	2x2	S50 Shanxi Pinglin Expressway	left tube: 6,555m, right tube: 6,555m
Tianlongshan Tunnel (天龙山隧道)	Fujian	6.551 km (4.071 mi)	2015	2x2	G3 Beijing–Taipei Expressway	left tube: 6,521m, right tube: 6,551m
Huayingshan Tunnel (华蓥山隧道)	Chongqing	6.540 km (4.064 mi)	u/c	2x2	Guang'an-Linshui Rapid Road	
Leijiashan Tunnel (雷家山隧道)	Hunan	6.540 km (4.064 mi)	2025	2x2	G55_{15} Zhangjiajie-Nanchong Expressway	
Muzhaling Tunnel (木札岭隧道)	Henan	6.537 km (4.062 mi)	2020	2x2	Zhengzhou-Luanchuan Expressway	left tube: 6,521m, right tube: 6,537m
Luoyanshan Tunnel (罗岩山隧道)	Fujian	6.534 km (4.060 mi)	2017	2x2	G25_{17} Shaxian-Xiamen Expressway	
Jiaohuan Tunnel (郊环隧道)	Shanghai	6.521 km (4.1 mi))	2019	2x3	G15_{03} Shanghai Ring Expressway	left tube 6,521 m, right tube 6,486 m
Jinmen Tunnel (金门隧道)	Guangdong	6.492 km (4.034 mi)	2018	2x2	G78 Shantou-Kunming Expressway	
Xiakou Tunnel (峡口隧道)	Hubei	6.487 km (4.031 mi)	2014	2x2	G42 Shanghai–Chengdu Expressway	
Chuntianmen Tunnel (春天门隧道)	Chongqing	6.476 km (4.024 mi)	2020	2x2	Nanchuan-Liangjiang Expressway	
Xiaolongmen Tunnel (小龙门隧道)	Beijing-Hebei	6.476 km (4.024 mi)	2024	2x2	S37_{01} Beijing-Yuxian Expressway	
Baiyunshan Tunnel (白云山隧道)	Chongqing	6.458 km (4.013 mi)	2025	2x2	Yuxiang 2nd Expressway	
Wufu Tunnel (五福隧道)	Chongqing	6.450 km (4.008 mi)	u/c	2x2	G50_{12} Enshi-Guangyuan Expressway	
Baolongping Tunnel (保龙坪隧道)	Chongqing, Sichuan	6.450 km (4.008 mi)	u/c	2x2	Chongqing-Chishui-Xuyong Expressway	
Jiangyin-Jingjiang Yangtse River Tunnel (江阴靖江长江隧道)	Jiangsu	6.445 km (4.005 mi)	u/c	2x3	S229 Provincial Road	
Zangshan Tunnel (藏山隧道)	Shanxi	6.440 km (4.002 mi)	2016	2x2	S45 Shanxi Tianli Expressway	left tube: 6410m right tube:6440m
Taihe Tunnel (泰和隧道)	Yunnan	6.420 km (3.989 mi)	2021	2x2	G56_{15} Tianbao-Houqiao Expressway	Left tube: 6,420m, Right tube: 6,380m
Gaoyuzui Tunnel (高峪咀隧道)	Shanxi	6.416 km (3.987 mi)	u/c	2x2	Xixiang-Qikou Expressway	Left tube: 6,416m, Right tube: 6,400m
Yuejin Tunnel (跃进隧道)	Sichuan	6.410 km (3.983 mi)	u/c	1x2	China National Highway G662	
Jiuyishan Tunnel (九嶷山隧道)	Hunan-Guangdong	6.400 km (3.977 mi)	2014	2x2	G55 Erenhot-Guangzhou Expressway	left tube: 6,395m, right tube: 6,400m
Wuxi Tunnel (巫溪隧道)	Chongqing	6.400 km (3.977 mi)	2023	2x2	G69_{11} Ankang-Laifeng Expressway	left tube: 6,366m, right tube: 6,400m
Yayang Tunnel (雅阳隧道)	Zhejiang	6.381 km (3.965 mi)	u/c	2x2	Cangnan-Taishun Expressway	
Hongtu Tunnel (鸿图隧道)	Guangdong	6.350 km (3.946 mi)	2020	2x2	Dapu-Fengshun-Wuhua Expressway	left tube: 6,336m, right tube: 6,350m
Baiyunshan Tunnel (白云山隧道)	Henan	6.347 km (3.944 mi)	2020	2x2	Zhengzhou-Luanchuan Expressway	
Wushaoling No4 Tunnel (乌鞘岭四号隧道)	Gansu	6.333 km (3.935 mi)	2013	2x2	G30 Lianyungang–Khorgas Expressway	left tube: 6,314m, right tube: 6,333m
Shanchahua Tunnel (山茶花隧道)	Sichuan	6.328 km (3.932 mi) (Note: left tube: 6,284m, right tube: 6,328m)	2023	2x2	Suining-Yichang-Bijie Expressway	
Yanlai Tunnel (燕来隧道)	Guangxi	6.325 km (3.930 mi)	2022	2x2	Nandan-Tian'e Expressway	left tube: 6,297 m, right tube: 6,325 m
Jiaoding Tunnel (轿顶隧道)	Yunnan	6.318 km (3.926 mi)	2020	2x2	Zhaotong-Leshan Expressway	left tube 6,318 m, right tube 6,307 m
Putaoshan Tunnel (葡萄山隧道)	Chongqing	6.308 km (3.920 mi) (Note: 6.308 km + 6.280 km)	2009	2x2	G65 Baotou–Maoming Expressway	left tube: 6,308 m, right tube: 6,280 m
Haicang Undersea Tunnel (海沧海底隧道)	Fujian	6.306 km (3.9 mi)	2021	2x3		2 tubes
Wuchalu Tunnel (五岔路隧道)	Yunnan	6.290 km (3.908 mi)	2024	2x2	S59 Yunnan Mangshi-Lianghe Expressway	
Yaocongshan Tunnel (药丛山隧道)	Sichuan	6.280 km (3.902 mi)	2023	2x2	G8513 Pingliang-Mianyang Expressway	
Jiuling Tunnel (九岭隧道)	Hubei	6.264 km (3.892 mi)	u/c	2x2	G59_{12} Fangxian-Wufeng Expressway	
Helinyakou Tunnel (黑林垭口隧道)	Qinghai	6.260 km (3.9 mi)	2024	2x2	China National Highway G341	
Fenshuiling Tunnel (分水岭隧道)	Hubei	6.254 km (3.886 mi)	2021	2x2	Baokang-Shennongjia Expressway	left tube: 6,201 m, right tube: 6,254 m
Maanshan Tunnel (马鞍山隧道)	Sichuan	6.252 km (3.885 mi)	u/c	2x2	G42_{16} Chengdu-Lijiang Expressway	left tube: 6,244 m, right tube: 6,252 m
Mangshi Tunnel (芒市隧道)	Yunnan	6.250 km (3.884 mi)	2024	2x2	Mangshi-Lianghe Expressway	left tube: 6,250 m, right tube: 6,185 m
Mawan Undersea Tunnel (妈湾海底隧道)	Guangdong	6.247 km (3.882 mi)	2025	2x3	Mawan Cross-sea Corridor	
Jiugongshan #2 Tunnel (九宫山二号隧道)	Jiangxi-Hubei	6.210 km (3.859 mi)	u/c	2x2	Xianning-Wuning Expressway	left tube: 6,210m, right tube: 6,195m
Shuangfeng Tunnel (双峰隧道)	Zhejiang	6.187 km (3.844 mi)	2010	2x2	S26 Zhejiang Zhuji-Yongjia Expressway	left tube: 6,142m, right tube: 6,187m
Qinghe Tunnel (清河隧道)	Yunnan	6.185 km (3.843 mi)	2021	2x2	Zhaotong-Luzhou Expressway	left tube: 6,185m, right tube: 6,130m
Jixingling Tunnel (鸡心岭隧道)	Chongqing, Shaanxi	6.181 km (3.841 mi)	2023	2x2	G69_{11} Ankang-Laifeng Expressway	left tube: 6,181m, right tube: 6,150m
Chunmushan Tunnel (椿木山隧道)	Hunan	6.158 km (3.826 mi)	2023	2x2	Zhijiang-Tongren Expressway	left tube: 6,147m, right tube: 6,158m
Guantian Tunnel (官田隧道)	Fujian	6.151 km (3.8 mi)	2015	2x2	G76 Xiamen–Chengdu Expressway	
Qinling II Tunnel (秦岭二号隧道)	Shaanxi	6.145 km (3.818 mi)	2007	2x2	G5 Beijing–Kunming Expressway	left tube: 6125m right tube:6145m
Qinling I Tunnel (秦岭一号隧道)	Shaanxi	6.144 km (3.818 mi)	2007	2x2	G5 Beijing–Kunming Expressway	left tube: 6102m right tube:6144m
Ruhamo Tunnel (如哈莫隧道)	Sichuan	6.135 km (3.8 mi)	u/c	2x2	G76_{11} Duyun-Shangrila Expressway	
Dabashan Tunnel (大巴山隧道)	Shaanxi, Sichuan	6.123 km (3.805 mi)	2012	2x2	G65 Baotou–Maoming Expressway	left tube: 6,123m, right tube: 6,115m
Yangbajing #2 Tunnel (羊八井二号隧道)	Xizang	6.118 km (3.802 mi)	2020	2x2	G6 Beijing–Lhasa Expressway	Elevation: 4,300m 800m deep
Zhongxing Tunnel (中兴隧道)	Chongqing	6.105 km (3.793 mi)	2009	2x2	G65 Baotou–Maoming Expressway	left tube: 6,105m, right tube: 6,082m
Yuntong Tunnel (运通隧道)	Beijing	6.100 km (3.790 mi)	2021	2x3		
Elizhai Tunnel (厄哩寨隧道)	Sichuan	6.063 km (3.767 mi)	2025	2x2	G85_{13} Pingliang-Mianyang Expressway	
Hetaoping Tunnel (核桃坪隧道)	Sichuan	6.063 km (3.767 mi)	u/c	2x2	G42_{16} Chengdu-Lijiang Expressway	
Daliangshan Tunnel (大梁山隧道)	Shanxi	6.058 km (3.764 mi)	2014	2x2	S45 Tianzhen-Licheng Expressway	left tube: 6,015m, right tube: 6,058m
Tiantangxia Tunnel (铁堂峡隧道)	Gansu	6.051 km (3.760 mi)	2015	2x2	G7011 Shiyan–Tianshui Expressway	left tube: 6,051m, right tube: 6,043m
Xiang'an Undersea Tunnel (翔安海底隧道)	Fujian	6.050 km (3.759 mi)	2010	2x3		2 tubes
Caoziping Tunnel (草籽坪隧道)	Sichuan	6.050 km (3.759 mi)	u/c	2x2	G76_{11} Duyun-Shangri-la Expressway Muli Branch	
Qilianshan #2 Tunnel (祁连山二号隧道)	Qinghai	6.044 km (3.8 mi)	2024	2x2	China National Highway G569	left tube: 6,044m, right tube: 5,943m elevation: 3,500m
Fengshuiguan Tunnel (分水关隧道)	Fujian-Jiangxi	6.043 km (3.755 mi)	2013	2x2	G15_{14} Ningde-Shangrao Expressway	left tube: 5,946.5m, right tube: 6,043.42m
Wusihe Tunnel (乌斯河隧道)	Sichuan	6.027 km (3.745 mi)	2022	2x2	Emeishan-Hanyuan Expressway	
Tiefengshan II Tunnel (铁峰山2号隧道)	Chongqing	6.020 km (3.741 mi)	2006	2x2	G50_{12} Enshi-Guangyuan Expressway	left tube: 6,010m, right tube: 6,020m
Yanglushan Tunnel (羊鹿山隧道)	Chongqing	6.015 km (3.738 mi)	2013	2x2	G5021 Shizhu-Chongqing Expressway	left tube: 6,002m, right tube: 6,015m
Qingyunshan Tunnel (青云山隧道)	Guangdong	6.01 km (3.7 mi)	2018	2x2	G04_{22} Wuhan-Shenzhen Expressway	left tube: 5,910m, right tube: 6,010m
Shigushan Tunnel (石鼓山隧道)	Fujian	6.005 km (3.731 mi)	2012	2x3	G15_{23} Ningbo-Dongguan Expressway	
Nantianmen Tunnel (南天门隧道)	Yunnan	5.997 km (3.726 mi)	2021	2x2	Zhaotong-Luzhou Expressway	left tube: 5,973m, right tube: 5,997m
Huanglianping Tunnel (黄连坪隧道)	Yunnan	5.972 km (3.711 mi)	2020	2x2	Zhaotong-Leshan Expressway	left tube 5,972 m, right tube 5,963 m
Chenjiashan Tunnel (陈家山隧道)	Zhejiang	5.96 km (3.70 mi)	2020	2x2	Hangzhou-Shaoxin-Taizhou Expressway	
Zhawu Tunnel (扎务隧道)	Yunnan	5.950 km (3.697 mi)	u/c	2x2	Ruilin-Menglian Expressway	left tube 5,950 m, right tube 5,915 m
Hongyashan Tunnel (红崖山隧道)	Yunnan	5.945 km (3.694 mi)	2023	2x2	Duyun-Shangri-La Expressway	left tube 5,905 m, right tube 5,945 m
Wulongguan Tunnel (五龙观隧道)	Hubei	5.943 km (3.693 mi)	u/c	2x2	G59_{12} Fangxian-Wufeng Expressway	
Lehua Tunnel (乐化隧道)	Qinghai	5.933 km (3.7 mi)	2024	2x2	China National Highway G319	
Qipanliang Tunnel (棋盘梁隧道)	Hebei	5.898 km (3.665 mi)	2019	2x2	S38_{01} Beijing-Chongli Expressway	left tube 5,874 m, right tube 5,898 m
Fenghuangling Tunnel (凤凰岭隧道)	Shanxi	5.897 km (3.664 mi)	2011	2x2	S46 Shanxi Wubao Expressway	left tube: 5,897m, right tube: 5,773.5m
Yuliao Tunnel (渔寮隧道)	Zhejiang	5.870 km (3.647 mi)	2019	2x3	G15_{23} Ningbo-Dongguan Expressway	
Daiyunshan Tunnel (戴云山隧道)	Fujian	5.850 km (3.635 mi)	2017	2x2	G25_{17} Xiamen-Shaxian Expressway	left tube: 5,850m, right tube: 5,837m
Lianghekou Tunnel (两河口隧道)	Sichuan	5.840 km (3.629 mi)	2010	1x2	Lianghekou Dam Route 1	
Jiangjunshi Tunnel (石峡隧道)	Beijing	5.833 km (3.624 mi)	2018	2x2	S38_{01} Beijing-Chongli Expressway	left tube: 5,7465m, right tube: 5,520m
Jiangjunshi Tunnel (将军石隧道)	Sichuan-Gansu	5.805 km (3.607 mi)	2012	2x2	G75 Lanzhou–Haikou Expressway	left tube: 5,804m, right tube: 5,805m
Lianchengshan Tunnel (连城山隧道)	Shaanxi	5.798 km (3.603 mi)	2017	2x3	G85 Yinchuan–Kunming Expressway	
Baimashan Tunnel (白马山隧道)	Chongqing	5.780 km (3.592 mi)	2025	2x2	Chongqing-Changsha 2nd Expressway	
Caijialiangzi Tunnel (蔡家梁子隧道)	Guizhou	5.773 km (3.587 mi)	2025	2x2	Wong'an Mayan Expressway	
Youcheling Tunnel (油车岭隧道)	Fujian	5.754 km (3.575 mi)	2016	2x3	G15_{23} Ningbo-Dongguan Expressway	left tube: 5,754m, right tube: 5,726m
Yuanbaoshan Tunnel (元宝山隧道)	Sichuan	5.747 km (3.571 mi)	u/c	2x2	G42_{16} Chengdu-Lijiang Expressway	left tube: 5,757m, right tube: 5,739m
Nanping Tunnel (南坪隧道)	Sichuan	5.745 km (3.570 mi)	2024	2x2	G8513 Pingliang-Mianyang Expressway	
Yangliao Tunnel (杨寮隧道)	Guangdong	5.742 km (3.568 mi)	2023	2x2	Xingye Rapid Line	
Zhulinwan Tunnel (竹林湾隧道)	Sichuan	5.741 km (3.567 mi)	u/c	2x2	G42_{16} Chengdu-Lijiang Expressway	
Milashan Tunnel (米拉山隧道)	Xizang	5.727 km (3.559 mi)	2019	2x2	China National Highway G318	left tube: 5,727m, right tube: 5,720m elevation: 4,774m
Ciganyan Tunnel (赐敢岩隧道)	Fujian	5.715 km (3.551 mi)	2015	2x2	G15_{23} Ningbo-Dongguan Expressway	left tube: 5,715m, right tube: 5,670m
Taohuatan Tunnel (桃花潭隧道)	Anhui	5.706 km (3.546 mi)	2021	2x2	Chaohu-Huangshan Expressway	left tube: 5,682m, right tube: 5,706m
Qingniling Tunnel (青泥岭隧道)	Gansu	5.694 km (3.538 mi)	2015	2x2	G7011 Shiyan–Tianshui Expressway	left tube: 5,464m, right tube: 5,694m
Daxingxiang Tunnel (大兴乡隧道)	Yunnan	5.690 km (3.5 mi)	2023	2x2	Lincang-Qingshuihe Expressway	left tube: 5,672m, right tube: 5,690m
Gaoersi Tunnel (高尔寺隧道)	Sichuan	5.682 km (3.531 mi)	2015	1x2	China National Highway G318	
Jieling Tunnel (界岭隧道)	Hubei	5.681 km (3.530 mi)	2014	2x2	G42 Shanghai–Chengdu Expressway	left tube: 5,653m, right tube: 5,681m
Yin'erling Tunnel (营尔岭隧道)	Hebei	5.6773 km (3.5277 mi)	2019	2x2	G18 Rongcheng–Wuhai Expressway	left tube: 5,656m, right tube: 5,677m
Sibaoshan Tunnel (四宝山隧道)	Sichuan	5.660 km (3.517 mi)	2022	2x2	Emeishan-Hanyuan Expressway	left tube: 5,649m, right tube: 5,660m
Zijing Tunnel (紫荆隧道)	Sichuan	5.656 km (3.514 mi)	2016	1x2	China National Highway G350	
Mengshan Tunnel (蒙山隧道)	Shanxi	5.655 km (3.514 mi)	2013	2x2	S45 Shanxi Tianli Expressway	
Yongfutun Tunnel (永福屯隧道)	Guangxi	5.647 km (3.509 mi)	2021	2x2	S22 Guilin-Hechi Expressway	left tube: 5,640m, right tube: 5,647m
Dafengding Tunnel (大风顶隧道)	Sichuan	5.646 km (3.508 mi)	2025	2x2	Leshan-Xichang Expressway	
Damiao Tunnel (大庙隧道)	Hebei	5.645 mi (9.085 km)	2013	2x2	G45 Daqing–Guangzhou Expressway	left tube: 5,635m, right tube: 5,645m
Guixi Tunnel (桂溪隧道)	Sichuan	5.645 km (3.508 mi)	2023	2x2	G8513 Pingliang-Mianyang Expressway	
Zhengyuan Tunnel (镇沅隧道)	Yunnan	5.636 km (3.502 mi)	2021	2x2	G56_{15} Tianbao-Houqiao Expressway	
Guolao Tunnel (果老隧道)	Gansu	5.627 km (3.496 mi)	2019	2x2	Liangdang-Huxian Expressway	left tube: 5,627m
Motianling Tunnel (摩天岭隧道)	Liaoning	5.625 km (3.495 mi)	2025	2x2	G91_{11} Benxi-Ji'an Expressway	left tube: 5,590m, right tube: 5,625m
Eshanjie Tunnel (鄂陕界隧道)	Hubei, Shaanxi	5.620 km (3.492 mi)	2014	2x2	G7011 Shiyan–Tianshui Expressway	left tube: 5,616m, right tube: 5,620m
Guibin Tunnel (贵宾隧道)	Guangxi	5.620 km (3.492 mi)	2023	2x2	Guangxi S52 Pingnan-Napo Expressway	left tube: 5,620m, right tube: 5,595m
Xianglong Tunnel (香龙隧道)	Chongqing	5.587 km (3.472 mi)	2025	2x2	Chongqing-Changsha Second Expressway	left tube: 5,570m, right tube: 5,587m
Shijiufeng Tunnel (十九峰隧道)	Zhejiang	5.583 km (3.469 mi)	2020	2x2	Hangzhou-Shaoxin-Taizhou Expressway	
Meiguling Tunnel (美菰林隧道)	Fujian	5.580 km (3.467 mi)	2003	2x2	G70 Fuzhou–Yinchuan Expressway	left tube: 5,568m, right tube: 5,580m
Yunzhongshan Tunnel (云中山隧道)	Shanxi	5.575 km (3.464 mi)	2011	2x2	G1812 Cangzhou-Yulin Expressway	left tube: 5,565m, right tube: 5,575m
Lixian Tunnel (理县隧道)	Sichuan	5.570 km (3.461 mi)	2019	2x2	G42_{17} Chengdu-Changdu Expressway	
Lajishan Tunnel (拉脊山隧道)	Qinghai	5.564 km (3.457 mi)	2013	2x1	S101 Qinghai 101 Highway	left tube: 5,530m, right tube: 5,564m elevation: 3,200m
Wenxin #1 Tunnel (文新一号隧道)	Yunnan	5.563 km (3.457 mi)	2021	2x2	G56_{15} Tianbao-Houqiao Expressway	left tube: 5,505m, right tube: 5,563m
Shenzuo Tunnel (神座隧道)	Sichuan	5.556 km (3.452 mi)	2024	2x2	G06_{15} Delingha-Maerkang Expressway	Elevation: >3,300m
Da'nanshan Tunnel (大南山隧道)	Shanxi	5.535 km (3.439 mi)	2012	2x3	G5 Beijing–Kunming Expressway	left tube: 5,535m, right tube: 5,837m
Bingcaowan Tunnel (冰草湾隧道)	Gansu	5.525 km (3.433 mi)	2024	2x2	National Highway 312	left tube: 5,535m, right tube: 5,837m
Lirang Tunnel (礼让隧道)	Chongqing	5.5207 km (3.4304 mi)	2016	2x2	G55_{15} Zhangjiajie-Nanchong Expressway	left tube: 5,518m, right tube: 5,521m
Qingxi Tunnel (青溪隧道)	Sichuan	5.5205 km (3.4303 mi)	2022	2x2	Guangyuan-Pingwu Expressway	left tube: 5,516m, right tube: 5,520.5m
Yushan Tunnel (雩山隧道)	Jiangxi	5.518 km (3.429 mi)	2015	2x2	G60_{11} Nanchang-Shaoguan Expressway	left tube: 5,518m, right tube: 5,510m
Laboleng Tunnel (拉卜楞隧道)	Gansu	5.518 km (3.429 mi)	2021	2x2	S38 Gansu Wangxia Expressway	left tube: 5,505m, right tube: 5,518m
Yongdong Tunnel (永董隧道)	Yunnan	5.515 km (3.4 mi)	u/c	2x2	Ruili-Menglian Expressway	
Yemaliang Tunnel (野马梁隧道)	Shanxi	5.512 km (3.425 mi)	2017	2x2	Shanxi Linghe Expressway	left tube: 5512m right tube:5512m
Jiulianshan Tunnel (九连山隧道)	Guangdong	5.510 km (3.424 mi)	2018	2x3	G04_{22} Wuhan-Shenzhen Expressway	left tube: 5,450m, right tube: 5,510m
Xiangjunshan Tunnel (象君山隧道)	Henan	5.508 km (3.423 mi)	2023	2x2	Luanchuan-Lushi Expressway	
Dejiang Tunnel (德江隧道)	Guizhou	5.505 km (3.421 mi)	2021	2x2	Dejiang-Xishui Expressway	left tube: 5,505m, right tube: 5,425m
Chuyang Tunnel (楚阳隧道)	Hubei, Chongqing	5.501 km (3.418 mi)	2014	2x2	G42 Shanghai–Chengdu Expressway	left tube: 5,444m, right tube: 5,501m
Nansan Tunnel (南伞隧道)	Yunnan	5.500 km (3.4 mi)	2021	2x2	Zhengkang-Qingshuihe Expressway	left tube: 5,456m, right tube: 5,500m
Daliangshan Tunnel (大梁山隧道)	Yunnan	5.500 km (3.4 mi)	u/c	2x2	Zhengkang-Qingshuihe Expressway	left tube: 5,493m, right tube: 5,500m
Qiangfengling Tunnel (抢风岭隧道)	Shanxi	5.495 km (3.414 mi)	2012	2x2	G18 Rongcheng–Wuhai Expressway	2 tubes
Liulangshan Tunnel (六郎山隧道)	Shanxi	5.493 km (3.413 mi)	2014	2x2	Shuozhou Ring Expressway	left tube: 5,412m, right tube: 5,493m
Shaoping Tunnel (哨坪隧道)	Yunnan	5.486 km (3.4 mi)	2023	2x2	Ninglang-Yongsheng Expressway	left tube: 5,486m, right tube: 5,473m
Ganyanggou Tunnel (赶羊沟隧道)	Sichuan	5.483 km (3.407 mi)	2019	2x2	G42_{17} Chengdu-Changdu Expressway	left tube: 5,390m, right tube: 5,483m
Qinfeng Tunnel (勤丰隧道)	Yunnan	5.48 km (3.41 mi)	2022	2x3	G56_{21} Kunming-Dali Expressway	
Dalijiashan Tunnel (大力加山隧道)	Qinghai	5.476 km (3.403 mi)	2018	2x2	S22 Linxia-Gonghe Expressway	left tube: 5,461m, right tube: 5,476m
Shenchangcun Tunnel (深长村隧道)	Yunnan	5.460 km (3.4 mi)	2024	2x3	G56_{12} Dali-Lincang Expressway	left tube: 5,425m, right tube: 5,460m
Changning Tunnel (昌宁隧道)	Yunnan	5.452 km (3.4 mi)	2023	2x2	G56_{15} Tianbao-Houqiao Expressway	left tube: 5,452m, right tube: 5,425m
Bayuan Tunnel (灞源隧道)	Shaanxi	5.450 km (3.386 mi)	2012	2x2	G40 Shanghai–Xi'an Expressway	left tube: 5,445m, right tube: 5,450m
Baidicheng Tunnel (白帝城隧道)	Chongqing	5.446 km (3.4 mi)	u/c	2x2	G69_{11} Ankang-Laifeng Expressway	
Yuliangzhou Tunnel (鱼梁洲隧道)	Hubei	5.440 km (3.4 mi)	2022	2x3	Xiangyang East-West Axis	
Sanhuashi Tunnel (三花石隧道)	Shaanxi	5.434 km (3.377 mi)	2011	2x2	G7011 Shiyan–Tianshui Expressway	left tube: 5,431m, right tube: 5,434m
Dongshan Tunnel (东山隧道)	Yunnan	5.425 km (3.371 mi)	2021	2x2	Weixing-Tianbo Expressway	
Xiangyangshan Tunnel (向阳山隧道)	Yunnan	5.417 km (3.366 mi)	2024	2x2	Sanbo - Qingshui Expressway	left tube: 5,417m
Pulongshan Tunnel (埔龙山隧道)	Guangxi	5.416 km (3.365 mi)	2025	2x2	Nanning-Dongzhong Expressway	left tube: 5,416m, right tube: 5,406m
Kuiwu Tunnel (奎武隧道)	Sichuan	5.410 km (3.362 mi)	2025	2x2	Luding-Shimian Expressway	left tube: 5,334m, right tube: 5,410m
Yangtoushan Tunnel (仰头山隧道)	Chongqing	5.408 km (3.360 mi)	2014	2x2	Qiangjiang-Enshi Expressway	left tube: 5,408m, right tube: 5,385m
Qiyaoshan Tunnel (七曜山隧道)	Chongqing	5.400 km (3.355 mi)	2020	2x2	G55_{15} Zhangjiajie-Nanchong Expressway	left tube: 5,378m, right tube: 5,400m
Jinjihu Tunnel (金鸡湖隧道)	Jiangsu	5.400 km (3.355 mi)	2022	2x3 + 1 subway tube	Zhongxin Avenue	
Xinchang Tunnel (新场隧道)	Yunnan	5.387 km (3.347 mi)	2022	2x2	Yibin-Zhaotong Expressway	left tube: 5,387m, right tube: 5,384m
Botanggou Tunnel (鹁塘沟隧道)	Hebei	5.386 km (3.347 mi)	2023	2x3	G01_{21} Beijing-Qinghuangdao Expressway	left tube: 5,342m, right tube: 5,386m
Jiulingshan Tunnel(九岭山隧道)	Jiangxi	5.384 km (3.345 mi)	2008	2x2	G45 Daqing–Guangzhou Expressway	
Husa Tunnel (户撒隧道)	Yunnan	5.370 km (3.337 mi)	2020	2x2	Tengchong-Longchuan Expressway	left tube: 5,370m, right tube: 5,339m
Xinminzhai Tunnel (新民寨隧道)	Yunnan	5.370 km (3.337 mi)	2022	2x2	Gejiu-Yuanmou Expressway	
Guling Tunnel (鼓岭隧道)	Fujian	5.367 km (3.335 mi)	2020	2x3	China National Highway G104	left tube: 5,351m, right tube: 5,367m
Shisungou Tunnel (石笋沟隧道)	Guizhou	5.364 km (3.333 mi)	2022	2x3	G42_{15} Chengdu-Zunyi Expressway	left tube: 5,364m, right tube: 5,339m
Qipanguan Tunnel (棋盘关隧道)	Shaanxi	5.360 km (3.331 mi)	2008	2x2	G5 Beijing–Kunming Expressway	
Laoyingpan #1 Tunnel (老营盘一号隧道)	Sichuan	5.355 km (3.327 mi)	u/c	2x2	G76_{11} Duyun-Shangrila Expressway	
Jinjihu Tunnel (金鸡湖隧道)	Jiangsu	5.352 km (3.326 mi)	2022	2x3		
Futang Tunnel (福堂隧道)	Sichuan	5.347 km (3.322 mi)	2012	2x2	G42_{17} Chengdu-Changdu Expressway	left tube: 5,347m, right tube: 5,264m
Anshi Tunnel (安石隧道)	Yunnan	5.338 km (3.317 mi)	2022	2x2	Tengchong-Longchuan Expressway	left tube: 5,263m, right tube: 5,338m
Lishanping Tunnel (黎山坪隧道)	Yunnan	5.338 km (3.317 mi)	2022	2x2	Tengchong-Longchuan Expressway	left tube: 5,338m, right tube: 4,875m
Farui Tunnel (发瑞隧道)	Guangxi	5.334 km (3.314 mi)	2021	2x2	Hezhou-Bama Expressway	left tube: 5,334m, right tube: 5,325m
Daliangzi Tunnel (大梁子隧道)	Sichuan	5.333 km (3.314 mi)	2008	1x2	Lianghekou Hydroelectricity Power Station Road	
Guling Tunnel (鹘岭隧道)	Shaanxi	5.333 km (3.314 mi)	2009	2x2	G70 Fuzhou–Yinchuan Expressway	left tube: 5,273m, right tube: 5,333m
Yingxiu Tunnel (映秀隧道)	Sichuan	5.325 km (3.309 mi)	2012	2x2	G42_{17} Chengdu-Changdu Expressway	left tube: 5,305m, right tube: 5,325m
Qinglan Tunnel (勤兰隧道)	Guangxi	5.322 km (3.307 mi)	2023	2x3	G75_{22} Guiyang-Beihai Expressway	
Haizishan #1 Tunnel (海子山一号隧道)	Sichuan	5.319 km (3.305 mi)	u/c	2x2	G06_{15} Delingha-Kangding Expressway	left tube: 5,316m, right tube: 5,319m, Elevation: 3,600m
Laoyingwo Tunnel (老鹰窝隧道)	Yunnan	5.310 km (3.3 mi)	2017	1x2	Wudongde Hydropower Station Road	
Hejian #2 Tunnel (鹤剑二号隧道)	Yunnan	5.310 km (3.3 mi)	u/c	2x2	Heqing-Jianchuan-Lanping Expressway	left tube: 5,287m, right tube: 5,310m
Zhongliangshan Tunnel (中梁山隧道)	Chongqing	5.310 km (3.3 mi)	2024	2x3	Chongqing-Wuhan Second Line Expressway	left tube: 5,265m, right tube: 5,310m
Taiping Tunnel (太平隧道)	Sichuan	5.309 km (3.299 mi)	2024	2x2	G42_{16} Chengdu-Lijiang Expressway	left tube: 5,309m, right tube: 5,295m
Dahualing Tunnel (大华岭隧道)	Hebei	5.300 km (3.293 mi)	2010	2x2	G95 Capital Region Ring Expressway	left tube: 5,215m, right tube: 5,300m
Taibaishan Tunnel (太白山隧道)	Shaanxi	5.277 km (3.279 mi)	u/c	2x2	Meixian-Taibai Expressway	
Bataishan Tunnel (八台山隧道)	Chongqing-Sichuan	5.275 km (3.278 mi)	2013	1x2	Chengwan Express Highway	
Huangjiagou Tunnel (黄家沟隧道)	Guizhou	5.275 km (3.278 mi)	2023	2x3	G7521 Chongqing-Guiyang Expressway	left tube: 5,265m, right tube: 5,275m
Nanjingli Tunnel (南京里隧道)	Yunnan	5.273 km (3.276 mi)	2017	2x2	Ruili-Longchuan Expressway	left tube: 5,270m right tube:5,273m
Baiyanjiao Tunnel (白岩脚隧道)	Yunnan	5.265 km (3.272 mi)	2021	2x2	Zhaotong-Luzhou Expressway	left tube: 5,265m right tube:5,245m
Zhaxi Tunnel (扎西隧道)	Sichuan	5.259 km (3.268 mi)	2020	2x2	Yinbin-Bijie Expressway	left tube: 5,259m, right tube:5,255m
Maojian Tunnel (毛尖隧道)	Guizhou	5.257 km (3.267 mi)	2021	2x2	G76_{11} Duyun-Shangrila Expressway	left tube: 5,257m, right tube: 5,222m
Tianshengqiao Tunnel (天生桥隧道)	Yunnan	5.257 km (3.267 mi)	2023	2x2	S51 Lincang-Shuangjiang Expressway	left tube: 5,257m, right tube: 5,200m
Yaolongshan Tunnel (尧龙山隧道)	Chongqing - Guizhou	5.254 km (3.265 mi)	2022	2x3	G75_{21} Chongqing-Guiyang Expressway	left tube: 5,254m, right tube: 5,241m
Heimaguan Tunnel (黑马关隧道)	Gansu	5.250 km (3.262 mi)	2025	2x2	Kangxian-Lueyang Expressway	
Nalang Tunnel (那朗隧道)	Yunnan	5.245 km (3.259 mi)	2023	2x2	Lincang-Qingshuihe Expressway	
Yanmengguan Tunnel (雁门关隧道)	Shanxi	5.235 km (3.253 mi)	2003	2x2	G55 Erenhot-Guangzhou Expressway	left tube: 5,160m, right tube: 5,235m
Xiaba Tunnel (下坝隧道)	Guizhou	5.235 km (3.253 mi)	2024	2x2	G76_{21} Nayong-Xingyi Expressway	left tube: 5,208m, right tube: 5,235m
Yuquanxi Tunnel (渔泉溪隧道)	Hubei	5.228 km (3.249 mi)	2009	2x2	G50 Shanghai–Chongqing Expressway	left tube: 5,107m, right tube: 5,228m
Lianhuashan #1 Tunnel (莲花山一号隧道)	Guangdong	5.225 km (3.247 mi)	2016	2x3	G15_{23} Ningbo-Dongguan Expressway	left tube: 5,190m, right tube: 5,225m
Yunzhongshan Tunnel (云中山隧道)	Fujian	5.222 km (3.245 mi)	2012	2x2	S21 Zhenghe-Yongding Expressway	left tube: 5,222m, right tube: 5,210m
Hulusi Tunnel (葫芦丝隧道)	Yunnan	5.215 km (3.240 mi)	2024	2x2	Mangshi-Lianghe Expressway	
Chenghaihu #2 Tunnel (程海湖二号隧道)	Yunnan	5.205 km (3.234 mi)	2024	2x2	G42_{16} Chengdu-Lijiang Expressway	
Tongluoshan Tunnel (铜锣山隧道)	Sichuan	5.197 km (3.229 mi)	2008	2x2	G42 Shanghai–Chengdu Expressway	
Longwan #2 Tunnel (龙湾2号隧道)	Guangxi	5.195 km (3.228 mi)	2023	2x2	S30 Hezhou-Bama Expressway	
Baimaxueshan #1 Tunnel (白马雪山一号隧道)	Yunnan	5.180 km (3.219 mi)	2016	1x2	China National Highway 214	
Hexin Tunnel (和新隧道)	Fujian	5.180 km (3.219 mi)	2015	2x2	G76 Xiamen–Chengdu Expressway	left tube: 5,165m, right tube: 5,180m
Zilinshan Tunnel (紫林山隧道)	Guizhou	5.177 km (3.217 mi)	2019	2x2	Yuqing-Anlong Expressway	left tube: 5,177m, right tube:5,160m
Hengshan Tunnel (恒山隧道)	Shanxi	5.170 km (3.2 mi)	2012	2x2	G18 Rongcheng–Wuhai Expressway	Left tube:5,160m, Right tube:5,170m
Suoguxiuzhai Tunnel (索古修寨隧道)	Sichuan	5.167 km (3.211 mi)	2022	2x2	G85_{13} Pingliang-Mianyang Expressway	Left tube:5,167m, Right tube:5,072m
Muerguashan Tunnel (木耳瓜山隧道)	Sichuan	5.155 km (3.203 mi)	u/c	1x2	China National Highway G549	
Lancang Tunnel (澜沧隧道)	Yunnan	5.144 km (3.196 mi)	2021	2x2	Simao-Lancang Expressway	left tube: 5,144m, right tube: 5,136m
Majiazhai Tunnel (马家寨隧道)	Yunnan	5.143 km (3.196 mi)	2023	2x2	Lincang-Qingshuihe Expressway	left tube: 5,067m, right tube:5,143m
Lianhuashan #2 Tunnel (莲花山二号隧道)	Guangdong	5.140 km (3.194 mi)	2016	2x3	G15_{23} Ningbo-Dongguan Expressway	left tube: 5,140m, right tube: 5,108m
Dalian Bay Undersea Tunnel (大连湾海底隧道)	Liaoning	5.140 km (3.194 mi)	2023	2x4		
Gongtong Tunnel (珙桐隧道)	Guizhou	5.133 km (3.189 mi)	2024	2x2	G76_{21} Nayong-Xingyi Expressway	left tube: 5,133m, right tube: 5,123m
Daxiemachang Tunnel (大歇马场隧道)	Yunnan	5.132 km (3.189 mi)	u/c	2x2	Pu'er-Zhengjing Expressway	
Chaoyang Tunnel (朝阳隧道)	Chongqing	5.132 km (3.189 mi)	2025	2x2	Wushan-Yunxian-Kaizhou Expressway	left tube: 5,132, right tube:5,110m
Lixian Tunnel (礼县隧道)	Gansu	5.114 km (3.178 mi)	u/c	2x2	Jingtai-Lixian Expressway	left tube: 5,114m, right tube: 5,098m
Pingtian Tunnel (平田隧道)	Guangxi	5.110 km (3.175 mi)	2020	2x2	Datang-Pubei Expressway	left tube: 5,110m, right tube: 5,105m
Changshan Tunnel (长山隧道)	Sichuan	5.106 km (3.173 mi)	2013	2x2	S66 Sichuan Hanzi Expressway	left tube: 5,068m, right tube: 5,106m
Zhugeling Tunnel (诸葛岭隧道)	Zhejiang	5.103 km (3.171 mi)	u/c	2x2	Qingtian-Wencheng Expressway	
Taoziya Tunnel (桃子垭隧道)	Guizhou	5.100 km (3.169 mi)	2021	2x2	Zheng'an-Xishui Expressway	left tube: 5,257m, right tube: 5,222m
Weinan Tunnel (渭南隧道)	Gansu	5.094 km (3.165 mi)	2021	2x2	G85_{13} Pingliang-Mianyang Expressway	
Pingqiao Tunnel (平桥隧道)	Chongqing	5.093 km (3.165 mi)	2021	2x2	G55_{15} Zhangjiajie-Nanchong Expressway	
Baitacun Tunnel (白塔村隧道)	Yunnan	5.090 km (3.163 mi)	2024	2x2	G56_{12} Dali-Lincang Expressway	
Baoding #1 Tunnel (宝鼎一号隧道)	Sichuan	5.087 km (3.161 mi)	2020	2x2	Panzhihua-Dali Expressway	left tube: 5,084m, right tube: 5,087m
Fengjieliang Tunnel (分界梁隧道)	Chongqing	5.085 km (3.160 mi)	2010	2x2	G42 Shanghai–Chengdu Expressway	left tube: 5,085m, right tube: 5,080m
Zhuge Tunnel (朱噶隧道)	Guizhou	5.083 km (3.158 mi)	2019	2x2	G76_{11} Duyun-Shangrila Expressway	left tube: 5,055m, right tube: 5,083m
Caihongling Tunnel (彩虹岭隧道)	Guangdong	5.068 km (3.149 mi)	2007	1x2	Shuanghe Highway	
Cili Tunnel (慈利隧道)	Hunan	5.060 km (3.144 mi)	2025	2x2	G59 Hohhot–Beihai Expressway	left tube: 5,060m, right tube: 5,042m
Hualongshan Tunnel (化龙山隧道)	Shaanxi	5.053 km (3.140 mi)	2020	2x2	G69_{11} Ankang-Laifeng Expressway	left tube: 5,053m, right tube: 5,053m
Laoyingpan #2 Tunnel (老营盘二号隧道)	Sichuan	5.030 km (3.125 mi)	u/c	2	G76_{11} Duyun-Shangrila Expressway	
Taishi Tunnel (太石隧道)	Gansu	5.028 km (3.124 mi)	2014	2x2	G8513 Pingliang-Mianyang Expressway	left tube: 5,028m, right tube: 4,984m
Pingdingshan Tunnel (平顶山隧道)	Hebei	5.024 km (3.122 mi)	2015	2x2	G95 Capital Region Ring Expressway	left tube: 5,000m, right tube: 5,024m
Tongluoshan Tunnel (铜锣山隧道)	Sichuan	5.024 km (3.122 mi)	2017	2x2	G55_{15} Zhangjiajie-Nanchong Expressway	
Huayingshan Tunnel (华蓥山隧道)	Chongqing	5.018 km (3.118 mi)	2017	2x3	G85 Yinchuan–Kunming Expressway	left tube: 5,018m, right tube: 5,000m
Taoguan #2 Tunnel (桃关二号隧道)	Sichuan	5.015 km (3.116 mi)	2012	2x2	S7 Sichuan Wenchuan–Maerkang Expressway	left tube: 5,014m, right tube: 5,015m
Yinjiping Tunnel (营基坪隧道)	Sichuan	5.015 km (3.116 mi)	2022	2x2	Emei-Hanyuan Expressway	
Tainiuhu Tunnel (太牛湖隧道)	Zhejiang	5.015 km (3.116 mi)	u/c	2x2	Cangnan-Taishun Expressway	left tube: 4,942m, right tube: 5,015m
Xinlinpu Tunnel (杏林堡隧道)	Hebei	5.012 km (3.114 mi)	2019	2x2	S38_{01} Beijing-Chongli Expressway	left tube: 5,012m, right tube:4,998m
Shantou Bay Tunnel (汕头海湾隧道)	Guangdong	5.010 km (3.113 mi)	2022	2x3	China National Highway G324	
Dafengkou Tunnel (大风口隧道)	Chongqing	5.003 km (3.109 mi)	2013	2x2	G42 Shanghai–Chengdu Expressway	2 tubes
Dabanshan Tunnel (达坂山隧道)	Qinghai	5.000 km (3.107 mi)	2019	2x2	China National Highway G569	left tube: 4,965m, right tube:5,000m
Bijiashan Tunnel (笔架山隧道)	Chongqing	5.000 km (3.107 mi)	2023	2x2	G69_{11} Ankang-Laifeng Expressway	left tube: 4,997m, right tube:5,000m
