= G8517 Pingshan–Xingyi Expressway =

Road in China

Pingshan–Xingyi Expressway
- 坪山－兴义高速公路
- Pingxing Expressway 屏兴高速公路

Route information
- Auxiliary route of G85

Major junctions
- North end: G4216 in Pingshan County, Yibin, Sichuan
- South end: G78 in Xingyi, Qianxinan Buyei and Miao Autonomous Prefecture, Guizhou

Location
- Country: China

Highway system
- National Trunk Highway System; Primary; Auxiliary; National Highways; Transport in China
← G8516	→ G91

The G8517 Pingshan–Xingyi Expressway (Chinese: 屏山—兴义高速公路), also referred to as the Pingxing Expressway (Chinese: 屏兴高速公路), is an expressway in China that connects Pingshan, Sichuan to Xingyi, Guizhou.

== Route ==
The expressway starts in Pingshan, then travels through Yibin, Junlian, Zhenxiong, Hezhang and Liupanshui, before terminating in Xingyi. The route passes through the provinces of Guizhou, Sichuan and Yunnan.
