= G8515 Guang'an–Luzhou Expressway =

Road in China

Guang'an–Luzhou Expressway
- 广安－泸州高速公路
- Guanglu Expressway 广泸高速公路

Route information
- Auxiliary route of G85

Major junctions
- North end: G42 / S304 in Guang'an District, Guang'an, Sichuan
- South end: G4215 / G321 in Longmatan District, Luzhou, Sichuan

Location
- Country: China

Highway system
- National Trunk Highway System; Primary; Auxiliary; National Highways; Transport in China
← G8513	→ G8516

The G8515 Guang'an–Luzhou Expressway (Chinese: 广安—泸州高速公路), also referred to as the Guanglu Expressway (Chinese: 广泸高速公路), is an expressway in China that connects Guang'an to Luzhou.

== Route ==
=== Sichuan (north section) ===
The route of the Guang'an to Wusheng section overlaps with the Guanghong Expressway.

The section from Wusheng to Tongnan is currently under planning.

=== Chongqing ===
The Tongnan to Rongchang section is also known as the Tongrong Expressway. It is 138 km (86 mi) long with a design speed of 100 km/h (62 mph). This section starts at the Sichuan-Chongqing border in the north of Tongnan District, passes through Dazu District, and ends in Rongchang District. Construction began in 2016 and it was opened to traffic on 29 December 2019.

=== Sichuan (south section) ===
The section from Rongchang to Luzhou is also called the Ronglu Expressway. This section is 42.37 km (26.33 mi) long with a designed speed of 100 km/h (62 mph) and it was opened to traffic on 31 December 2019.
