= G8513 Pingliang–Mianyang Expressway =

Expressway in China

Pingliang–Mianyang Expressway
- 平凉－绵阳高速公路
- Pingmian Expressway 平绵高速

Route information
- Auxiliary route of G85

Major junctions
- North end: G22 / G70 in Sishilipu Town, Pingliang
- G85 in Huating; S25 in Huating; S25 in Zhuanglang; G30 in Tianshui; G7011 in Cheng County; G75 in Longnan; Guangyang–Pingwu Expressway in Pingwu
- South end: G5 / G93 in Donglin Township Mianyang

Location
- Country: China

Highway system
- National Trunk Highway System; Primary; Auxiliary; National Highways; Transport in China
← G8512	→ G8515

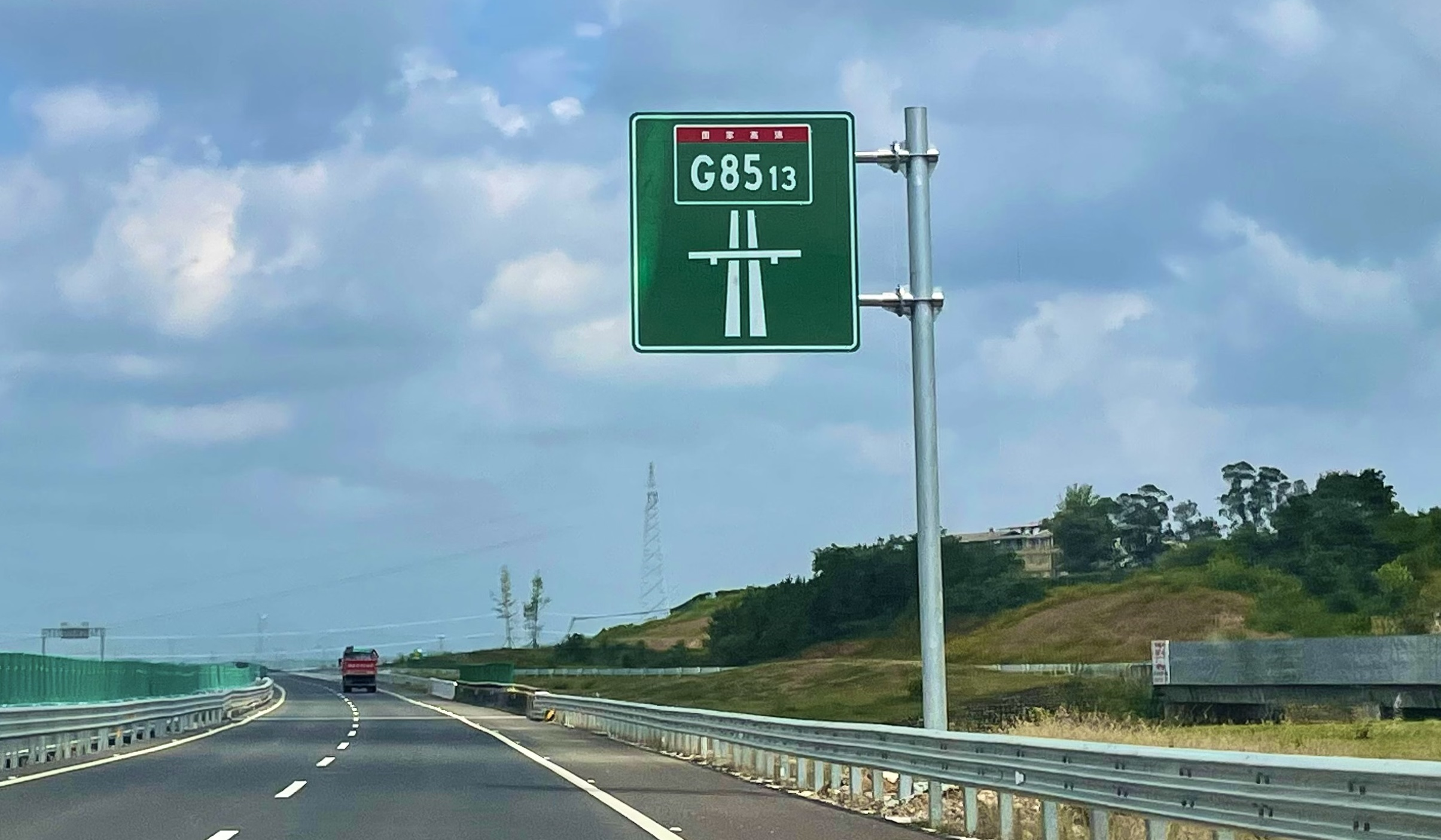
Start of the Pingmian Expressway in Mianyang

The G8513 Pingliang–Mianyang Expressway (Chinese: 平凉－绵阳高速公路), commonly referred to as the Pingmian Expressway (Chinese: 平绵高速), is an expressway in China that connects the cities of Pingliang, Gansu and Mianyang, Sichuan.

The Pingliang–Tianshui section includes the 9,650 m (6.00 mi) Guangshan tunnel through the Liupan Mountains.

== Current status ==
Section	Status
Pingliang–Tianshui	Open
Tianshui–Longnan	Open
Longnan–Jiuzhaigou	Under construction
Jiuzhaigou–Jiangyou	Under construction
Jiangyou–Mianyang	Open
