= G8516 Bazhong–Chengdu Expressway =

Road in China

Bazhong–Chengdu Expressway
- 巴中－成都高速公路
- Barong Expressway 巴蓉高速公路

Route information
- Auxiliary route of G85
- Length: 304.4 km (189.1 mi)

Major junctions
- West end: G42 in Qingbaijiang District, Chengdu, Sichuan
- East end: G85 in Bazhou District, Bazhong, Sichuan

Location
- Country: China

Highway system
- National Trunk Highway System; Primary; Auxiliary; National Highways; Transport in China
← G8515	→ G8517

The G8516 Bazhong–Chengdu Expressway (Chinese: 巴中—成都高速公路), also referred to as the S2 Barong Expressway (Chinese: 巴蓉高速公路), is an expressway in Sichuan, China that connects Bazhong to Chengdu. It was officially opened to traffic on 20 January 2013, and upgraded to a national expressway in July 2022.

== Route ==
=== Chengdu to Nanchong ===
The section from Chengdu to Nanchong has a total length of 191 km (119 mi) and is commonly known as the Chengdenan Expressway. It passes through Qingbaijiang, Jintang, Zhongjiang, Santai, Shehong, Yanting and Xichong. The section from Qingbaijiang to Santai and a section in Xichong were opened to traffic on 30 December 2012, while the remaining sections were opened to traffic on 20 January 2013.

=== Nanchong to Bazhong ===
The Nanchong to Bazhong section is commonly known as the Banan Expressway. It is 113.36 km (70.44 mi) long and was opened to traffic on 1 January 2013.
