= G7521 Chongqing–Guiyang Expressway =

Road in China

Chongqing–Guiyang Expressway
- 重庆－贵阳高速公路
- Yuzhu Expressway 渝筑高速公路

Route information
- Auxiliary route of G75

Major junctions
- North end: G5001 in Banan District, Chongqing
- South end: G69 in Wudang District, Guiyang, Guizhou

Location
- Country: China

Highway system
- National Trunk Highway System; Primary; Auxiliary; National Highways; Transport in China
← G7512	→ G7522

The G7521 Chongqing–Guiyang Expressway (Chinese: 重庆至贵阳高速公路), also referred to as the Yuzhu Expressway (Chinese: 渝筑高速公路), is an expressway in China that connects the direct-administered municipality of Chongqing to the cities of Zunyi and Guiyang in the province of Guizhou.
