= G4217 Chengdu–Chamdo Expressway =

Road in China

Chengdu–Chamdo Expressway
- 成都－昌都高速公路
- Rongchang Expressway 蓉昌高速公路

Route information
- Auxiliary route of G42

Major junctions
- West end: Chamdo, Tibet
- East end: G93 in Pidu District, Chengdu, Sichuan

Location
- Country: China

Highway system
- National Trunk Highway System; Primary; Auxiliary; National Highways; Transport in China
← G4216	→ G4218

The G4217 Chengdu–Chamdo Expressway (Chinese: 成都—昌都高速公路), also referred to as the Rongchang Expressway (Chinese: 蓉昌高速公路), is an under construction expressway in China that connects the cities of Chengdu, Sichuan to Chamdo, Tibet.

== Route ==
The expressway starts in Chengdu, and continues through Dujiangyan, Wenchuan County, Li County, Barkam, Garzê County, Dêgê County and Jomda County, before terminating in Chamdo. The section from Barkam to Chamdo is still under construction.
