= G5912 Fang County–Wufeng Expressway =

Road in China

Fang County–Wufeng Expressway
- 房县－五峰高速公路
- Fangwu Expressway 房五高速公路

Route information
- Auxiliary route of G59
- Length: 212.55 km (132.07 mi)

Major junctions
- North end: G59 / G4213 in Fang County, Shiyan, Hubei
- South end: G59 / Hubei S64 in Wufeng Tujia Autonomous County, Yichang, Hubei

Location
- Country: China

Highway system
- National Trunk Highway System; Primary; Auxiliary; National Highways; Transport in China
← G5911	→ G60

The G5912 Fang County–Wufeng Expressway (Chinese: 房县—五峰高速公路), also referred to as the Fangwu Expressway (Chinese: 房五高速公路), is an expressway in Hubei, China that connects Fang County to Wufeng Tujia Autonomous County.

== Route ==
After completion, it will form a longitudinal passage running through Fangxian, Shennongjia, Xingshan, Changyang, Zigui and Wufeng.
