= G7522 Guiyang–Beihai Expressway =

Road in China

Guiyang–Beihai Expressway
- 贵阳－北海高速公路
- Zhubei Expressway 筑北高速公路

Route information
- Auxiliary route of G75

Major junctions
- North end: Wudang District, Guiyang, Guizhou
- South end: Haicheng District, Beihai, Guangxi

Location
- Country: China

Highway system
- National Trunk Highway System; Primary; Auxiliary; National Highways; Transport in China
← G7521	→ G76

The G7522 Guiyang–Beihai Expressway (Chinese: 贵阳—北海高速公路), also referred to as the Zhubei Expressway (Chinese: 筑北高速公路), is an under construction expressway in China that connects Guiyang, Guizhou to Beihai, Guangxi.

== Route ==
The expressway starts in Wudang District, Guiyang, and passes through Qiannan Buyei and Miao Autonomous Prefecture, Hechi, Nanning and Qinzhou before terminating in Haicheng District, Beihai.
