= G4218 Ya'an–Kargilik Expressway =

Expressway in China

Ya'an–Kargilik Expressway
- 雅安－叶城高速公路
- Yaye Expressway 雅叶高速

Route information
- Auxiliary route of G42
- Length: 1,975.508 km (1,227.524 mi)

Major junctions
- East end: G93 in Yucheng District, Ya'an
- G5 in Yucheng District, Ya'an; G318 in Caiyuanzi, Kangding; G318 in Bayi District, Nyingchi; G318 in Chengguan District, Lhasa; Shiji Avenue in Chengguan District, Lhasa; Tibet S1 (Gonggar Airport Express) Xierong Interchange, in Qüxü County, Lhasa; Shigatse Airport Express in Samzhubzê District, Shigatse; G318 in Samzhubzê District, Shigatse
- West end: G3012 in Yecheng, Hotan

Ya'an-Kangding
- Length: 130.130 km (80.859 mi)
- East end: G93 in Yucheng District, Ya'an
- West end: G318 in Kangding

Kangding Bypass
- Length: 17.893 km (11.118 mi)
- East end: Dongshenghang, Kangding
- West end: Yulin New Town, Kangding

Kangding-Xinduqiao
- Length: 79.2 km (49.2 mi)
- East end: Yulin New Town, Kangding
- West end: G318 in Dong'eluosan village, Xinduqiao Township

Xinduqiao-Nyingchi
- Length: 1,260 km (780 mi)
- East end: Xinduqiao Township
- West end: Nyingchi

Nyingchi-Lhasa High-Standard Highway
- Length: 409.2 km (254.3 mi)
- East end: G318 in Bayi District, Nyingchi
- West end: G318 in Chengguan District, Lhasa

G0602 Lhasa Ring Expressway

Lhasa-Xigazê Peace Airport
- Length: 29 km (18 mi)
- East end: Shiji Avenue, Lhasa
- West end: Tibet S1 (Gonggar Airport Express) Xierong Interchange, Qüxü County, Lhasa

Xigazê Airport Expressway
- Length: 166.976 km (103.754 mi)
- East end: Tibet S1 (Gonggar Airport Express) Xierong Interchange, Qüxü County, Lhasa
- West end: G318 Xigazê Peace Airport

Xigazê-Xinjiang border
- Length: 40.404 km (25.106 mi)
- East end: G318 Xigazê Peace Airport
- West end: G318 Samzhubzê District, Xigazê

Xinjiang section
- Length: 705 km (438 mi)
- East end: Jieshan Daban
- West end: G3012 in Yecheng, Hotan

Location
- Country: China

Highway system
- National Trunk Highway System; Primary; Auxiliary; National Highways; Transport in China
← G4217	→ G4219

The G4218 Ya'an-Yecheng Expressway (Chinese: 雅安－叶城高速公路), commonly referred to as the Yaye Expressway (Chinese: 雅叶高速), is an expressway that will traverse the entirety of Tibet and link Ya'an in Sichuan to Yecheng in Xinjiang.

== Description ==
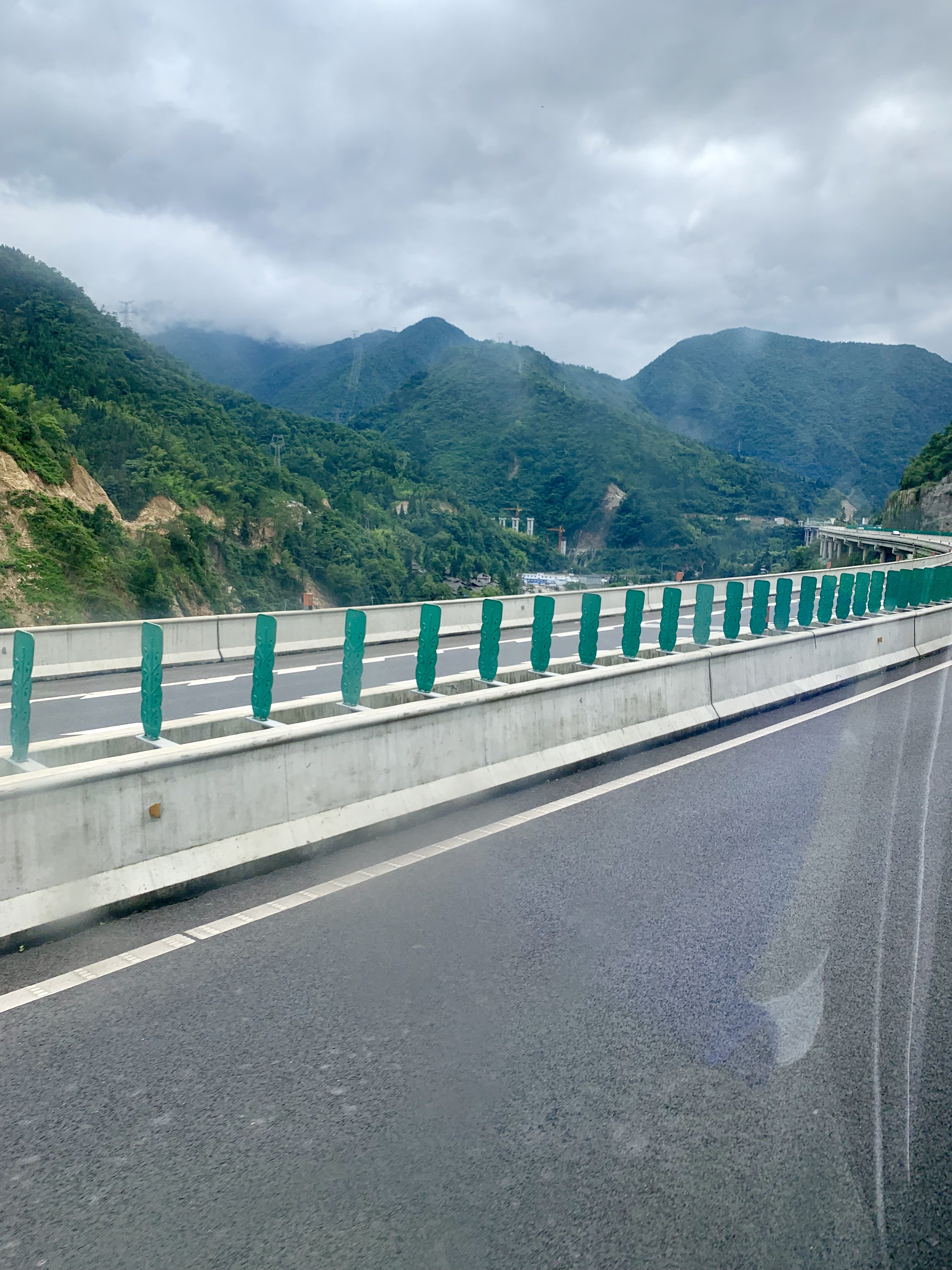
The Yaye Expressway in Sichuan

In a unique case for a spur route, when fully completed, its length will be over 4,000 km (1975.508 km between Ya'an and Qüxü alone), much longer than the G42 Shanghai–Chengdu Expressway itself, making it the only spur route in the world to be longer than twice its principal route, the longest spur route in the world, and the second-longest route in the entire NTHS system. The longest national spur route outside China is NH 1A (India) at 663 km, while the G0612 Xining–Hotan Expressway will become the second-longest spur route at roughly 2,400 km.

It is also unusually notable for a spur route, as it traverses all of Tibet, and is solely responsible for connecting the prefectures of Garzê, Nyingchi, Shannan (via G4219), Xigazê and Ngari to the NTHS system. It is practically an extension of G42, but shares its last two digits with the culturally prestigious China National Highway 318, which parallels it for the Ya'an-Lhatse section, and which in turn is part of AH 42.

Moreover, it does not even connect to G42: the Chengdu-Ya'an section of G5/G93 links them, and together they will create an uninterrupted, non-detouring domestic drive between Shanghai and Kargilik that is over 6,000 km long.

Right now, it has yet to be completed, and only the Ya'an-Kangding section is currently linked to the system, which is currently only 135 km in length. The Qüxü-Lhasa and Lhasa-Nyingchi sections are completed but isolated from the rest of the network.

== Background ==
The Chinese People's Political Consultative Conference conducted research in 2015 showing that despite 60 years of efforts that changed the primitive transportation methods in the Qinghai-Tibetan Plateau, infrastructure is still lacking:

We have good mountains, good forests, good people, but bad roads... ...The highway/railway/airport density in the Tibetan Autonomous region is still far below the national average, the Tibetan areas of Sichuan have no railways, the Garzê Tibetan Autonomous Prefecture is the only prefecture without First-class highways and completed expressways in Sichuan Province...

— Officials and commoners along the Sichuan-Tibet corridors, as recorded by CPPCC in 2015,

It is considered impractical to construct all sections of the Sichuan-Tibet expressways and railway all at once.

== Construction ==
The following words were used to solely describe the Ya'an-Kangding section, but any section east of Nyingchi and west of Xigazê won't be much easier:

Constructing this section is nothing but climbing the Mount Everest of expressway construction. If we can solve the various technical problems regarding this, we would be more than capable to easily handle any other expressway project anywhere else.

— Involved experts after a comprehensive survey,

The Ya'an-Kangding section alone climbs 2,000 m of altitude over its 130 km route. The Ya'an-Xichang expressway earned the nickname of "the ladder to heaven" for its steepness, but it still pales in comparison to this section. It's considered at least "extreme on five aspects", namely geography, geology (the region not only being prone to earthquakes, but also difficult to tunnel through), climate, ecology, and engineering challenge. Some people in charge of construction reportedly reacted with disbelief upon first seeing the detailed plan.

The Kangding Bypass section encountered hundreds of rock bursts that affected the safety of the project. Paomashan Tunnel 1 couldn't be constructed as a straight line for not even tunneling straight through mountains could bring steepness down to NTHS expressway standards, having a 220m difference in altitude between its entrance and exit.

Details of people documenting the difficulties encountered in the construction of G4218 is widely available in Chinese but not in other languages. The Lhasa-Nyingchi section has a projected cost of CN¥92 million/km, and for the Kangding-Xinduqiao section the figure is CN¥192 million/km, which is equivalent to US$72 million/mile (PPP, rather than nominal exchange rates), compared to the usual maximum US$9 million/mile for rural expressways.

Constructing costs of G42 and its auxiliaries (figures with ~ are estimates) (all costs are in CN¥100 million)
NTHS number	Section	Length (km)	Projected Cost	Cost per km	Notes
G42	Shanghai-Chengdu	1,960	~3,000	~1.53	CN¥1,700 million excluding upgrades and adjusted for inflation.
G4201	Wuhan Loop	188	~100	~0.53	
G4202	Chengdu Loop	85	~50	~0.59	
G4211	Nanjing-Wuhu	74	~100	~1.35	CN¥71 million used for upgrades from 4 to 8 lanes.
G4212	Hefei-Anqing	171	~150	~0.88	Including sections later designated G3 and G50.
G4213	Macheng-Hong'an	25	25	1.0	
G4213	Hong'an-Dawu	57	25	0.439	
G4213	Dawu-Baokang	546	~600	~1.10	
G4213	Full length G4213	~628	~650	~1.04	
G4215	Chengdu-Chishui	308	198	0.643	
G4215	Chishui-Renhuai	157	143	0.911	
G4215	Renhuai-Zunyi	36	24	0.667	
G4215	Full length G4215	501	365	0.729	
G4216	Chengdu-Renshou	71	n/a	n/a	Cost already accounted for, as it's part of the Chengdu-Chishui section of G4215.
G4216	Renshou-Manjing	6.6	~5	~0.76	Part of Sichuan Expressway S40
G4216	Manjing-Xinshizhen, Yibin	~165	222	~1.35	
G4216	Xinshizhen, Yibin-Panzhihua	429	826	1.925	452km including branch access roads Considered the most expensive single-section contract in road construction in China
G4216	Panzhihua-Shilongba	~51	55	~1.08	
G4216	Shilongba-Lijiang	~142	303	~2.13	
G4216	Full length G4216	~865	1,411	~1.63	
G4217	Chengdu-Dujiangyan	36	~20	0.556	
G4217	Dujiangyan-Wenchuan	72	~80	1.111	CN¥32 million discounting upgrades, before adjusted for inflation
G4217	Wenchuan-Barkam	172	287	1.669	
G4217	Barkam-Qamdo	~720	~1,600	~2.2	
G4217	Full length G4217	~1,000	~1,987	~1.99	
G4218	Ya'an-Kangding	130.130	230	1.767	135km including Kangding city access
G4218	Kangding Bypass	17.893	32	1.788	
G4218	Kangding-Xinduqiao	79.2	152	1.919	
G4218	Xinduqiao-Nyingchi	~1,260	~2,500	~1.98	
G4218	Nyingchi-Lhasa	409	380	0.929	
G4218	Lhasa Gonggar Airport Express	29.6	15.9	0.537	37.8km if Including Xierong Interchange-Gonggar Airport
G4218	Xierong Interchange-Shigatse Peace Airport	166.976	286	1.713	
G4218	Shigatse Airport Express	40.404	19.21	0.475	
G4218	Shigatse-Shiquanhe	~1,500	~2,000	~2.0	
G4218	Shiquanhe-Jieshandaban	~1,500	~1,000	~2.0	
G4218	Jieshandaban-Yecheng	~705	~2,000	~2.8	
G4218	Full length G4218	~4,300	~8,500	~2.0	
G4221	Wuhan-Yingshan	124	54	0.435	
G4221	Yingshan-Yuexi	68.5	48	0.701	
G4221	Yuexi-Fangangzhen	64	~400	~0.73	
G4221	Fangangzhen-Lujiang	43	~400	~0.73	Cost already accounted for, as it's part of G4212.
G4221	Lujiang-Shijianzhen	73	~400	~0.73	
G4221	Shijianzhen-Shanghai	367	~400	~0.73	
G4221	Full length G4221	696.5	~502	~0.68	
Total	G42(XX)	~10,400	~17,000	~1.63	
Entire US Interstate Highway System		77,960	~30,000	~0.38	Nominal exchange rates
Entire US Interstate Highway System		77,960	~19,000	~0.24	Purchasing Power Parity
exceptionally difficult sections are in red

== Ya'an-Kangding Section ==
135 km long, finished. This section costs CN¥23 billion for 135 km. However, only 130.130 km is on the main line, the rest is linking it to Kangding city center.

== Kangding Bypass ==
Under construction. Has a projected cost of CN¥3.2 billion.

== Kangding-Xinduqiao Section ==
Planning finished. This section has a projected cost of CN¥15.2 billion for 79 km (actual costs may be higher).

== Xinduqiao-Nyingchi Section ==
Planned.

== Nyingchi-Lhasa High-Standard Highway ==
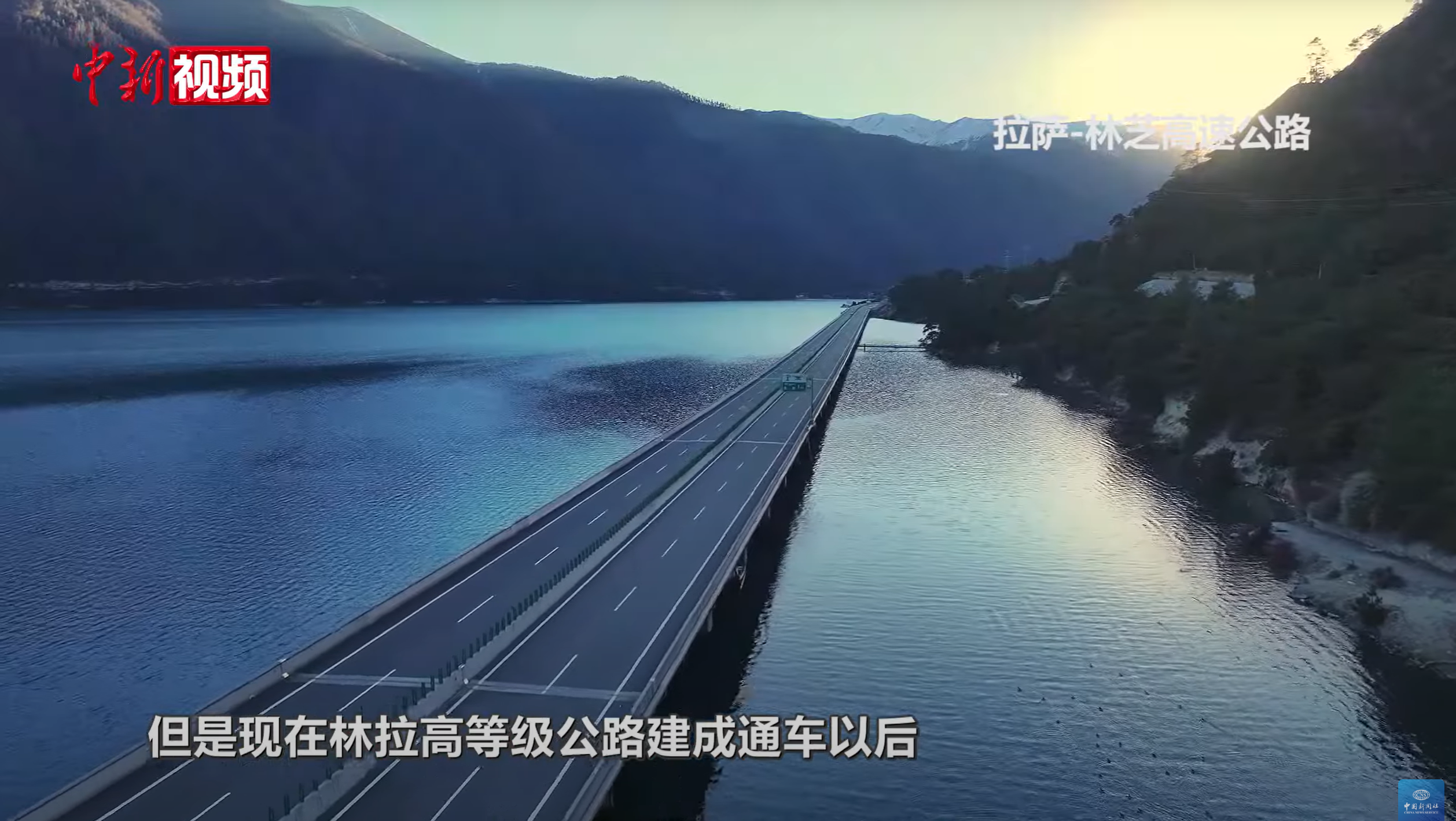
Lhasa-Nyingchi Expressway in 2025

Finished. It has the full characteristics of an expressway, but isn't tolled. This section had a projected cost of CN¥38 billion for 409 km (actual costs may be higher).

== G0602 Lhasa Ring Expressway ==
Long-term plan.

== Lhasa Gonggar Airport Expressway ==
Completed in 2011. The Lhasa City Center-Xierong Interchange section constitutes part of G4218.

== Xierong Interchange-Xigazê Peace Airport ==
Under construction. 166.976 km long. The section east of Qüxü has been completed and it will give a total projected length of 1975.508 km between Ya'an and Qüxü

== Xigazê Airport Expressway ==
Links the airport with the city center. 40.404 km long.

== Xigazê-Shiquanhe, Gar County, Ngari Prefecture ==
Although the Ngari Prefecture is the pole of inaccessibility of China, as of the 2035 plan, all prefectural capitals will be connected to the NTHS without exceptions, meaning that this section is intended to be finished by no later than then.

== Shiquanhe, Gar County-Jieshan Pass ==
Long-term plan.

== Jieshan Pass-Yecheng ==
705 km long. Included in Xinjiang's plan but won't be finished before 2025. The corresponding national highway section is the most dangerous and unmaintainable national standard route in the nation.
