= China National Highway 341 =

Road in China

National Highway 341
- 341国道

Major junctions
- From: Jiaonan
- G206 Zhucheng, Shandong G233 Yishui, Shandong; G220 G105 Pingyin, Shandong; G106 Nanle, Henan; G107 Anyang, Henan; G108 Huozhou, Shanxi; G209 Xixian, Shanxi; G210 Yanchuan, Shaanxi; G211 Huanxian, Gansu; G344 Heicheng, Ningxia; G109 Baiyin, Gansu; G312 Yongdeng, Gansu G227 Datong, Qinghai
- To: G315 Haiyan

Location
- Country: China

Highway system
- National Trunk Highway System; Primary; Auxiliary
← G340	→ G342

China National Highway 341 will run from Jiaonan in Shandong to Haiyan in Qinghai. It is one of the new trunk highways proposed in the China National Highway Network Planning (2013 - 2030).

== Status ==
Shandong

Complete between Jiaonan and Zhucheng. The section is mainly upgraded former provincial highways S324 and S710.

Henan

Completed around Nanle and Anyang.

Shanxi

The Shanxi section is under planning.

Shaanxi

Completed around Yan'an.

Gansu (eastern section)

There are no plans yet to start construction in Huachi County (Shaanxi border-Huan County). Construction is in progress between Huan County urban area and the border with Ningxia. This section will be a 2x2 lane limited-access road.

Ningxia

Construction has started. The route enters Ningxia at Zhaike township, through Sanhe (Heicheng) town, where it crosses G344. The total length in Ningxia is 55 km (34 mi).

Gansu (western section)

Construction of the 61 km section between Baiyin and Lanzhou New Area started in 2017 and was completed in 2021.

Qinghai

Construction has started from Jiading at the border with Gansu to the terminus in Haiyan. Completed within Huzhu County.

== Route table ==
Province	Place	Distance
Shandong	Jiaonan	
Shandong	Zhucheng	
Shandong	Yiyuan	
Shandong	Laiwu	
Shandong	Tai'an	
Shandong	Feicheng	
Shandong	Pingyin	
Shandong	Dong'a	
Shandong	Yanggu	
Shandong	Xinxian	
Henan	Nanle	
Henan	Neihuang	
Henan	Anyang	
Henan	Linzhou	
Shanxi	Pingshun	
Shanxi	Lucheng	
Shanxi	Tunliu	
Shanxi	Qinyuan	
Shanxi	Guxian	
Shanxi	Huozhou	
Shanxi	Fenxi	
Shanxi	Xixian	
Shanxi	Yonghe	
Shaanxi	Yanchuan	
Shaanxi	Yan'an	
Shaanxi	Ansai	
Shaanxi	Zhidan	
Shaanxi	Wuqi	
Gansu	Huachi	
Gansu	Huanxian	
Ningxia	Haiyuan	
Gansu	Pingchuan District, Baiyin	
Gansu	Baiyin	1587
Gansu	Lanzhou New Area	
Qinghai	Huzhu	
Qinghai	Datong	
Qinghai	Haiyan	
