= G76 Xiamen–Chengdu Expressway =

Road in China

Xiamen–Chengdu Expressway
- 厦门－成都高速公路
- Xiarong Expressway 厦蓉高速公路

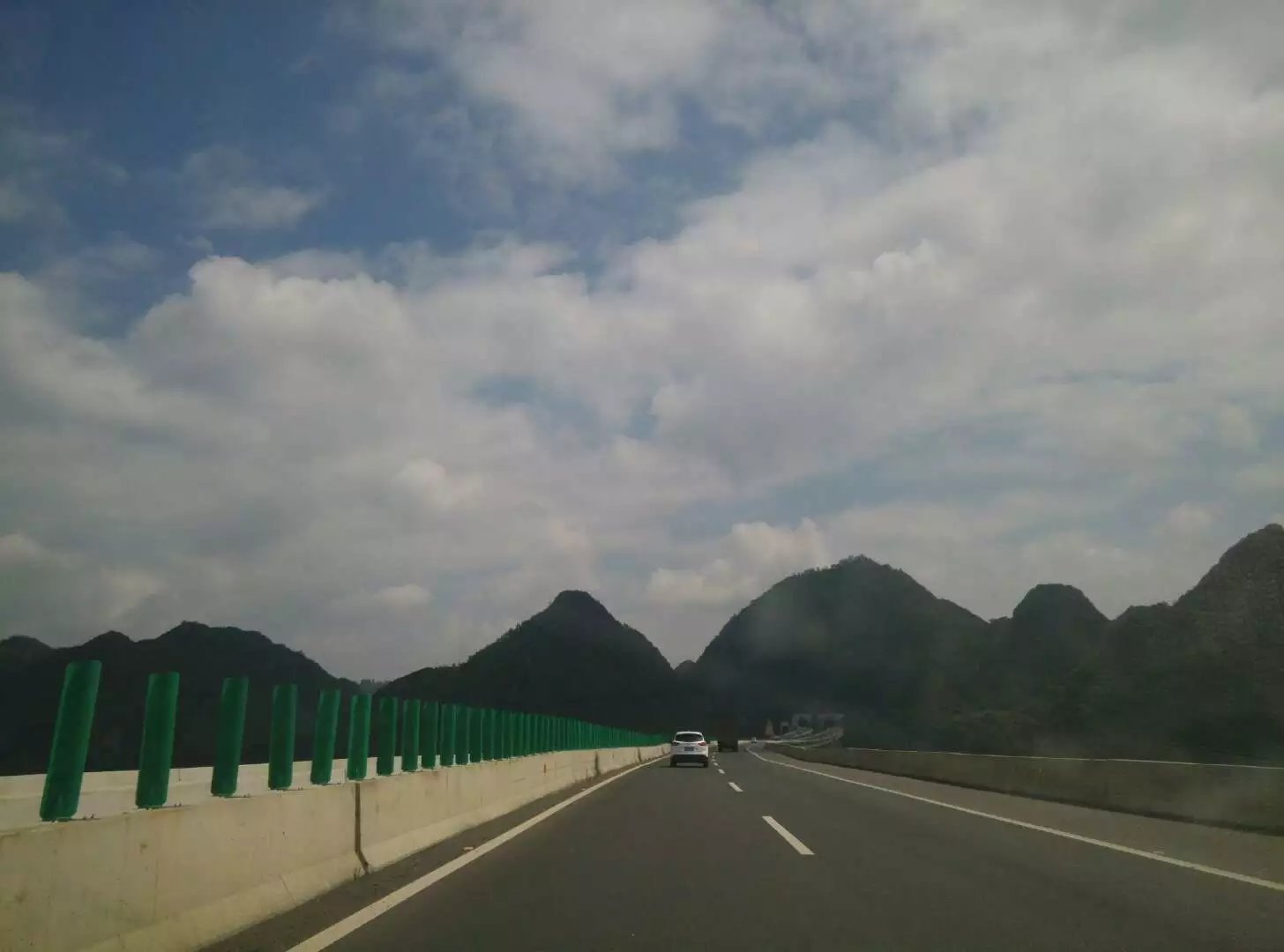
- G76 in Zhijin County, Guizhou

Route information
- Length: 2,192.2 km (1,362.2 mi) Length when complete.

Major junctions
- East end: Xiamen, Fujian (when complete); G15 Shenyang–Haikou Expressway, Longhai, Zhangzhou, Fujian (current)
- West end: East 3rd Ring Road and Yinghui Road, Chengdu, Sichuan

Location
- Country: China

Highway system
- National Trunk Highway System; Primary; Auxiliary; National Highways; Transport in China
← G7522	→ G7611

The Xiamen–Chengdu Expressway (Chinese: 厦门—成都高速公路), designated as G76 and commonly referred to as the Xiarong Expressway (Chinese: 厦蓉高速公路) is an expressway in China that connects the cities of Xiamen, Fujian, and Chengdu, Sichuan. When complete, it will be 2,192.2 km (1,362.2 mi) in length.

== Route ==
=== Guizhou ===
The portion of the expressway connecting the cities of Guiyang and Bijie is referred to as the Guibi Expressway. The portion of the expressway connecting the city of Liupanshui to the Huangguoshu Waterfall is called the Liuhuang Expressway.

== History ==
On 24 June 2025 a landslide caused the partial collapse of a bridge which forms part of the Xiamen-Chengdu Expressway in Sandu county, Guizhou province.
