= G7611 Duyun–Shangri-La Expressway =

Road in China

Duyun–Shangri-La Expressway
- 都匀－香格里拉高速公路
- Duxiang Expressway 都香高速公路

Route information
- Auxiliary route of G76

Major junctions
- West end: Shangri-La, Yunnan
- East end: Duyun, Qiannan Buyei and Miao, Guizhou

Location
- Country: China

Highway system
- National Trunk Highway System; Primary; Auxiliary; National Highways; Transport in China
| ← G76 | → G7612 |

The G7611 Duyun–Shangri-La Expressway (Chinese: 都匀—香格里拉高速公路), also referred to as the Duxiang Expressway (Chinese: 都香高速公路), is an under construction expressway in China that connects Duyun, Guizhou to Shangri-La, Yunnan.

== Route ==
The expressway begins in Duyun, Qiannan Buyei and Miao, before it continues through Huishui, Anshun, Zhenning, Liuzhi, Liupanshui, Weining, Zhaotong, Jinyang and Xichang, before terminating in Shangri-La City.

The route passes through the provinces of Guizhou, Sichuan and Yunnan.
