= G4213 Macheng–Ankang Expressway =

Road in China

Macheng–Ankang Expressway
- 麻城－安康高速公路
- Ma'an Expressway 麻安高速公路

Route information
- Auxiliary route of G42
- Length: 665 km (413 mi)

Major junctions
- West end: G7011 in Hanbin District, Ankang, Shaanxi
- East end: G45 in Macheng, Huanggang, Hubei

Location
- Country: China

Highway system
- National Trunk Highway System; Primary; Auxiliary; National Highways; Transport in China
← G4212	→ G4215

The G4213 Macheng–Ankang Expressway (Chinese: 麻城—安康高速公路), also referred to as the Ma'an Expressway (Chinese: 麻安高速公路), is an expressway in China that connects the cities of Macheng, Hubei to Ankang, Shaanxi.

== Route ==
The expressway starts in Macheng and passes through Dawu County, Suizhou, Yicheng, Baokang County, Fang County, Zhuxi County and Pingli County, before terminating in Ankang.
