= G4215 Chengdu–Zunyi Expressway =

Road in China

Chengdu–Zunyi Expressway
- 成都－遵义高速公路
- Rongzun Expressway 蓉遵高速公路

Route information
- Auxiliary route of G42

Major junctions
- North end: G5 in Jinjiang District, Chengdu, Sichuan
- South end: G75 in Honghuagang District, Zunyi, Guizhou

Location
- Country: China

Highway system
- National Trunk Highway System; Primary; Auxiliary; National Highways; Transport in China
← G4213	→ G4216

The G4215 Chengdu–Zunyi Expressway (Chinese: 成都—遵义高速公路), also referred to as the Rongzun Expressway (Chinese: 蓉遵高速公路), is an expressway in China that connects the cities of Chengdu, Sichuan to Zunyi, Guizhou.

== Route ==
The expressway starts in Chengdu, and passes through Renshou County, Zigong, Luzhou, Chishui, Xishui County and Renhuai, before terminating in Zunyi.
