= Wudang District =

Wudang 乌当区
- District
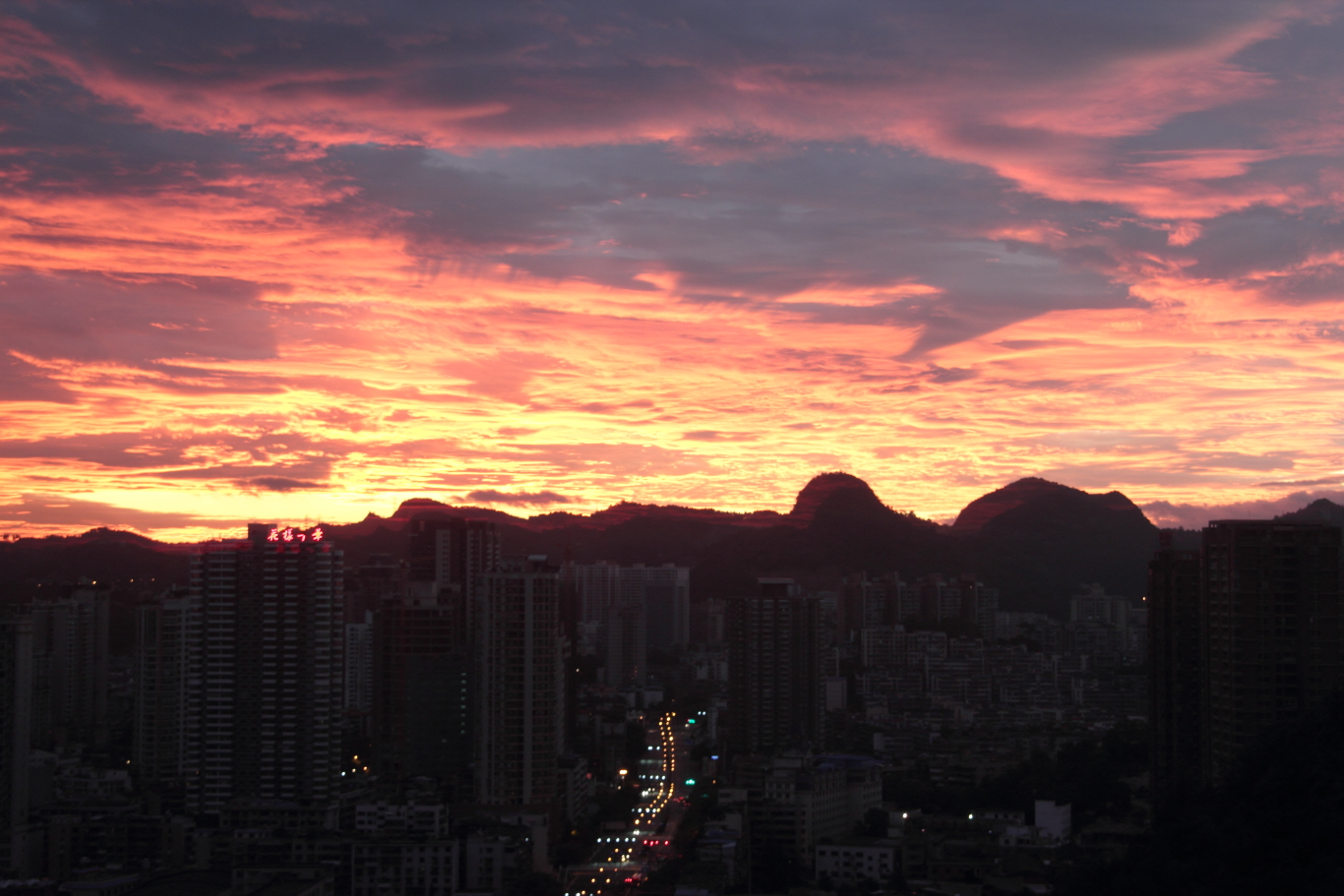

- Location of the seat in Guizhou Wudang (Southwest China)
- Coordinates (Wudang District government): 26°37′51″N 106°45′03″E
- Country: China
- Province: Guizhou
- Prefecture-level city: Guiyang
- District seat: Guanxilu Subdistrict

Area
  - Total: 686 km^{2} (265 sq mi)

Population (2020 census)
  - Total: 336,363
  - Density: 490/km^{2} (1,270/sq mi)
- Time zone: UTC+8 (China Standard)
- Website: www.gzwd.gov.cn

Wudang District (simplified Chinese: 乌当区; traditional Chinese: 烏當區; pinyin: Wūdāng Qū) is one of 6 urban districts of the prefecture-level city of Guiyang, the capital of Guizhou Province, Southwest China.

== Administrative divisions ==
Wudang District is divided into 5 subdistricts, 6 towns and 2 ethnic townships:

- Guanxilu Subdistrict (观溪路街道)
- Xinguanglu Subdistrict (新光路街道)
- Xinchuanglu Subdistrict (新创路街道)
- Longguanglu Subdistrict (龙广路街道)
- Gaoxinlu Subdistrict (高新路街道)
- Dongfeng Town (东风镇)
- Shuitian Town (水田镇)
- Yangchang Town (羊昌镇)
- Xiaba Town (下坝镇)
- Xinchang Town (新场镇)
- Baiyi Town (百宜镇)
- Xinbao Bouyei Ethnic Township (新堡布依族乡)
- Pianpo Bouyei Ethnic Township (偏坡布依族乡)

== Climate ==
Climate data for Wudang District, elevation 1,104 m (3,622 ft), (1991–2020 normals, extremes 1981–2010)
| Month | Jan | Feb | Mar | Apr | May | Jun | Jul | Aug | Sep | Oct | Nov | Dec | Year |
|---|---|---|---|---|---|---|---|---|---|---|---|---|---|
| Record high °C (°F) | 22.8 (73.0) | 30.2 (86.4) | 31.3 (88.3) | 34.1 (93.4) | 34.4 (93.9) | 34.5 (94.1) | 35.2 (95.4) | 34.7 (94.5) | 34.2 (93.6) | 31.1 (88.0) | 26.2 (79.2) | 24.3 (75.7) | 35.2 (95.4) |
| Mean daily maximum °C (°F) | 8.2 (46.8) | 11.7 (53.1) | 16.2 (61.2) | 21.5 (70.7) | 24.4 (75.9) | 26.2 (79.2) | 28.4 (83.1) | 28.7 (83.7) | 25.7 (78.3) | 20.2 (68.4) | 16.2 (61.2) | 10.6 (51.1) | 19.8 (67.7) |
| Daily mean °C (°F) | 4.6 (40.3) | 7.3 (45.1) | 11.2 (52.2) | 16.2 (61.2) | 19.5 (67.1) | 21.9 (71.4) | 23.8 (74.8) | 23.5 (74.3) | 20.6 (69.1) | 16.0 (60.8) | 11.7 (53.1) | 6.6 (43.9) | 15.2 (59.4) |
| Mean daily minimum °C (°F) | 2.4 (36.3) | 4.5 (40.1) | 8.0 (46.4) | 12.7 (54.9) | 15.9 (60.6) | 18.9 (66.0) | 20.7 (69.3) | 20.0 (68.0) | 17.2 (63.0) | 13.2 (55.8) | 8.7 (47.7) | 4.0 (39.2) | 12.2 (53.9) |
| Record low °C (°F) | −7.8 (18.0) | −6.6 (20.1) | −3.5 (25.7) | 0.1 (32.2) | 6.3 (43.3) | 10.4 (50.7) | 12.1 (53.8) | 13.1 (55.6) | 8.1 (46.6) | 3.3 (37.9) | −2.4 (27.7) | −6.6 (20.1) | −7.8 (18.0) |
| Average precipitation mm (inches) | 28.7 (1.13) | 22.9 (0.90) | 44.8 (1.76) | 82.3 (3.24) | 172.6 (6.80) | 227.7 (8.96) | 201.1 (7.92) | 125.6 (4.94) | 85.3 (3.36) | 94.2 (3.71) | 41.1 (1.62) | 22.1 (0.87) | 1,148.4 (45.21) |
| Average precipitation days (≥ 0.1 mm) | 15.4 | 12.7 | 15.4 | 15.2 | 16.6 | 16.8 | 15.6 | 14.1 | 10.8 | 15.0 | 11.0 | 12.9 | 171.5 |
| Average snowy days | 4.2 | 2.4 | 0.6 | 0 | 0 | 0 | 0 | 0 | 0 | 0 | 0.1 | 1.5 | 8.8 |
| Average relative humidity (%) | 83 | 78 | 78 | 76 | 77 | 82 | 79 | 77 | 77 | 81 | 80 | 78 | 79 |
| Mean monthly sunshine hours | 35.0 | 55.4 | 81.6 | 107.7 | 120.0 | 98.8 | 156.1 | 171.3 | 131.5 | 82.0 | 77.1 | 53.6 | 1,170.1 |
| Percentage possible sunshine | 11 | 17 | 22 | 28 | 29 | 24 | 37 | 43 | 36 | 23 | 24 | 17 | 26 |
Source: China Meteorological Administration

== Transportation ==
Three railway stations are situated in the District:

- Guiyang East railway station, one of two major railway stations in Guiyang and an interchange between multiple lines
- Luowansanjiang and Baiyi, both intermediate stops on the Guiyang–Kaiyang intercity railway
