= G4216 Chengdu–Lijiang Expressway =

Road in China

Chengdu–Lijiang Expressway
- 成都－丽江高速公路
- Rongli Expressway 蓉丽高速公路

Route information
- Auxiliary route of G42

Major junctions
- North end: G5 in Jinjiang District, Chengdu, Sichuan
- South end: G5611 in Yulong Naxi Autonomous County, Lijiang, Yunnan

Location
- Country: China

Highway system
- National Trunk Highway System; Primary; Auxiliary; National Highways; Transport in China
← G4215	→ G4217

The G4216 Chengdu–Lijiang Expressway (Chinese: 成都—丽江高速公路), also referred to as the Rongli Expressway (Chinese: 蓉丽高速公路), is an expressway in China that connects the cities of Chengdu, Sichuan to Lijiang, Yunnan.

== Route ==
The expressway starts in Chengdu, and passes through Renshou County, Muchuan County, Jinyang County, Huidong County and Panzhihua, before terminating in Lijiang.
