= G93 Chengyu Ring Expressway =

Beltway in Sichuan, China

Chengyu Ring Expressway
- 成渝地区环线高速公路
- Chengyu Ring Expressway 成渝环线高速

Route information
- Length: 1,057 km (657 mi) Length when complete.

Major junctions
- Orbital around Chongqing and Chengdu, Sichuan

Location
- Country: China

Highway system
- National Trunk Highway System; Primary; Auxiliary; National Highways; Transport in China
← G9221	→ G94

The Chengyu Ring Expressway (simplified Chinese: 成渝环线高速; traditional Chinese: 成渝環線高速), officially the Chengyu Region Ring Expressway (simplified Chinese: 成渝地区环线高速公路; traditional Chinese: 成渝地區環線高速公路) and designated G93, is an expressway encircling the cities of Chongqing and Chengdu, Sichuan, in China. When complete, it will be 1,057 km (657 mi) in length.

The highway is named using the one-character abbreviations cheng and yu, for Chengdu and Chongqing respectively.

== Route ==
Clockwise from Chengdu, the expressway connects the following cities:

- Chengdu, Sichuan
- Mianyang, Sichuan
- Suining, Sichuan
- Chongqing
- Luzhou, Sichuan
- Yibin, Sichuan
- Leshan, Sichuan
- Ya'an, Sichuan
- Back to Chengdu

Currently, sections from Mianyang to Ya'an through Chengdu and from Suining to Chongqing are complete.
