= G85 Yinchuan–Kunming Expressway =

Expressway in China

Yinchuan–Kunming Expressway
- 银川－昆明高速公路
- Yinkun Expressway 银昆高速公路

Route information
- Length: 2,332 km (1,449 mi)

Major junctions
- North end: Binhe New Area exit, Xingqing District, Yinchuan
- South end: Xiaozhuang Interchange, North 2nd Ring Road, Kunming, Yunnan

Location
- Country: China

Highway system
- National Trunk Highway System; Primary; Auxiliary; National Highways; Transport in China
← G8013	→ G8511

The Yinchuan–Kunming Expressway (Chinese: 银川－昆明高速公路), designated as G85 and commonly referred to as the Yinkun Expressway (Chinese: 银昆高速公路) is an expressway in China that connects the cities of Yinchuan, Ningxia and Kunming, Yunnan. It is 2,332 km (1,449 mi) in length. The full length was completed and opened for traffic in 2024.

It is one of the National Trunk Highway System's 11 north-south main routes.

It passes through the following major cities:

- Yinchuan, Ningxia
- Guyuan, Ningxia
- Pingliang, Gansu
- Baoji, Shaanxi
- Hanzhong, Shaanxi
- Bazhong, Sichuan
- Guang'an, Sichuan
- Chongqing
- Neijiang, Sichuan
- Yibin, Sichuan
- Zhaotong, Yunnan
- Kunming, Yunnan

== Gallery ==
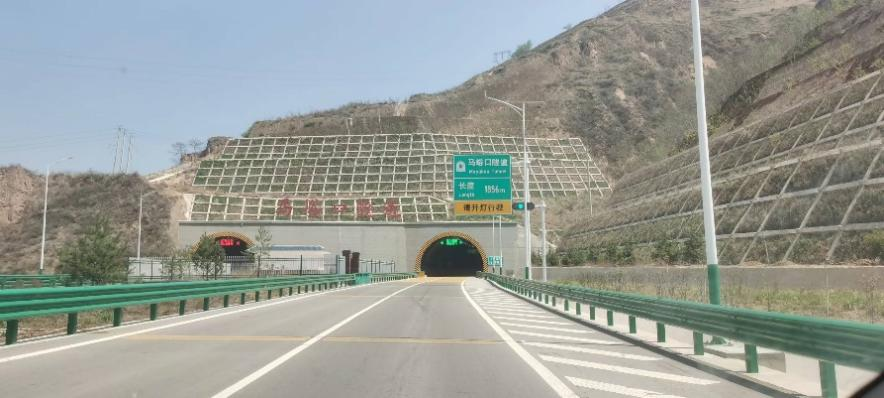
Mayukou Tunnel in Pingliang, Gansu

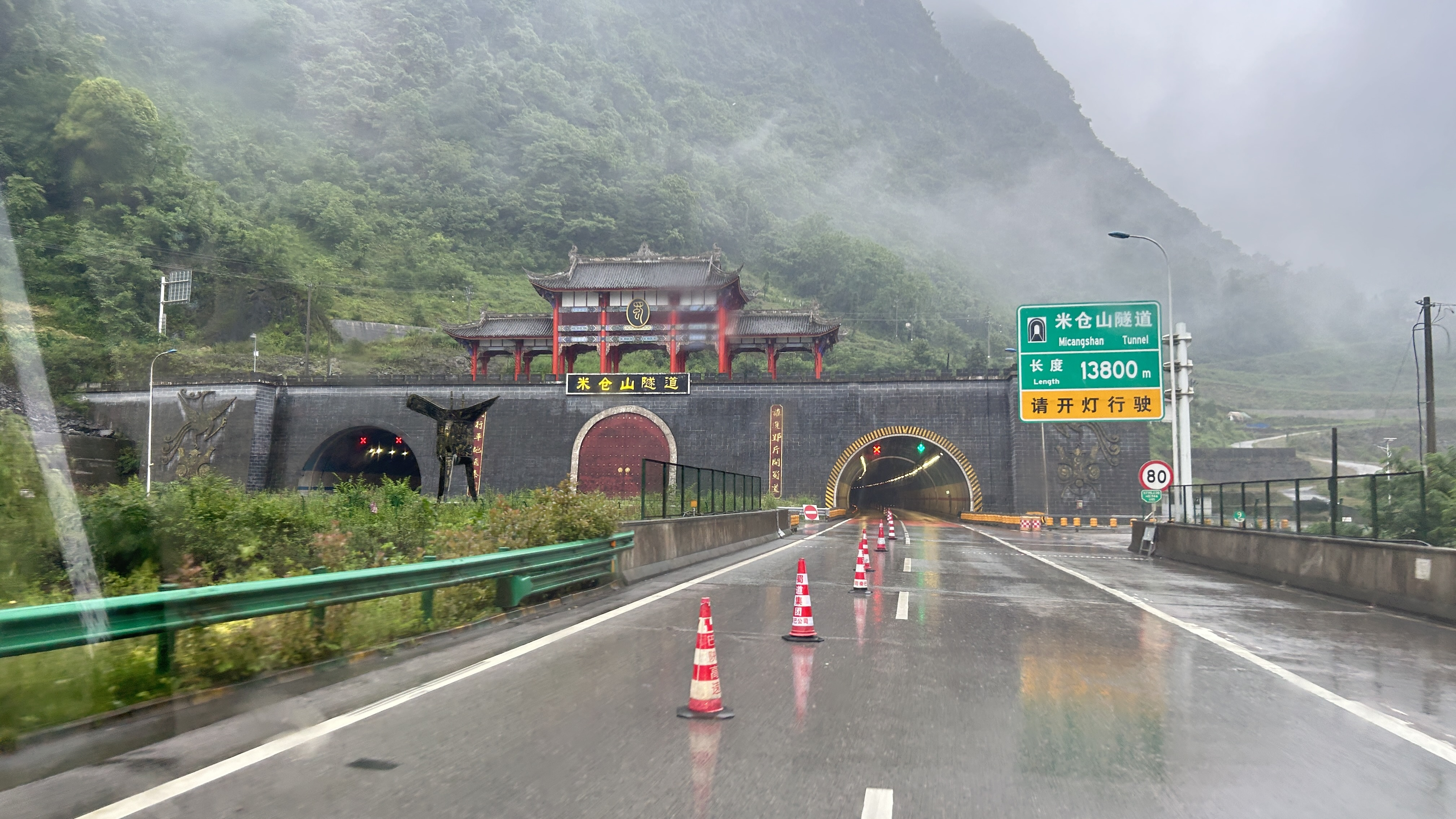
Micangshan Tunnel in Nanjiang County, Sichuan

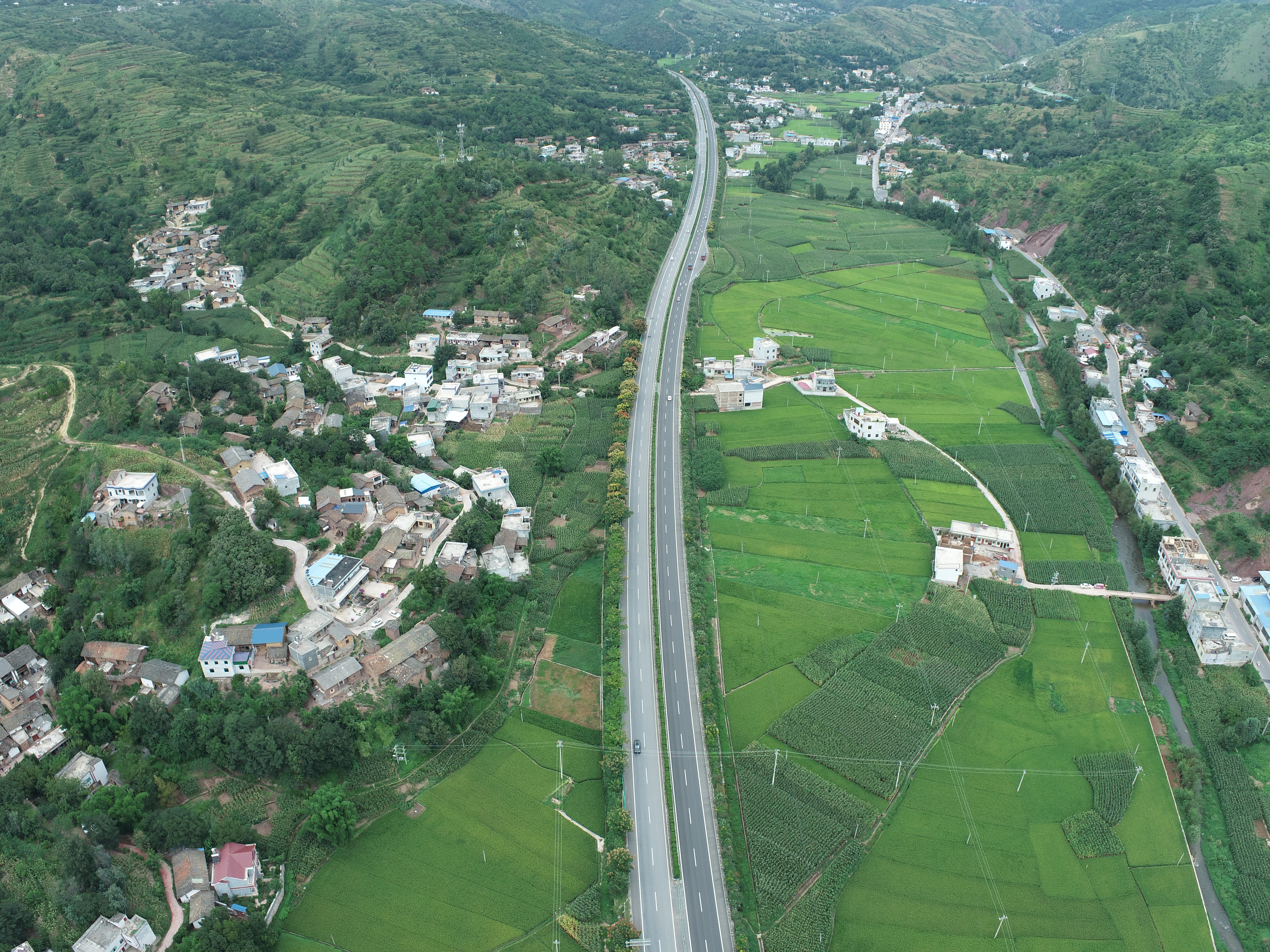
In Huize, Yunnan
