= Expressways of Guangdong =

Expressway network in Guangdong Province of China

Provincial Expressways in Guangdong
- GD provincial expressway marker

- Map of provincial expressways in Guangdong

Highway names
- GD Provincial: SXXXX (green)

System links
- Transport in China

Expressways in Guangdong are a major form of transportation in Guangdong province. The network consists of national expressways assigned by National Trunk Highway System in China and provincial expressways assigned by Guangdong Expressway system. Expressways in Guangdong usually need a fare of 0.45 CNY/km (about 0.72 CNY/mile) for a private car due to the provincial standard, while more needed for a larger vehicle. Speed limits also vary with the type of vehicles that usually ranged from 60–120 km/h (37–75 mph).

The first expressway in Guangdong is the Guangfo Expressway, opened in 1989. In 2014, the mileage of expressways in the province exceeded 6,000 km (3,700 mi), ranking first in the country. Then it exceeded 7,000 km (4,300 mi) in 2015, reaching every county or county-level city in the region. In 2016, the construction plan completed an investment of 85 billion CNY, including 782 km of 15 new projects, 3,583 km of continued construction, and 716 km of 9 projects that were opened to traffic. As of late 2022, the network length exceeded 11,000 kilometers, reaching 11,211 km (6,966 mi), ranking first in the country for 9 consecutive years, and the average network density is about 62.39 km/1000 km², also ranking first among the standard provinces in China.

== List of routes ==
=== National expressways ===
| Name and number | Abbreviated name | Name in Simplified Chinese | Termini in Guangdong | | Length (Guangdong section) | Status |
|---|---|---|---|---|---|---|
| G4 (Beijing–Hong Kong and Macau Expressway) | Jinggang'ao Expressway | 京港澳高速公路 | Xiaotang | Huanggang Port | 463.94 km (288.28 mi) | Fully completed |
| G0412 (Shenzhen–Nanning Expressway) | Shennan Expressway | 深南高速公路 | Qianhai | Guangxi border | | Proposed |
| G0421 (Xuchang–Guangzhou Expressway) | Xuguang Expressway | 许广高速公路 | Jingkou | Guangqing | 287.15 km (178.43 mi) | Fully completed |
| G0422 (Wuhan–Shenzhen Expressway) | Wushen Expressway | 武深高速公路 | Renhua | Yantian Port | 352.4 km (219.0 mi) | Fully completed |
| G0423 (Lechang–Guangzhou Expressway) | Leguang Expressway | 乐广高速公路 | Pingshi | Huashan | 271 km (168 mi) | Fully completed |
| G0425 (Guangzhou–Macau Expressway) | Guang'ao Expressway | 广澳高速公路 | Guangzhou | Zhuhai | 177 km (110 mi) | Fully completed |
| G15 (Shenyang–Haikou Expressway) | Shenhai Expressway | 沈海高速公路 | Fenshui Pass | Xuwen Port | 1,102 km (685 mi) | Fully completed |
| G1508 (Guangzhou Ring Expressway) | | 广州绕城高速公路 | | | 195 km (121 mi) | Fully completed |
| G1523 (Ningbo–Dongguan Expressway) | Yongguan Expressway | 甬莞高速公路 | Fengtang | Dongshan | 350 km (220 mi) | Fully completed |
| G1532 (Quanzhou–Meizhou Expressway) | Quanmei Expressway | 泉梅高速公路 | Chengjiang | Longyan (Fujian border) | 84.94 km (52.78 mi) | Fully completed |
| G1535 (Nanchang–Chaozhou Expressway) | Nanchao Expressway | 南潮高速公路 | Jiangxi Border | Xiangqiao | | Partially completed |
| G1536 (Dongguan-Guangzhou Expressway) | Guan'guang Expressway | 莞广高速公路 | Dongguan | Panyu | | Proposed |
| G25 (Changchun–Shenzhen Expressway) | Changshen Expressway | 长深高速公路 | Jiaoling | Liantang | 524.5 km (325.9 mi) | Fully completed |
| G2518 (Shenzhen–Cenxi Expressway) | Shencen Expressway | 深岑高速公路 | Shenzhen Airport | Mocun | 320.68 km (199.26 mi) | Partially completed |
| G35 (Jinan–Guangzhou Expressway) | Jiguang Expressway | 济广高速公路 | Bachi | Luogang | | Fully completed |
| G45 (Daqing–Guangzhou Expressway) | Daguang Expressway | 大广高速公路 | Lianping | Banghu | 227.21 km (141.18 mi) | Fully completed |
| G4511 (Longnan–Heyuan Expressway) | Longhe Expressway | 龙河高速公路 | Jiangxi border | Puqian | | Fully completed |
| G55 (Erenhot–Guangzhou Expressway) | Erguang Expressway | 二广高速公路 | Lianzhou | Yayao | 320.24 km (198.99 mi) | Fully completed |
| G6011 (Nanchang–Shaoguan Expressway) | Nanshao Expressway | 南韶高速公路 | Shaoguan | Ganzhou | 125.3 km (77.9 mi) | Fully completed |
| G65 (Baotou–Maoming Expressway) | Baomao Expressway | 包茂高速公路 | Chenjinding | Lintou | 121.4 km (75.4 mi) | Fully completed |
| G75 (Lanzhou–Haikou Expressway) | Lanhai Expressway | 兰海高速公路 | Gaoqiao | Xuwen Port | 203.34 km (126.35 mi) | Fully completed |
| G78 (Shantou–Kunming Expressway) | Shankun Expressway | 汕昆高速公路 | Waisha | Guangxi border | 672.8 km (418.1 mi) | Fully completed |
| G80 (Guangzhou–Kunming Expressway) | Guangkun Expressway | 广昆高速公路 | Hengjiang | Pingtai | 191 km (119 mi) | Fully completed |
| G94 (Pearl River Delta Ring Expressway) | | 珠三角环线高速 | | | 460 km (290 mi) | Fully completed |
| G9411 (Dongguan–Foshan Expressway) | Guanfo Expressway | 莞佛高速公路 | Humen | Gaoming | 152 km (94 mi) | Fully completed |

=== Provincial expressways ===
| Number | Name | Chinese Name | Startpoint | Endpoint | Length | Formed | Notes |
|---|---|---|---|---|---|---|---|
| Guangdong S1 | Guanglian Expressway | 广连高速 | Guangzhou | Lianzhou | | | |
| Guangdong S2 | Guanghe Expressway | 广河高速 | Guangzhou | Huizhou | 156 km (97 mi) | 2012 | |
| Guangdong S3 | Guangshen Riverbank Expressway | 广深沿江高速 | Guangzhou | Shenzhen | 88 km (55 mi) | 2013 | |
| Guangdong S4 | Huanan Expressway | 华南快速 | Panyu | Baiyun | 30 km (19 mi) | 2009 | |
| Guangdong S5 | Guangtai Expressway | 广台高速 | Guangzhou | Taishan | 134 km (83 mi) | 2014 | |
| Guangdong S6 | Guanglong Expressway | 广龙高速 | Guangzhou | Jiangmen | 49 km (30 mi) | 2016 | |
| Guangdong S0612 | Guanglong Longxun Branch Expressway | 广龙高速龙寻支线 | Longchuan | Xunwu | 9.419 km (5.853 mi) | 2017 | |
| Guangdong S8 | Guangfozhao Expressway | 广佛肇高速 | Guangzhou | Wuzhou | 221 km (137 mi) | 2016 | |
| Guangdong S9 | Guanglian West Expressway | 广连西线高速 | Guangzhou | Lianzhou | 224 km (139 mi) | 2026 | |
| Guangdong S10 | Xiongxin Expressway | 雄信高速 | | | | | |
| Guangdong S11 | Dachao Expressway | 大潮高速 | | | | | |
| Guangdong S12 | Meilong Expressway | 梅龙高速 | | | | | Future G1532 |
| Guangdong S1211 | Meilong Expressway Meizhou East Branch | 梅龙高速梅州东联络线 | | | | | |
| Guangdong S13 | Jiehui Expressway | 揭惠高速 | | | | | |
| Guangdong S14 | Shanzhan Expressway | 汕湛高速 | Shantou | Zhanjiang | | | |
| Guangdong S1408 | Shanzhan Expressway Zhanjiang Airport Branch | 汕湛高速湛江机场支线 | | | | | |
| Guangdong S15 | Guangfo Expressway | 广佛高速 | Guangzhou | Foshan | | | |
| Guangdong S16 | Foqingcong Expressway | 佛清从高速 | | | | | |
| Guangdong S17 | Jiepuhui Expressway | 揭普惠高速 | | | | | |
| Guangdong S18 | Huaguan Expressway | 花莞高速 | | | | 2017 | |
| Guangdong S19 | Meishan Expressway | 梅汕高速 | | | | 2010 | |
| Guangdong S20 | Guangzhongjiang Expressway | 广中江高速 | | | | 2017 | |
| Guangdong S21 | Guanghui Expressway | 广惠高速 | | | | 2010 | |
| Guangdong S22 | Huitang Expressway | 惠塘高速 | | | | | |
| Guangdong S23 | Huida Expressway | 惠大高速 | | | | 2010 | |
| Guangdong S24 | Guanzhong Expressway | 莞中高速 | | | | 2017 | |
| Guangdong S25 | Huixia Expressway | 惠霞高速 | Huicheng | Xiayong | 64.29 km (39.95 mi) | 2026 | |
| Guangdong S26 | Zhongyang Expressway | 中阳高速 | | | | 2017 | |
| Guangdong S27 | Shaohui Expressway | 韶惠高速 | | | | 2017 | |
| Guangdong S28 | Shuiguan Expressway | 水官高速 | | | | 2010 | |
| Guangdong S29 | Congguanshen Expressway | 从莞深高速 | Guangzhou | Shenzhen | | 2010 | |
| Guangdong S30 | Huishen Coastal Expressway | 惠深沿海高速 | Huizhou | Shenzhen | 89 km (55 mi) | 2010 | |
| Guangdong S3012 | Renping Ring Expressway | 稔平环岛高速 | Xunliaowan | Jilong | | 2025 | |
| Guangdong S31 | Longda Expressway | 龙大高速 | Dongguan | Shenzhen | | 2007 | |
| Guangdong S32 | Western Coastal Expressway | 西部沿海高速 | | | | 2010 | |
| Guangdong S3211 | Zhuhai Airport Expressway | 珠海机场高速 | | | | 2012 | |
| Guangdong S3213 | Gaolan Port Expressway | 高栏港高速 | | | | 2012 | |
| Guangdong S3218 | Western Coastal Expressway Yangjiang South Branch | 阳江南联络线 | | | | 2017 | |
| Guangdong S33 | Nanguang Expressway | 南光高速 | Nanshan | | | 2010 | |
| Guangdong S34 | Xianghai Expressway | 香海高速 | | | | 2017 | |
| Guangdong S36 | Zhutai Expressway | 珠台高速 | | | | 2017 | |
| Guangdong S37 | Lianhuashan Bridge | 莲花山大桥 | | | | | Future G1536 |
| Guangdong S38 | Jinhai Expressway | 金海高速 | | | | 2017 | |
| Guangdong S39 | Dongxin Expressway | 东新高速 | | | | | |
| Guangdong S40 | Luoxin Expressway | 罗信高速 | | | | | |
| Guangdong S41 | Guangzhou Airport Expressway | 广州机场高速 | | | | | |
| Guangdong S42 | Hualian Expressway | 化廉高速 | | | | | |
| Guangdong S43 | Guangzhu West Expressway | 广珠西线高速 | | | | | |
| Guangdong S45 | Congpu Expressway | 从埔高速 | | | | | |
| Guangdong S46 | Wuzhan Expressway | 吴湛高速 | | | | | |
| Guangdong S47 | Guangfojiangzhu Expressway | 广佛江珠高速 | | | | | |
| Guangdong S49 | Xintai Expressway | 新台高速 | | | | | |
| Guangdong S50 | Donglei Expressway | 东雷高速 | | | | | |
| Guangdong S51 | Luoyang Expressway | 罗阳高速 | | | | | |
| Guangdong S52 | Wushigang Expressway | 乌石港高速 | | | | | |
| Guangdong S53 | Zhongshan West Ring Expressway | 中山西环高速 | | | | | |
| Guangdong S5311 | Zhongshan West Ring Expressway Xiaolan Branch | 中山西环高速小榄支线 | | | | | |
| Guangdong S55 | Guangsan Expressway | 广三高速 | Guangzhou | Foshan | | | |
| Guangdong S57 | Zhaotai Expressway | 肇台高速 | | | | | |
| Guangdong S59 | Huaiyu Expressway | 怀郁高速 | | | | | |
| Guangdong S60 | Lianhe Expressway | 连贺高速 | | | | | |
| Guangdong S61 | Maoming Port Expressway | 茂名港高速 | | | | | |
| Guangdong S63 | Yuzhan Expressway | 玉湛高速 | | | | | |
| Guangdong S6311 | Yuzhan Expressway Zhanjiang North Branch | 玉湛高速湛江北支线 | | | | | |
| Guangdong S66 | Meiping Expressway | 梅平高速 | | | | | Future G1535 |
| Guangdong S68 | Dafenghua Expressway | 大丰华高速 | | | | | |
| Guangdong S70 | Zengfo Expressway | 增佛高速 | | | | | |
| Guangdong S73 | Nansha Port Expressway | 南沙港快速 | | | | | |
| Guangdong S76 | Huanglan Expressway | 黄榄快速 | Nansha | Shunde | 30 km (19 mi) | 2017 | |
| Guangdong S77 | Zhongshan East Ring Expressway | 中山东环高速 | | | | | |
| Guangdong S78 | Nanzhong Expressway | 南中高速 | | | | | |
| Guangdong S7811 | Nanzhong Expressway Wanqingsha Branch | 南中高速万顷沙联络线 | | | | | |
| Guangdong S79 | Yinzhou Lake Expressway | 银洲湖高速 | | | | 2026 | |
| Guangdong S81 | Guangzhou Ring Expressway | 广州环城高速 | | | | 1993 | |
| Guangdong S8111 | Guangzhou Ring Expressway Xinhua Branch | 广州环城高速新化连接线 | | | | 2021 | |
| Guangdong S8116 | Guangzhou Ring Expressway Guangnan Branch | 广州环城高速广南连接线 | | | | 2025 | |
| Guangdong S84 | Shaoguan Ring Expressway | 韶关北环高速 | | | | | |
| Guangdong S85 | Chaoshan Ring Expressway | 潮汕环线高速 | | | | 2017 | |
| Guangdong S8511 | Chaoshan Ring Expressway Jieyang Branch | 潮汕环线揭阳联络线 | | | | 2017 | |
| Guangdong S86 | Shenzhen Ring Expressway | 深圳外环高速 | | | | 2017 | Also G1507 |
| Guangdong S88 | Dongguan Ring Expressway | 东莞环城快速 | | | | | |
| Guangdong S8816 | Dongguan Ring Expressway | 东莞环城快速石鼓连接线 | | | | | |
| Guangdong S102 | Guangyuan Expressway | 广园高速 | | | | 2010 | Future S74 |
| Guangdong S110 | Guangqing Expressway | 广清高速 | | | | | |
| Guangdong S203 | Danping Expressway | 丹平快速 | | | | 2010 | Future S2911 |
| Guangdong S301 | Nanping Expressway | 南坪快速 | | | | 2010 | Future S28 |
| Guangdong S9911 | Yongguan Expressway Chaozhou East Branch | 甬莞高速潮州东联络线 | | | | | Future G1535 |
| Guangdong S9912 | Shenhai Expressway Chao'an Branch | 沈海高速潮安联络线 | | | | | |
| Guangdong S9915 | Shenhai Expressway Haifeng West Branch | 沈海高速海丰西联络线 | | | | | |
| Guangdong S9917 | Wushen Expressway Shixing Branch | 武深高速始兴联络线 | | | | | |
| Guangdong S9918 | Changhu Expressway Humen Branch | 常虎高速虎门港支线 | | | | 2017 | |
| Guangdong S9919 | Guang'ao Expressway Zhuhai Branch | 广澳高速珠海支线 | Zhongshan | Zhuhai | 5 km (3.1 mi) | 2017 | |
| Guangdong S9925 | Changshen Expressway Huizhou Branch | 长深高速惠州支线 | | | | 2017 | |
| Guangdong S9955 | Erguang Expressway Lianshan Branch | 二广高速连山联络线 | | | | 2017 | |
| Guangdong S9975 | Lanhai Expressway Zhanjiang Branch | 兰海高速湛江支线 | | | | 2017 | |

== Former routes ==
| Number | Name | Chinese Name | Startpoint | Endpoint | Length | Formed | Notes |
|---|---|---|---|---|---|---|---|
| Guangdong S1 | Guangle Expressway | | | | | | Redesignated as G4W3 in 2013, now G0423 |
| Guangdong S4W | Guang'ao Zhuhai Branch Line | | | | | | Renumbered to S9919 in 2017 |
| Guangdong S6 | Guangzhongjiang Expressway | | | | | | Became a portion of S20 in 2017 |
| Guangdong S9 | Guangqinglian Expressway | | | | | | Became a portion of S1 in 2013 |
| Guangdong S10 | Ganshao Expressway | | | | | | Became a portion of G6011 in 2013 |
| Guangdong S18 | Hehuipan Expressway | | | | | | Became a portion of S6 in 2017 |
| Guangdong S20 | Chaoguan Expressway | | | | | | Became a portion of G1523 in 2013 |
| Guangdong S24 | Sha'ao Expressway | | | | | | Became a portion of G1507 in 2017 |
| Guangdong S25 | Changshen Huizhou Branch Line | | | | | | Renumbered to S9925 in 2017 |
| Guangdong S26 | Shenluo Expressway | | | | | | Became a portion of G2518 in 2013 |
| Guangdong S27 | Renshen Expressway | | | | | | Became a portion of G0422 in 2013 |
| Guangdong S34 | Honggao Expressway | | | | | | Became a portion of S36 in 2017 |
| Guangdong S36 | Luoxin Expressway | | | | | | Redesignated as S40 in 2017 |
| Guangdong S38 | Donglei Expressway | | | | | | Redesignated as S50 in 2017 |
| Guangdong S45 | Fojiang Expressway | | | | | | Became a portion of S47 in 2017 |
| Guangdong S59 | Yuzhan Expressway | | | | | | Redesignated as G63 in 2017 |
| Guangdong S75 | Lanhai Zhanjiang Branch Line | | | | | | Renumbered to S9975 in 2017 |
| Guangdong S82 | Foshan 1st Ring Expressway | | | | | | Broke into portions of S5, S8, S16 and S47 |
| Guangdong S83 | Meizhou City Ring Expressway | | | | | | Became a portion of S1211 in 2017 |
| Guangdong S105 | Nansha Port Expressway | | | | | | Redesignated as S73 in 2017 |
| Guangdong S202 | Huiyan Expressway | | | | | | Renumbered as S3011 in 2012 |
| Guangdong S209 | Qingping Expressway | | | | | | Became a portion of S29 in 2017 |
| Guangdong S302 | Huanglan Expressway | | | | | | Redesignated as S76 in 2017 |
| Guangdong S303 | Huanan Expressway | | | | | | Redesignated as S4 in 2017 |
| Guangdong S304 | Changhu Humen Branch Line | | | | | | Became S2011 in 2014, now S9918 |
| Guangdong S1411 | Maominggang Expressway | | | | | | Renumbered to S61 in 2017 |
| Guangdong S1412 | Hualian Expressway | | | | | | Renumbered to S42 in 2017 |
| Guangdong S2011 | Changhu Humen Branch Line | | | | | | Former S304, became S9918 in 2017 |
| Guangdong S3111 | Longda Fulong Branch Line | | | | | | Absorbed into S31 in 2017 |
| Guangdong S8211 | Foshan City Ring North Branch Line | | | | | | Became a portion of S47 in 2017 |
