= G0425 Guangzhou–Macau Expressway =

Expressway in Guangdong and Macau, China

Guangzhou–Macau Expressway
- 广州－澳门高速公路
- Guang'ao Expressway 广澳高速公路
- Guangzhou–Macau Expressway in red.

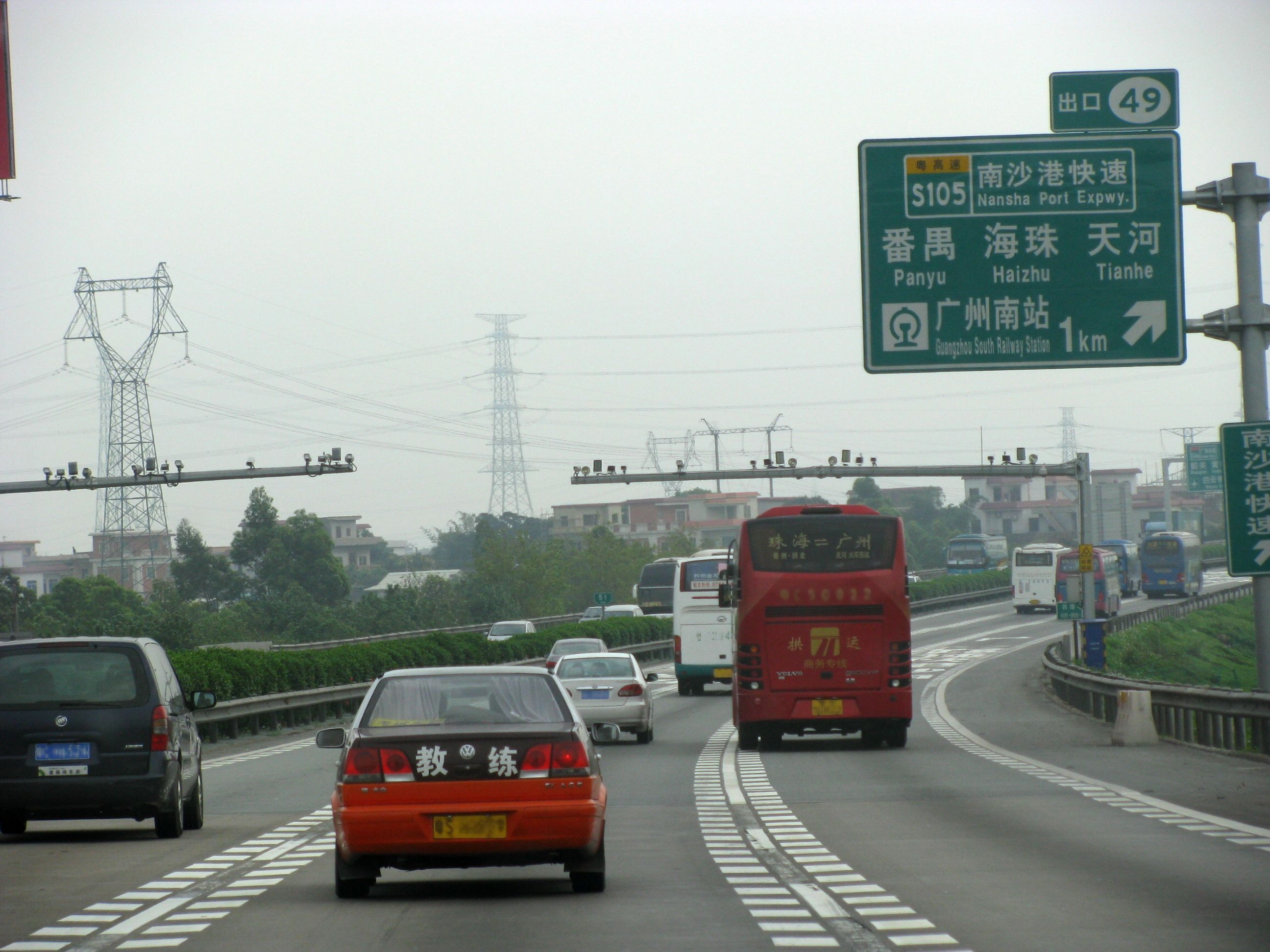
- The expressway approaching the S105 Nansha Port Expressway

Route information
- Auxiliary route of G4
- Length: 153 km (95 mi)

Major junctions
- North end: G4 / G15 / G1508 / Guangdong S15 in Guangzhou, Guangdong
- South end: Macau (when complete); Guangdong S366 in Zhuhai, Guangdong (current)

Location
- Country: China

Highway system
- National Trunk Highway System; Primary; Auxiliary; National Highways; Transport in China
← G0424	→ G5

The Guangzhou–Macau Expressway (Chinese: 广州－澳门高速公路), designated as G0425 and commonly referred to as the Guang'ao Expressway (Chinese: 广澳高速公路), is an expressway that connects the cities of Guangzhou, Guangdong, and Macau, a Special Administrative Region of the People's Republic of China. It is a spur line of the G4 Beijing–Hong Kong and Macau Expressway.

The extension to Macau at the Lotus Bridge is planned, so the current southern terminus is in Zhuhai at Zhuhai Avenue.

The major cities connected by this expressway are:

- Guangzhou, Guangdong
- Zhongshan, Guangdong
- Zhuhai, Guangdong
- Macau

== Exit list ==
North to South
(40)	G4 Jinggang'ao Expressway; G1508 Guangzhou Ring Expressway; S15 Shenhai Expressway Guangzhou Branch
Concurrent with G1508 Guangzhou Ring Expressway
(45)	S102 Guangyuan Expressway
	S3 Guangshenyanjaing Expressway; Hongshan, Huangpu
Huangpu Bridge
(55)	Jinshan Ave; Towards S296 Road; Hualong, Panyu
(58)	Jinshan Ave; G9411 Guanfu Expressway Xinzao, Panyu
Concurrent with G9411 Guanfu Expressway
Toll Station
Guangqiao Service Area
(66)	X302 Road; Asian Games City; Shilou-Shiqi, Panyu Haibang Station
Concurrent with G1508 Guangzhou Ring Expressway
(69)	G1508 Guangzhou Ring Expressway
36	S302 Nansha Port Expressway Extension Branch; S257 Road; Nansha Huangge Auto Town Station
42	S358 Road; Panyu Ave S Huangge Ave S Huangge-Centre, Nansha
Concurrent with G9411 Guanfu Expressway
43	G9411 Guanfu Expressway
46	S111 Road; Hengli-Lanhe-Lingshan, Nansha
49	S105 Nansha Port Expressway
58	S364 Road; Sanjiao-Huangpu
Minzhong Service Area
62	Yangguan Ave; Langwang-Minzhong
68	S26 Shenluo Expressway (To be renamed G2518 Shencen Expressway)
Zhongshan Metropolitan Area
78	Bo'ai 7th Road; Zhongshan S Ring Road; Zhongshan-Centre
Zhongshan Metropolitan Area
89	S111 Road; Cuiheng-Nanlang
Zhuhai Metropolitan Area
93	S4W Guang'ao Expressway Zhuhai Branch; S32 Western Coastal Expressway
Concurrent with S32 Western Coastal Expressway
Zhuhai Metropolitan Area
102	S268 Road; Zhuhai-North
109	G105 Road; S268 Road; Tanzhou
Concurrent with S32 Western Coastal Expressway
114	G94 Pearl River Delta Ring Expressway; S32 Western Coastal Expressway
Concurrent with G94 Pearl River Delta Ring Expressway
126	S366 Road (Zhuhai Avenue); Tanshen S Road; Towards Jinwan-Zhuhai-Centre
Concurrent with G94 Pearl River Delta Ring Expressway
	G94 Pearl River Delta Ring Expressway
Under Construction
Hengqin-Lotus Bridge; Macau
South to North
