= Xihoumen Rail/Road Bridge =

Chinese suspended bridge

Xihoumen Rail/Road Bridge 西堠门公铁两用大桥
- Coordinates: 30°04′59″N 121°53′55″E
- Crosses: Xihoumen Strait
- Locale: Jintang Island–Cezi Island

Characteristics
- Design: Cable-stayed suspension bridge
- Total length: 2,664 m (8,740 ft)
- Height: 294 m (965 ft)
- Longest span: 1,480 m (4,856 ft)
- No. of spans: 3

History
- Constructed by: China Railway Major Bridge Engineering Group Co., Ltd. (CRGL)
- Construction start: 22 December 2020
- Construction end: 2026 (prevision)

Location
- Interactive map of Xihoumen Rail/Road Bridge

The Xihoumen Rail/Road Bridge (Chinese: 西堠门公铁两用大桥) is an under construction suspension bridge over the Xihoumen Strait, China.

The bridge is a dual-use highway and railway bridge, carrying the Ningbo-Zhoushan Railway and the Ningbo-Zhoushan Expressway.

== Locale ==
The Xihoumen Rail/Road Bridge is a transoceanic bridge under construction in Zhoushan City, Zhejiang Province. It is located in Dinghai County, over the Xihoumen Strait, between Jintang Island and Cezi Island, and 2.8 kilometres (1.7 mi) north of the Xihoumen Bridge on the Ningbo-Zhoushan Expressway.

== Description ==
Surpassing the record of the Yavuz Sultan Selim Bridge, also known as the Third Bosphorus Bridge (1,408 m), built by WeBuild, among others, the general contractor for the Messina Bridge, which, however, is only designed for train traffic, and the Tsing Ma Bridge in Hong Kong, which, at 1,377 metres (4,518 ft), is currently the longest rail and road bridge in the world. The new Chinese bridge will then become, in 2026 upon its completion, the world's longest railway suspension bridge (1,488 metres [4,882 ft]).

== See also ==
- List of longest suspension bridge spans - Under construction
- List of bridges in China
- Xihoumen Bridge
- Messina Bridge
