= G9211 Ningbo–Zhoushan Expressway =

Expressway in Zhejiang, China

Ningbo–Zhoushan Expressway
- 宁波－舟山高速公路
- Yongzhou Expressway 甬舟高速

Route information
- Auxiliary route of G92
- Length: 68 km (42 mi)

Major junctions
- West end: G15 Shenyang–Haikou Expressway; G92 Hangzhou Bay Ring Expressway; G1504 Ningbo Ring Expressway, Jiangbei District, Ningbo, Zhejiang (Concurrency sections)
- G1504 Ningbo Ring Expressway, Zhenhai District, Ningbo, Zhejiang
- East end: China National Highway 329, Zhoushan, Zhejiang

Location
- Country: China

Highway system
- National Trunk Highway System; Primary; Auxiliary; National Highways; Transport in China
← G92	→ G9221

The Ningbo−Zhoushan Expressway (simplified Chinese: 宁波−舟山高速公路; traditional Chinese: 寧波−舟山高速公路), commonly referred to as the Yongzhou Expressway (Chinese: 甬舟高速), is an expressway in Zhejiang, China which links Ningbo to Zhoushan. In the National Trunk Highway System (NTHS) in China, the number of this highway is G9211.

The expressway derives its name from the combination of two one-character Chinese abbreviations of both Ningbo and Zhoushan (Ningbo−Yong, Zhoushan−Zhou). Starting from the Qianyang hub on the Ningbo Ring Expressway and ending on the National Highway G329 at Yadanshan Dock, the road can be divided into two parts. The first section which was opened to traffic at the end of 2010, starts from the Qianyang hub and ends at the Jiaochuan hub, which is shared with the Ningbo Ring Expressway. The second section starts from the Jiaochuan hub and ends at the Yadanshan Dock. It contains 5 cross-sea bridges, and was opened to traffic on December 25, 2009.

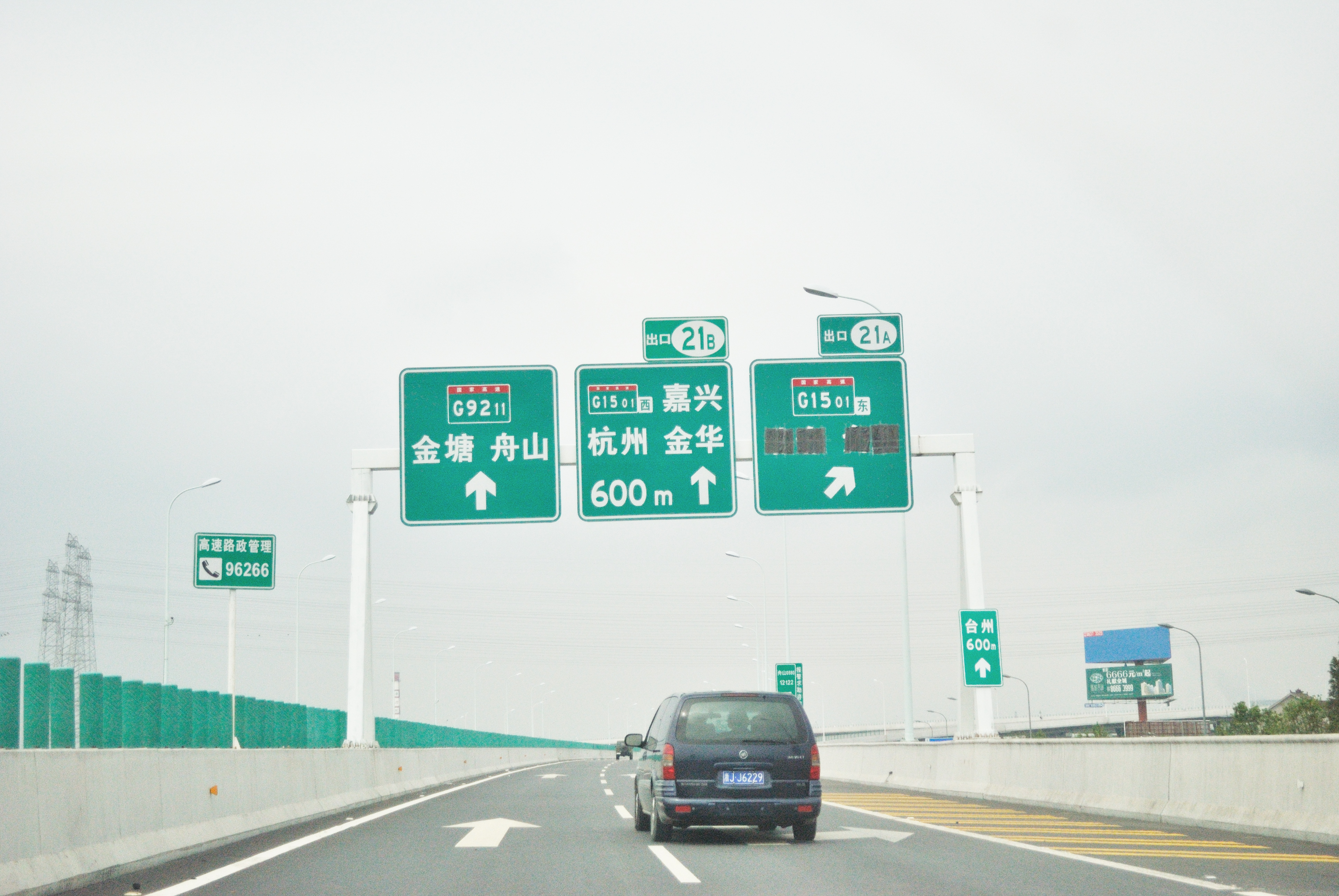

== Construction history ==
The section from Jiaochuan to Yadanshan was called The Project Connecting Zhoushan Islands and Mainland, which have a length of 48 kilometres (30 mi), the largest project that connects islands with mainland in China. The first phase of the project began construction in September 1999 and open to traffic on January 1, 2006. It comprises three bridges: Cengang Bridge, Xiangjiaomen Bridge and Taoyaomen Bridge. The second phase was endorsed by NDRC in China and began construction on May 20. On December 25, 2009, both phases was open to traffic. The section from Qianyang to Baoguosi have a length of 7 kilometres (4.3 mi), began construction in 2005 and finished on December 26, 2007. The section from Baoguosi to Jiaochuanhave a length of 13 kilometres (8.1 mi), began construction on February 27, 2008 and finished in the end of 2010.

== Cross-sea bridges ==
Yongzhou Expressway comprises 5 cross-sea bridges connecting Zhoushan Island, Lidiao Island, Fuchi Island, Cezi Island, Jintang Island and the mainland. Jintang Bridge is the third longest cross-sea bridge in China, after Hangzhou Bay Bridge and Donghai Bridge. It is also the longest cable-stayed bridge built on the sea. Xihoumen Bridge is the second longest suspension bridge in the world, after the Akashi-Kaikyo Bridge in Japan.

=== Cengang bridge ===
Cengang bridge is the first bridge in the project. Crossing Cengang waterway, the bridge connects Zhoushan Island with Lidiao Island. The length of the bridge is 793 metres (2,602 ft) and the bridge has 4 lanes of traffic.

=== Xiangjiaomen Bridge ===
Xiangjiaomen Bridge, the second bridge in the project, crosses Xiangjiaomen waterway. The bridge connects Lidiao Island with Fuchi Island. With a length of 951 metres (3,120 ft) and four lanes of traffic, the bridge has a span of 150 metres (490 ft). Ships of up to 500 tonnes (550 short tons) of displacement can navigate under the bridge safely.

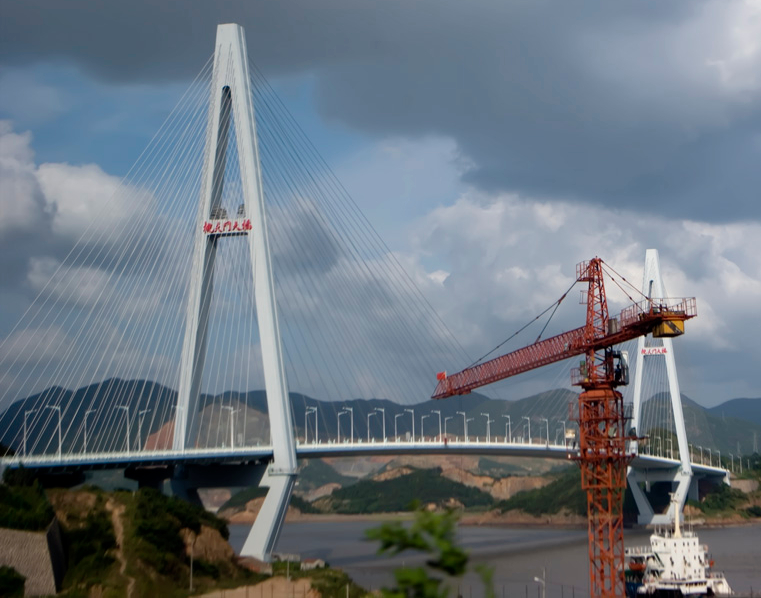
Taoyaomen Bridge

=== Taoyaomen Bridge ===
Taoyaomen Bridge is the third bridge in the project. Ships of up to 2,000 tonnes (2,200 short tons) of displacement can navigate under the bridge safely.

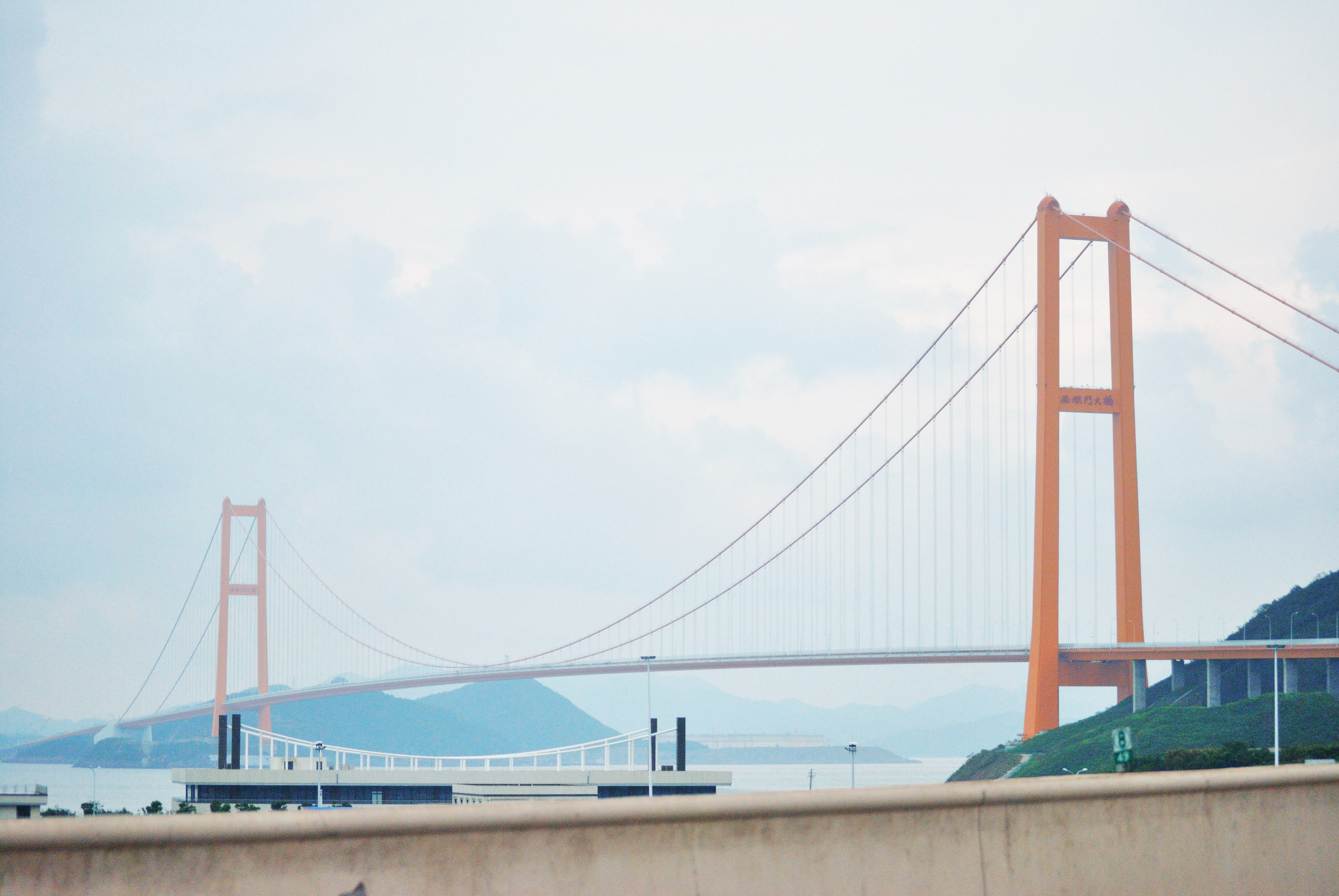
Xihoumen Bridge

=== Xihoumen Bridge ===
Xihoumen Bridge is the fourth bridge in the project. The construction work began in May 2004. The bridge is designed as a suspension bridge and it has the second longest span in the world. Ships of up to 30,000 tonnes (33,000 short tons) of displacement can go navigate under the bridge safely.

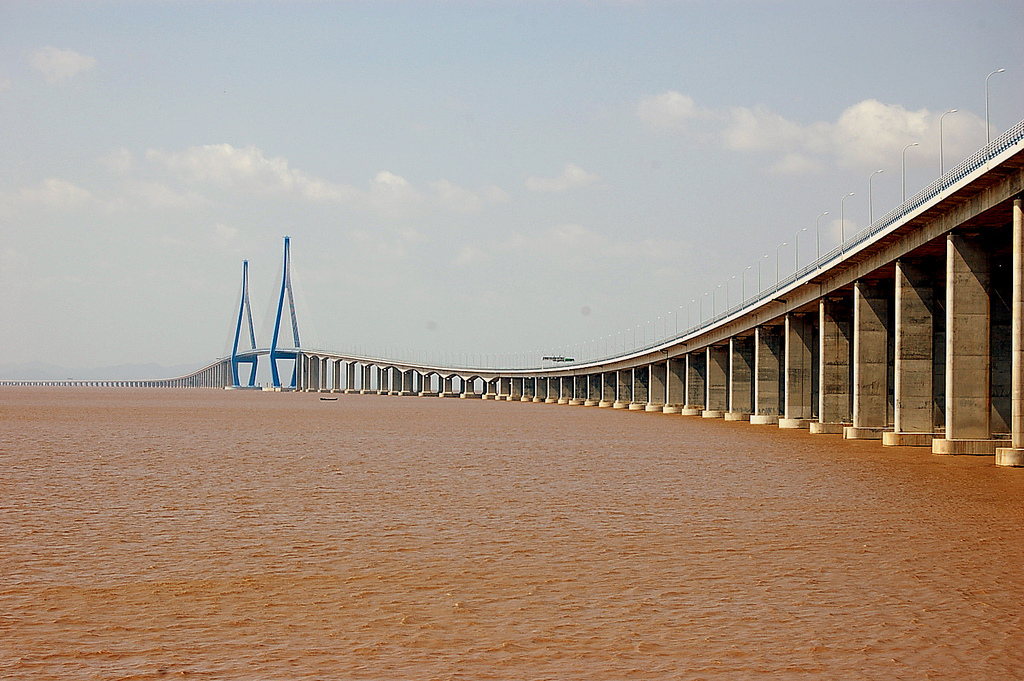
Jintang Bridge

=== Jintang Bridge ===
Jintang Bridge, the fifth in order is the longest in length of all the bridges in the project. The length of the bridge is 18.5 kilometres (11.5 mi). It is the third longest cross-sea bridge built in China. Major ships pass in between the two 620-metre (2,030 ft) high bridge towers. Ships of up to 50,000 tonnes (55,000 short tons) of displacement can navigate under the bridge safely.

== Accidents involving ships ==
Bridges in Yongzhou Expressway are built on straits near the Port of Ningbo, where there is a high volume of sea traffic. Three collisions occurred during the construction of the expressway. On March 28, 2008, a cargo ship registered in Taizhou collided with Jintang Bridge. Part of the bridge was destroyed and four people were killed by falling debris. On January 6, 2009, a construction ship registered in Lianyungang collided with the Taoyaomen Bridge, however, there was no significant damage. On November 16, a ship from South Korea collided with the Jintang Bridge. Though the damage was only minor, the accident delayed the opening of the expressway from November 22 until December 25.

== Controversies ==
=== Island entrance fee ===
After the expressway was opened to traffic, every vehicle traveling on the expressway from Jiaochuan to Zhoushan was required to pay RMB 10 as the Zhoushan Island Vehicle Fee (also called island entrance fee by local residents). It raised disputes in Zhoushan. The administrators state that this fee is used for compensating the construction expenditure of roads in Zhoushan, especially the expressway. As of June 2010, Zhoushan residents are free from this toll, but vehicles from other regions still need to pay the fee.

=== Speed limitations ===
Given the road condition, the speed limitation from Zhoushan to Lidiao toll gate is 60 kilometres per hour (37 mph) while the speed limitation from Lidiao to Cezi toll gate is 80 kilometres per hour (50 mph), which also raises dispute because of the high toll. It is said that the expressway is now under maintenance for higher speed.

== Route ==
Location	km	Number	Name	Destination	Notes
Dinghai District, Zhoushan	0	(1)	Zhoushan (舟山); Also known as Shuangqiao (双桥)	National Highway 329	
Dinghai District, Zhoushan	11	(2)	Cengang (岑港)	Xicen Line	Only available for vehicles heading to Ningbo. No exits available.
Dinghai District, Zhoushan	12	(3)	Lidiao Island (里钓)		Cengang Bridge connects Cengang and Lidiao Island. Only available for vehicles coming from Ningbo direction (exit) or heading to Ningbo (entrance).
Dinghai District, Zhoushan	13	(4)	Fuchi Island (富翅)		Xiangjiaomen Bridge connects Lidiao Island and Fuchi Island
Dinghai District, Zhoushan	13	(5)	Cezi (册子)	Beitao Line	Taoyaomen Bridge connects Fuchi Island and Cezi Island
Dinghai District, Zhoushan	16	(6)	Jintang (金塘)	Dongdong Line	Xihoumen Bridge connects Cezi Island and Jintang
Dinghai District, Zhoushan	16		Jintang Service Area (金塘服务区)		Jitang Service Area locates outside the toll area of the expressway. It provides a panoramic view of Xihoumen Bridge as well as a museum exhibiting the construction process and techniques used in building these cross-sea bridges.
Dinghai District, Zhoushan	20	(7)	Ligang (沥港)	Road towards Jintang Harbor	
Zhenhai District, Ningbo	48	(8)	Jiaochuan (蛟川)	Ningbo Ring Expressway; East Outer Ring Road; Zhenhai Avenue	Jintang Bridge connects Jiaochuan and Ligang. Concurrency with G1501 Ningbo Ring Expressway starts in this station.
Zhenhai District, Ningbo	54	(9)	Shahe (沙河)	Century Avenue	
Zhenhai District, Ningbo	54		Zhenhai Service Area (镇海服务区)		Zhenhai Service Area and Shahe exit shares one exit.
Zhenhai District, Ningbo	58	(10)	Jiulong Lake (九龙湖)	Jiulong Avenue	
Jiangbei District, Ningbo	61	(11)	Baoguo Temple	Ningbo Airport Highway (unbuilt)	
Jiangbei District, Ningbo	68	(12)	Ningbo North (宁波北); Also known as Qianyang (前洋)	Shenhai Expressway; Hangzhou Bay Ring Expressway; Ningbo Ring Expressway; North Outer Ring Road	Concurrency with G1501 Ningbo Ring Expressway ends in this station. This station also concurrent with G15 Shenyang-Haikou Expressway and G92 Hangzhou Bay Ring Expressway.
1.000 mi = 1.609 km; 1.000 km = 0.621 mi: Concurrency terminus

== See also ==
- Xihoumen Rail/Road Bridge
