= G2518 Shenzhen–Cenxi Expressway =

Expressway in China

Shenzhen–Cenxi Expressway
- 深圳－岑溪高速公路
- Shencen Expressway 深岑高速公路

Route information
- Auxiliary route of G25

Major junctions
- West end: G65 / G80 in Cenxi, Wuzhou, Guangxi
- East end: G4 / G15 in Bao'an, Shenzhen, Guangdong

Location
- Country: China

Highway system
- National Trunk Highway System; Primary; Auxiliary; National Highways; Transport in China
← G2517	→ G2519

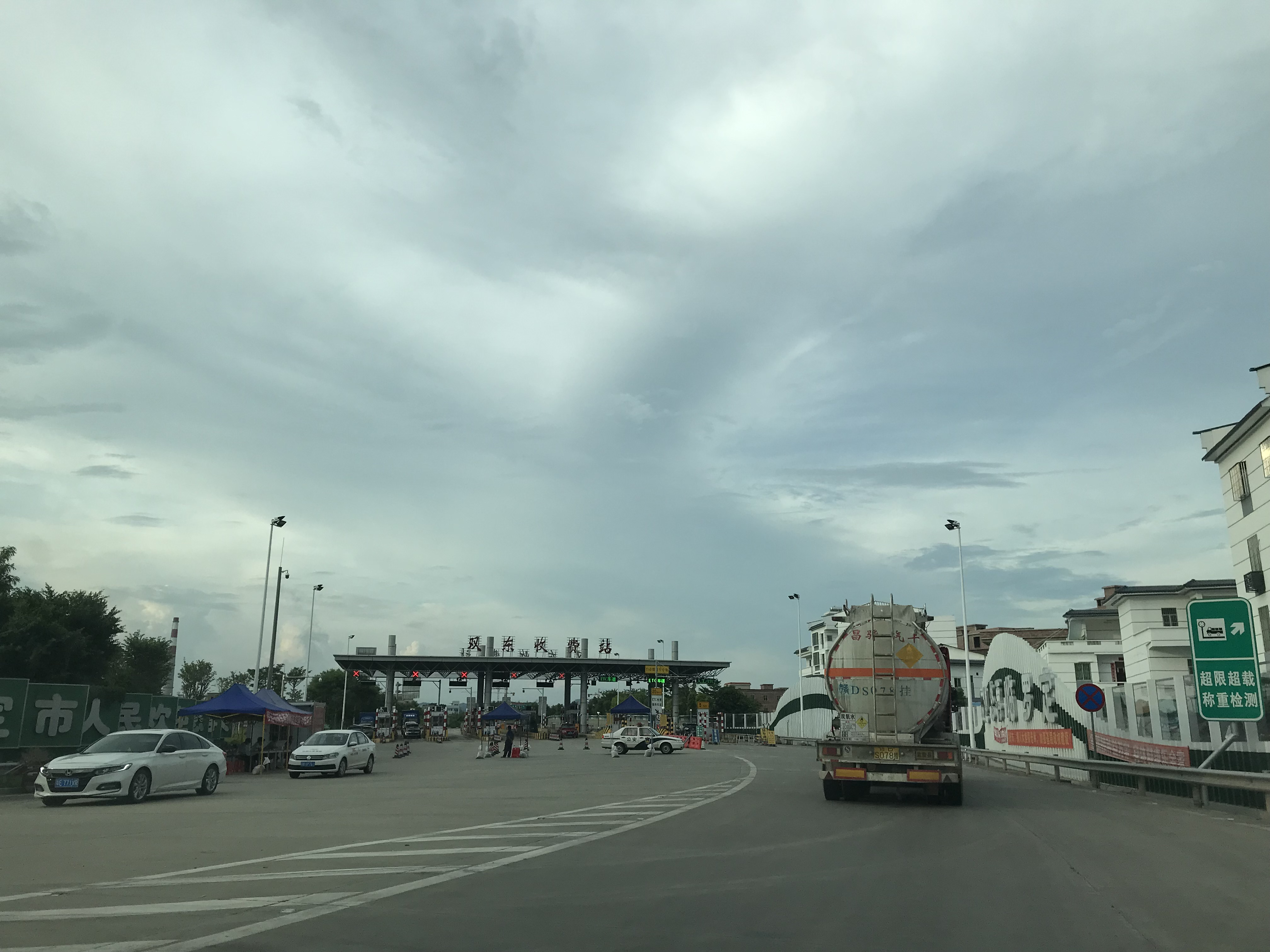
Shuangdong Toll Station

The G2518 Shenzhen–Cenxi Expressway (Chinese: 深圳—岑溪高速公路), commonly referred to as the Shencen Expressway (Chinese: 深岑高速公路), is an expressway in China that connects between the cities Shenzhen, Guangdong to Cenxi, Guangxi.

== Route ==
=== Guangdong ===
The Guangdong section of the Shencen Expressway consists of multiple expressways. It starts from the Hezhou Interchange in Fuyong, Bao'an, Shenzhen, connects with the Guangshen Expressway, passes through the Pearl River Estuary via the Shenzhen–Zhongshan Bridge, passes through Zhongshan and Jiangmen, and ends at Luoding, Yunfu, connecting with the Cenluo Expressway.

Among them, the section from Jiangmen Pengjiang Lianhuashan Interchange to Zhongshan Dongsheng Zhongjiang Interchange is also part of the G94 Pearl River Delta Ring Expressway, this expressway is also connected with the G0425 Guangzhou–Macau Expressway and the G15 Shenyang–Haikou Expressway.

The section in Jiangmen was first opened to traffic in January 1999, with another section opening on 28 October 2005. The section from Luoding to the boundary of Guangdong and Guangxi was officially opened to traffic on 28 December 2013. The Jiangmen to Luoding section was opened to traffic on 28 December 2016, with the opening of the Xinxing-Mocun interchange section in Yunfu.

=== Guangxi ===
The Cenluo Expressway, also known as the Jinzhu-Cenxi Expressway, is an important part of the Cenxi-Baise Expressway in the Guangxi expressway network planning. The route starts from Jinzhu, and passes through Daye, Guiyi, and ends in Tanghua, Cenxi, connecting with the G65 Baotou–Maoming Expressway and the G80 Guangzhou–Kunming Expressway. The total length is 38.574 kilometers with the total estimated investment of the project valued at 1.916 billion yuan, with a design speed of 100 kilometers per hour. Construction started in March 2008 and was completed and opened to traffic on 13 April 2010. Among them, Cenxi East Hub to Cenxi South Hub are part of the G65 Baotou–Maoming Expressway.
