= G1523 Ningbo–Dongguan Expressway =

Expressway in China

Ningbo–Dongguan Expressway
- 宁波－东莞高速公路
- Yongguan Expressway 甬莞高速公路

Route information
- Auxiliary route of G15

Major junctions
- North end: G1504 Yinzhou District, Ningbo, Zhejiang
- South end: G94 / G9411 in Dongguan, Guangdong

Location
- Country: China

Highway system
- National Trunk Highway System; Primary; Auxiliary; National Highways; Transport in China
← G1522	→ G1531

The G1523 Ningbo–Dongguan Expressway (Chinese: 宁波－东莞高速公路), commonly referred to as the Yongguan Expressway (Chinese: 甬莞高速公路), is an expressway in China that connects the cities of Ningbo, in the province of Zhejiang, and Dongguan, in the province of Guangdong. The expressway is a spur of the G15 Shenyang–Haikou Expressway which splits off from the G1504 Expressway at Ningbo and passes through the cities of Taizhou, Wenzhou, Fuzhou, and Xiamen before termainating at the G94 Expressway in Dongguan, Guangdong.
