= G2519 Kangping–Shenyang Expressway =

Road in Liaoning, China

Kangping–Shenyang Expressway
- 康平－沈阳高速公路
- Kangshen Expressway 康沈高速

Route information
- Auxiliary route of G25
- Length: 116.88 km (72.63 mi)

Major junctions
- North end: G25 / Liaoning S17 in Kangping County, Shenyang, Liaoning
- South end: G1 / G1501 in Shenbei New Area, Shenyang, Liaoning

Location
- Country: China

Highway system
- National Trunk Highway System; Primary; Auxiliary; National Highways; Transport in China
← G2518	→ G2531

The G2519 Kangping–Shenyang Expressway (Chinese: 康平—沈阳高速公路), commonly referred to as the Kangshen Expressway (Chinese: 康沈高速), is an expressway in China that connects Kangping County and Shenbei New Area in Shenyang, Liaoning.

== History ==
The first phase to be constructed consisted of the 68.14 kilometer central section. It was opened to traffic on 25 October 2008 with the new expressway designated as the S2 Shenyang-Kangping Expressway.

The second phase consisted of the 24.1 kilometer northern section which opened to traffic on 22 September 2009.

The third and final phase to be completed was the 24.64 kilometer southern section. Construction began on 26 April 2019 and was opened to traffic on 28 October 2021.
