= Centimetre =

Unit of length

centimetre
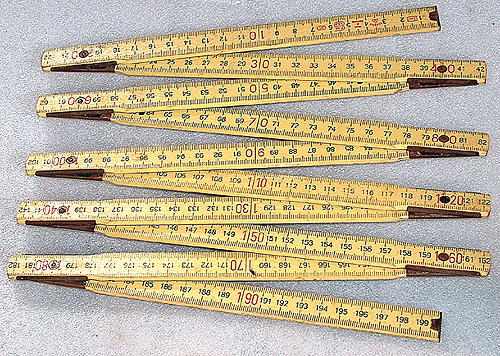
- A carpenter's ruler with centimetre divisions

General information
- Unit system: SI
- Unit of: length
- Symbol: cm

Conversions
1 cm in ...	... is equal to ...
- millimetres: 10 mm
- imperial & US system: ~0.3937 in

Different lengths as in respect to the electromagnetic spectrum, measured by the metre and its derived scales. The microwave is in-between 1 metre to 1 millimetre.

A centimetre (International spelling) or centimeter (American English), with SI symbol cm, is a unit of length in the International System of Units (SI) equal to one hundredth of a metre, centi- being the SI prefix for a factor of 1/100. Equivalently, there are 100 centimetres in 1 metre. The centimetre is the base unit of length in the now deprecated centimetre–gram–second (CGS) system of units.

Though for many physical quantities, SI prefixes for factors of 10^{3}—like milli- and kilo-—are often preferred by technicians, the centimetre remains a practical unit of length for many everyday measurements; for instance, human height is commonly measured in centimetres. A centimetre is approximately the width of the fingernail of an average adult person.

== Equivalence to other units of length ==
1 centimetre	= 10 millimetres
1 centimetre	= 0.01 metres
1 centimetre	= 0.3937 inches (There are exactly 2.54 centimetres in one inch.)
1 centimetre	= 0.0109 yards

One millilitre is defined as one cubic centimetre, under the SI system of units.

== Other uses ==
In addition to its use in the measurement of length, the centimetre is used:

- sometimes, to report the level of rainfall as measured by a rain gauge
- in the CGS system, the centimetre is used to measure capacitance, where 1 cm of capacitance = 1.113×10^{−12} farads
- in maps, centimetres are used to make conversions from map scale to real world scale (kilometres)
- to represent second moment of areas (cm^{4})
- as the inverse of the Kayser, a CGS unit, and thus a non-SI metric unit of wavenumber: 1 kayser = 1 wave per centimetre; or, more generally, (wavenumber in kaysers) = 1/(wavelength in centimetres). The SI unit of wavenumber is the inverse metre, m^{−1}.

== Unicode symbols ==
For the purposes of compatibility with Chinese, Japanese and Korean (CJK) characters, Unicode has symbols for:

- centimetre – U+339D ㎝ SQUARE CM
- square centimetre – U+33A0 ㎠ SQUARE CM SQUARED
- cubic centimetre – U+33A4 ㎤ SQUARE CM CUBED

These characters are each equal in size to one Chinese character and are typically used only with East Asian, fixed-width CJK fonts.

== See also ==
- Conversion of units
- Orders of magnitude (length)
- Reciprocal length
