= Guangzhan Expressway =

Expressway in Guangdong, China

Guangzhang Expressway (广湛高速) connects the cities Guangzhou and Zhanjiang in the Chinese province of Guangdong.

The expressway is made up of five different expressways that connects the cities between Guangzhou and Zhanjiang, the include:

- Guangfo Expressway (广佛高速) connects the cities Guangzhou and Foshan.
- Fokai Expressway (佛开高速) connects the cities Foshan and Kaiping.
- Kaiyang Expressway (开阳高速) connects the cities Kaiping and Yangjiang.
- Yangmao Expressway (阳茂高速) connects the cities Yanjing and Maoming.
- Maozhan Expressway (茂湛高速) connects the cities Maoming and Zhanjiang.
