= Nansha =

Nansha (南沙) may refer to the following places:

- Nansha, Guangzhou, in Guangdong, China
  - Nansha Subdistrict, in Nansha, Guangzhou, Guangdong, China
  - Nansha Metro Line, properly Line 4, Guangzhou Metro
  - S105 Nansha Port Expressway (南沙港快速路; Nánshāgǎng Kuàisùlù)
- Nansha, Sansha, in Hainan, China

Nansha may also refer to:

- Jiang Tingxi (1669–1732), Chinese painter who used Nansha as one of his pseudonyms
- Adenophora stricta, known in Chinese as "Nansha Ginseng"

== See also ==
- Jiuduansha or Jiangya Nansha, one of the shoals of Jiuduansha off Shanghai in the East China Sea
- Chongming Island#History for Nansha a former island in the Yangtze estuary now forming part of Chongming Island in Shanghai
- Nanshan Island, a member of the Spratlys administered by the Philippines as "Lawak"
- Saori Minami (Japanese: 南沙織)
