= G2531 Hangzhou–Shangrao Expressway =

Road in China

Hangzhou–Shangrao Expressway
- 杭州－上饶高速公路
- Hangshang Expressway 杭上高速公路

Route information
- Auxiliary route of G25

Major junctions
- West end: Shangrao, Jiangxi
- East end: Fuyang District, Hangzhou, Zhejiang

Location
- Country: China

Highway system
- National Trunk Highway System; Primary; Auxiliary; National Highways; Transport in China
← G2515	→ G2517

The G2531 Hangzhou–Shangrao Expressway (Chinese: 杭州—上饶高速公路), also referred to as the Hangshang Expressway (Chinese: 杭上高速公路), is an under construction expressway in China that will connect the cities of Hangzhou, Zhejiang and Shangrao, Jiangxi via Chun'an County and Kaihua County.
