= Qingshuipu Bridge =

Qingshuipu Bridge 清水浦大桥
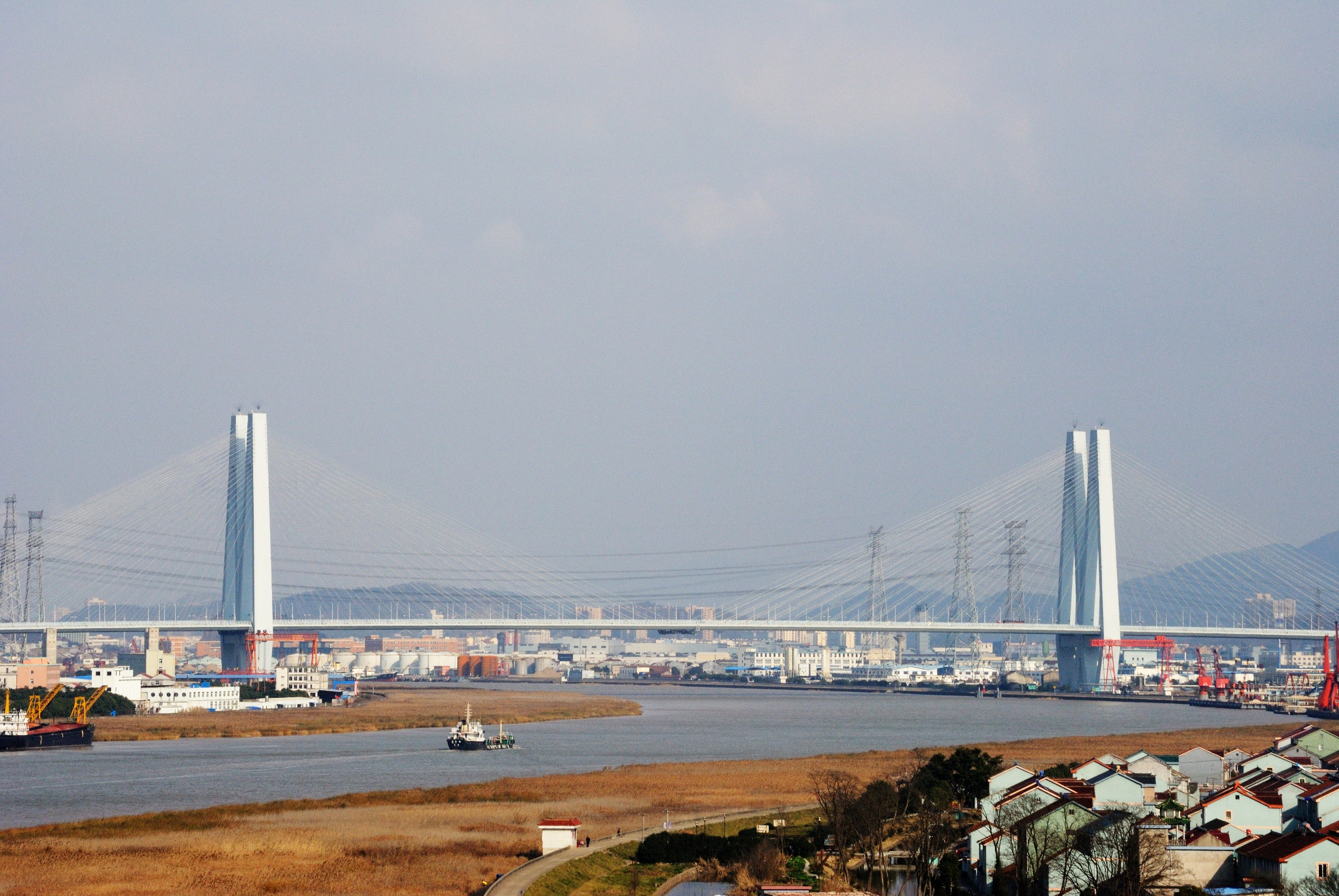
- Qingshuipu Bridge in January 2012
- Coordinates: 29.921695°N 121.683547°E
- Carries: G1504 Ningbo Ring Expressway
- Crosses: Yong River
- Locale: Ningbo, Zhejiang

Characteristics
- Design: Cable-stayed
- Total length: 858 metres (2,815 ft)
- Width: 56.7 metres (186 ft)
- Height: 146 metres (479 ft)
- Longest span: 468 metres (1,535 ft)

History
- Construction start: 8 November 2007
- Opened: 28 December 2011

Location
- Interactive map of Qingshuipu Bridge

Qingshuipu Bridge (Chinese: 清水浦大桥) is a cable-stayed bridge across the Yong River in Ningbo, Zhejiang, China which carries the G1504 Ningbo Ring Expressway. Construction started on 8 November 2007 and the bridge opened to traffic on 28 December 2011. When it was completed, it was the world's largest multi-tower split-frame cable-stayed bridge.

== See also ==
- List of longest cable-stayed bridge spans
- List of tallest bridges
