= Taoyaomen Bridge =

Taoyaomen Bridge 桃夭门大桥
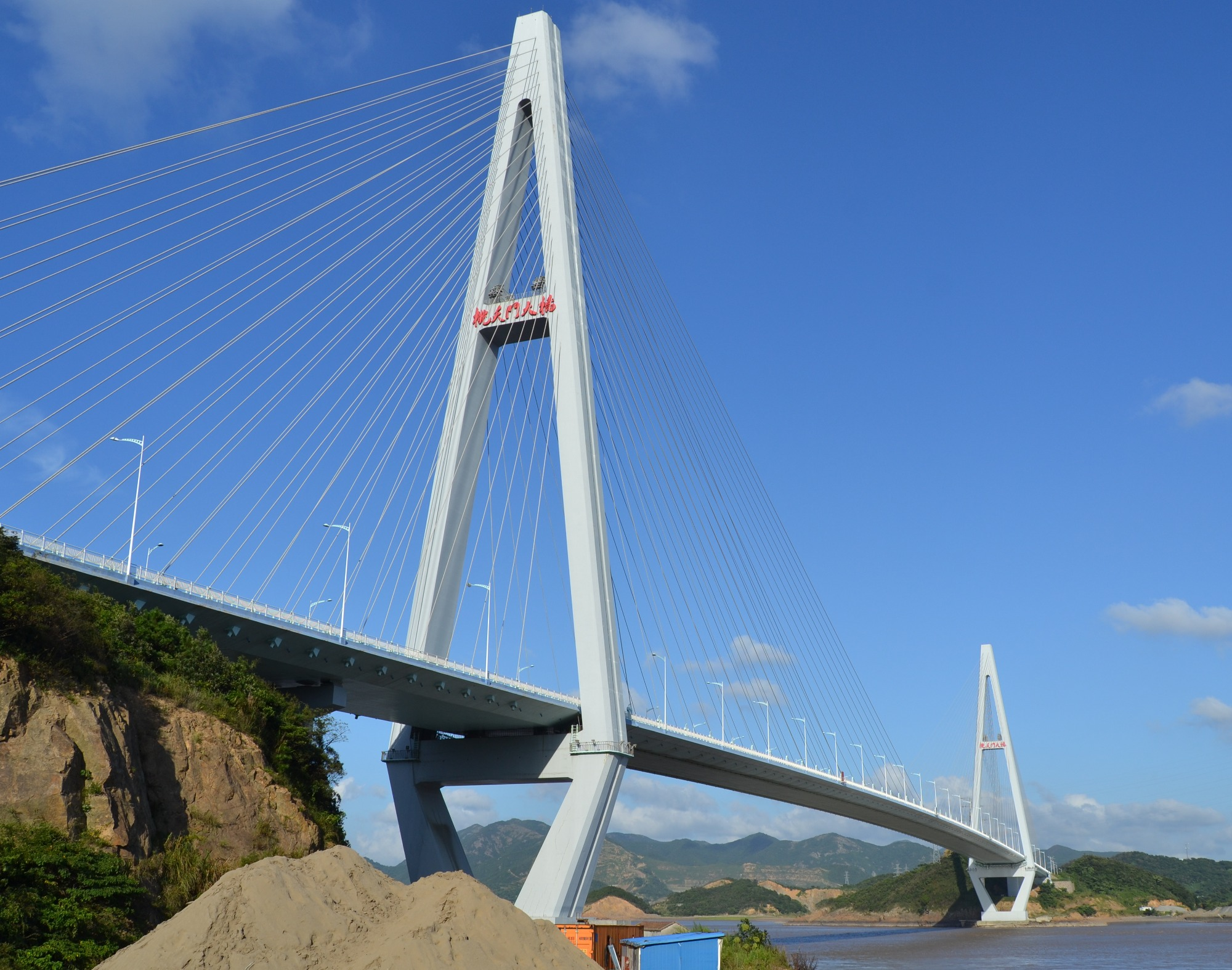
- Coordinates: 30°06′N 121°58′E
- Carries: Yongzhou Expressway
- Crosses: Taoyaomen Channel
- Locale: Between Fuchi Island and Cezi Island, Zhoushan, Zhejiang province, China

Characteristics
- Design: Cable-stayed
- Total length: 888 m
- Width: 27.6 m (91 ft)
- Height: 150.98 m (495 ft)
- Longest span: 580 m (1,903 ft)
- No. of spans: 7
- Load limit: 2000 t
- Clearance above: 32 m

History
- Construction start: March 2001
- Construction end: April 2003
- Opened: 2003

Statistics
- Daily traffic: 2 directions 4 lanes

Location
- Interactive map of Taoyaomen Bridge 桃夭门大桥

The Taoyaomen Bridge (Traditional Chinese: 桃夭門大橋, Simplified Chinese: 桃夭门大桥, Pinyin: táo yāo mén dà qiáo), is a cable-stayed bridge located in Zhoushan, Zhejiang Province of the PRC, that crosses the Taoyaomen Channel (Simplified Chinese: 桃夭门水道), linking Fuchi Island (Simplified Chinese: 富翅岛) and Cezi Island (Simplified Chinese: 册子岛). It is the third bridge of the Zhoushan Islands-Linking megaproject (see: Zhoushan Trans-oceanic Bridges).

Its seven spans are of 48 metres (157 ft) + 48 metres (157 ft) + 50 metres (160 ft) + 580 metres (1,900 ft) (main span) + 50 metres (160 ft) + 48 metres (157 ft) + 48 metres (157 ft).

== See also ==
- Xihoumen Bridge
- G9211 Ningbo–Zhoushan Expressway
- List of bridges in China
- List of longest cable-stayed bridge spans
- List of tallest bridges
