= Jintang Bridge =

Jintang Bridge 金塘大桥
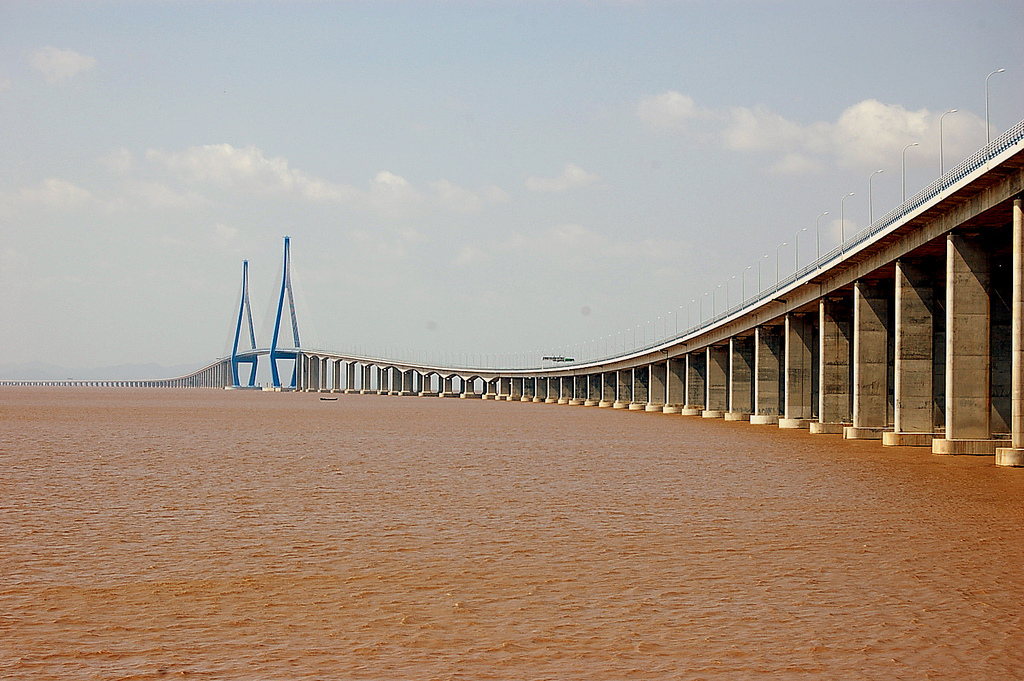
- Coordinates: 30°03′40″N 121°48′16″E
- Carries: Yongzhou Expressway
- Crosses: Huibieyang sea area
- Locale: Jintang Island, Zhoushan/Zhenhai, Ningbo, China

Characteristics
- Design: Cable-stayed bridge
- Total length: 26,540 m (16 mi)
- Height: 202.5 m (664 ft)
- Longest span: 620 m (2,034 ft)

History
- Opened: December 25, 2009

Statistics
- Toll: Yes

Location
- Interactive map of Jintang Bridge

Jintang Bridge (Chinese: 金塘大桥; pinyin: Jīntáng dàqiáo; Wu: Jin-dohn du-jiau) is a highway bridge with a cable-stayed bridge portion, built in Zhejiang, China on the Zhoushan Archipelago, the largest offshore island group in China. It is the longest bridge in Zhoushan Trans-oceanic Bridges with a length of 26,540 metres (87,070 ft), connecting Jintang Island and Zhenhai, Ningbo. The main navigation part is a cable-stayed bridge with a 620 metres (2,030 ft) span.

== See also ==
- Zhoushan Trans-oceanic Bridges
- Xihoumen Bridge
- List of bridges in China
- List of longest cable-stayed bridge spans
- List of tallest bridges
