= G1505 Fuzhou Ring Expressway =

Road in Fuzhou, China

Fuzhou Ring Expressway
- 福州绕城高速公路
- 福州四环路

Route information
- Length: 160 km (99 mi)
- Existed: 2004–present

Location
- Country: China

Highway system
- National Trunk Highway System; Primary; Auxiliary; National Highways; Transport in China
← G1504	→ G1508

The Fuzhou Ring Expressway (Chinese: 福州绕城高速公路), designated as G1505 and also referred to as the Fuzhou Fourth Ring Road (Chinese: 福州四环路), is ring expressway in Fuzhou, Fujian, China.

== History ==
The first section of the Fuzhou Ring Expressway was opened to traffic on 28 December 2004. The northwest section was opened in several phases from 1 October 2010 to 5 March 2012. The southeast section was opened to traffic on 29 September 2019 thus completing the Fuzhou Ring Expressway.
