= G2517 Shaxian–Xiamen Expressway =

Expressway in Fujian, China

Shaxian–Xiamen Expressway
- 沙县－厦门高速公路
- Shaxian Expressway 沙厦高速公路

Route information
- Auxiliary route of G25
- Length: 241 km (150 mi)

Major junctions
- North end: G25 / G70 in Shaxian District, Sanming, Fujian
- South end: G15 in Jimei District, Xiamen, Fujian

Location
- Country: China

Highway system
- National Trunk Highway System; Primary; Auxiliary; National Highways; Transport in China
← G2516	→ G2518

The G2517 Shaxian–Xiamen Expressway (Chinese: 沙县—厦门高速公路), commonly referred to as the Shaxian Expressway (Chinese: 沙厦高速公路), is an expressway that connects the cities of Sanming and Xiamen in Fujian, China.

== History ==
Construction of the expressway began in December 2010 with the first section opening in 2011 with the S30 route marker. Tolls were first introduced on certain sections of the expressway on 30 August 2013. The final section was opened to traffic on 12 December 2017.
