= Kilometre per square kilometre =

Kilometre per square kilometre is an SI derived unit of reciprocal length used for measurement of density of a linear feature in an area. It is used to measure, for example, drainage density or road density (i.e. kilometres of road per square kilometre of land).

== Transport density in the European Union ==
In the European Union, kilometre per square kilometre is the unit of measure of transport network density.

=== Motorway density ===
According to Europa.eu,

Despite having only a small motorway network (91 km), the island of Malta reported the highest motorway network density among all regions of the EU.

Usually, the densest motorway networks are found around capital cities and other big cities, in large industrial conurbations and around major seaports.

The regions with the higher motorway density are:

- the German city-state regions of Bremen, Hamburg and Berlin (186 km, 107 km and 86 km per thousand km²)
- Düsseldorf (121 km per thousand km²)
- Saarland (93 km per thousand km²).
- the north-western part of England (138 km per thousand km² in Greater Manchester)
- the West Midlands of England (90 km per thousand km²);
- the Randstad region in the west of the Netherlands (where densities reached 129 km, 128 km and 106 km per thousand km² in South Holland, Utrecht and North Holland respectively)
- the southern Dutch regions of Limburg and North Brabant (100 km and 99 km per thousand km² respectively).

Many cities are rounded by a motorway ring, so the density metric is dependent on the size of the city:

- Lisbon (222 km per thousand km², in 2004),
- Vienna (109 km per thousand km²)
- Comunidad de Madrid (98 km per thousand km²)

=== Rail density ===
EU-15 had 48.3 km of railways per 1,000 square kilometres in 2000), more than in the United States (30.6 km/1000 km² in 1999, including Alaska and Hawaii and inland waters) but less than in Japan (53.5 km/1000 km² in 1999).

For rail networks, in Europe, the highest network density can be found in the Czech Republic, Belgium, Luxembourg and Germany (above 100 km/1000 km²), followed by the Netherlands, Hungary, Austria, Slovakia, the United Kingdom and Poland (65–86 km/1000 km²). At the lower end of the range are Turkey, Norway, Finland and Greece, with values of 20 km/1000 km² and below.
