= G6011 Nanchang–Shaoguan Expressway =

Expressway in Jiangxi and Guangdong Provinces of China

Nanchang–Shaoguan Expressway
- 南昌-韶关高速公路
- Nanshao Expressway 南韶高速

Route information
- Auxiliary route of G60
- Length: 125.3 km (77.9 mi)
- Existed: 31 December 2010–present

Major junctions
- North end: Nanchang, Jiangxi
- South end: Shaoguan, Guangdong

Location
- Country: China

Highway system
- National Trunk Highway System; Primary; Auxiliary; National Highways; Transport in China
← G6002	→ G6012

G6011 Nanchang-Shaoguan Expressway (Chinese: 南韶高速公路) is an expressway that is linked between the G4 Beijing–Hong Kong and Macau Expressway and the G45 Daqing–Guangzhou Expressway as well as East China into Guangdong and Pearl River Delta. One of the most convenient corridors, and it is also the second highway connecting Guangdong with Jiangxi after Yuegan Expressway.
