= S105 Nansha Port Expressway =

Road in Guangdong, China

S105 Expressway
- 南沙港快速路

Route information
- Length: 65.7 km (40.8 mi)

Major junctions
- North end: Keyun Road in Haizhu
- Guangdong S81 in Haizhu; Guangdong S39 in Nansha; G4W in Nansha
- South end: Haigang Avenue in Nansha

Location
- Country: China
- Province: Guangdong

Highway system
- Transport in China; Expressways of Guangdong

The Nansha Port Expressway (Chinese: 南沙港快速路; pinyin: Nánshā gǎng kuàisù lù) is a truck transportation route in Guangzhou connecting Nansha District to other areas within the Pearl River Delta region. It is 72 km in length and cost ¥6.509 billion RMB.

== Geography ==
The Nansha Port Expressway starts from Longxue Island to Guangzhou Nansha District. The expressway is also in the vicinity of major roads such as Humen highways to Dongguan, Beijing-Zhuhai East Line and other expressways.

== Economy ==
The expressway is a critical transport route which serves Port of Guangzhou's Nansha port, Nansha development zone and the metropolitan industrial areas of Guangzhou and to Dongguan.

== Exit list ==
The entire route is in Guangzhou.

Location	km	mi	Exit	Name	Destinations	Notes
Haizhu	0.0	0	1A	Luntou	Keyun Road – Tianhe District, Biology Island, Pazhou Conference Center	
Haizhu	0.35	0.22	1B	Guangdong S81 – Fangcun, Huangpu		
Panyu	4.5	2.8	4	Higher Education; Mega Centre	Guangzhou Higher Education Mega Centre, Tower Camps of Huangpu Military Academy	
Panyu	11.1	6.9	11	Qixinggang	Jinshan Avenue, Panyu Avenue – Guangzhou South Railway Station, Nancun	
Panyu	17.9	11.1	18	Asian Games	X302 (Asian Games Avenue) – Asian Games Town, Shiqiao, Shiqi, Lianhua Hill	
Nansha	22.9	14.2	22	Shinan Road	Guangdong S257 (Shinan Road) – Dongchong, Datong	Southbound exit and northbound entrance
Nansha	26.5	16.5	26	Yuwotou	Nansha Avenue – Yuwotou	Southbound exit and northbound entrance
Nansha	29.9	18.6	29	Xili	Guangdong S302 east – Shenzhen, Humen, Huangge, Nansha	
Nansha	35.6	22.1	35	Miaobeisha	Guangdong S111 – Dagang, Tingjiao	
Nansha	39.3	24.4	39	Xinlian	Guangdong S39 – Shunde, Foshan, Panyu, Fangcun, Guangzhou South Railway Station	
Nansha	42.1	26.2	41	Hengli Interchange	G4W – Zhongshan, Zhuhai, Dongguan, Shenzhen	
Nansha	47.3	29.4	46	Sushiqing	Guangdong S111 – Hongqili Bridge, Wanqingsha, Zhongshan Port	
Nansha	50.8	31.6	50	Fu'an	X298 – Zhujiang Management, Fu'an, Liuchong	Southbound exit and northbound entrance
Nansha	54.4	33.8	53	Lixinsha	X298 – Lixinsha, Wanqingsha	Southbound exit and northbound entrance
Nansha	61.8	38.4	62B	Xinlong	Gangtiejidi, Shiliuchong	
Nansha	62.6	38.9		Xinlong Toll Gate		
Nansha	65.7	40.8	62A	Xinlong	Nansha Port Area	
Closed/former; Concurrency terminus; HOV only; Incomplete access; Tolled; Route transition; Unopened
