= Guangfo Expressway =

Road in Guangdong, China

Coordinates: 23.1385°N 113.1620°E

Guangfo Expressway
- 广佛高速公路

Route information
- Length: 15.7 km (9.8 mi)

Location
- Country: China
- Province: Guangdong

Highway system
- Transport in China; Expressways of Guangdong

Guangfo Expressway (simplified Chinese: 广佛高速公路; traditional Chinese: 廣佛高速公路; pinyin: Guǎngfó Gāosùgōnglù) connects the cities of Guangzhou and Foshan in the Guangdong province, China.
