= Cenxi =

Cenxi 岑溪市 · Cinzhih Si Shumkai
- County-level city
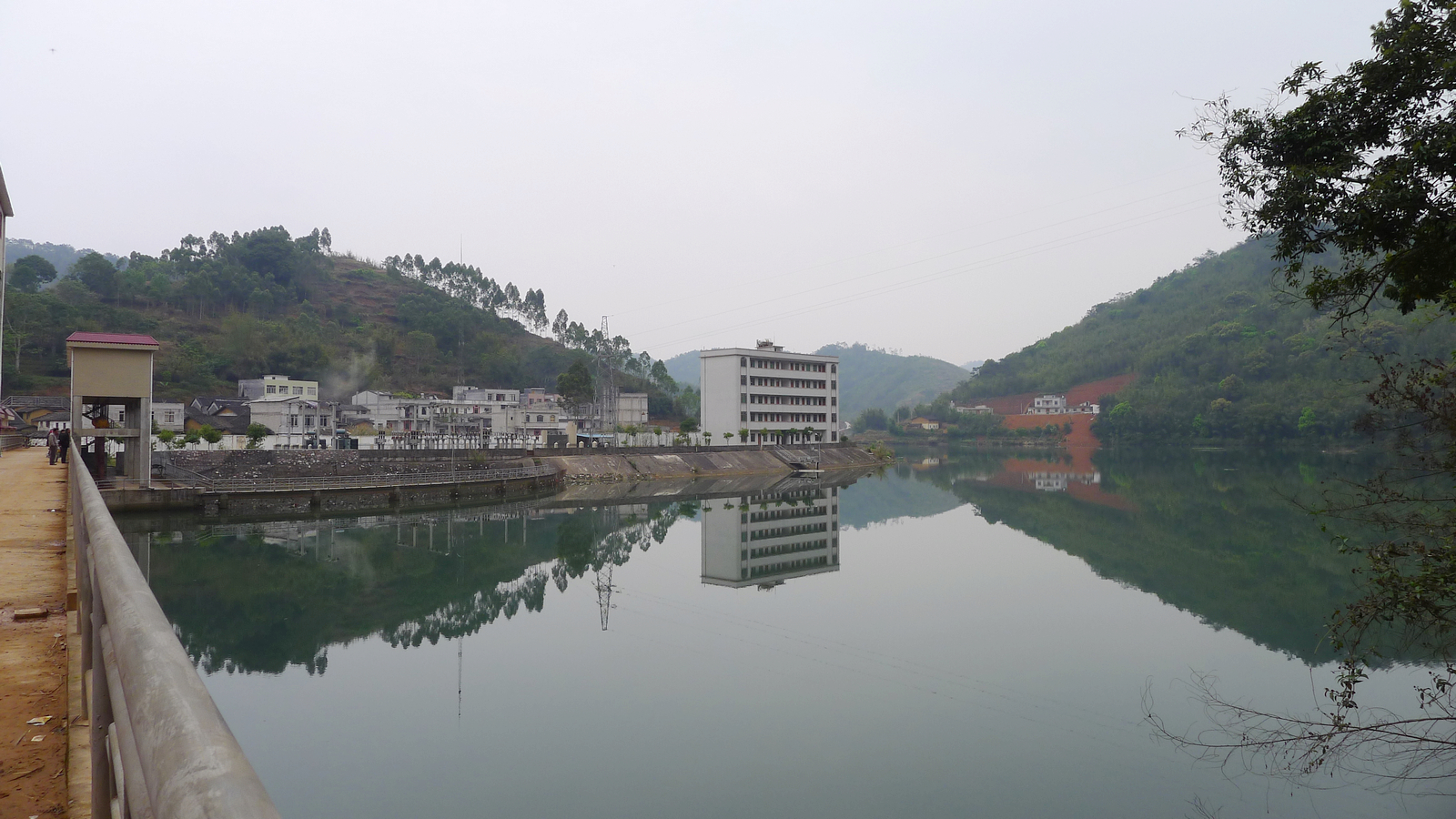
- Interactive map of Cenxi
- Coordinates: 22°55′N 111°00′E
- Country: China
- Autonomous region: Guangxi
- Prefecture-level city: Wuzhou
- Township-level divisions: 14 towns
- Municipal seat: Cencheng (岑城镇)

Area
  - Total: 2,783 km^{2} (1,075 sq mi)
- Elevation: 107 m (351 ft)

Population (2006)
  - Total: 840,000
  - Density: 300/km^{2} (780/sq mi)
- Time zone: UTC+8 (China Standard)
- Postal code: 543200
- Area code: 0774

Cenxi (Chinese: 岑溪; pinyin: Cénxī; Jyutping: sam^{4}kai^{1}) is a county-level city under the administration of Wuzhou City, in the east of Guangxi, China.

== History ==
The first state that governed the current area of Cenxi was the Nanyue Kingdom, which was succeeded by the Han dynasty, which established Mengling County (猛陵縣) in the current area of Cenxi.

During the Southern dynasties in A.D. 524, Yongye Commandery (永業縣) was established on current area of Cenxi, whereas during the Sui dynasty in A.D. 583, its administrative level was changed to County.

Later in the Tang dynasty in A.D. 622, it was restructured to Nanyi Zhou (南義州), which was subdivided into 3 counties: Anyi (安義), Longcheng (龍城) and Yicheng (義城). In A.D. 757, Longcheng County was renamed to Cenxi County, which became the precursor of current name.

During the Northern Song dynasty in A.D. 973, the aforementioned 3 counties were reintegrated into Cenxi County, and then this name was retained during subsequent dynasties and states.

== Geography ==
Cenxi borders with Guangdong province and its downtown is 32 kilometres west of the boundary. It situates on Lingnan hügelland, featured with mostly mountains, and its climate is characterised as humid subtropical. The municipality comprises a downtown core, several rural town hubs, and hundreds of rural villages. Agricultural fields and forests account for most of the landmasses. The region contains massive and diverse natural occurrence of granite resources.

== Administrative divisions ==
Cenxi administers 14 towns:

Towns:

- Cencheng (岑城镇), Malu (马路镇), Nandu (南渡镇), Shuiwen (水汶镇), Dalong (大隆镇), Limu (黎木镇), Daye (大业镇), Jinzhu (筋竹镇), Chengjian (城谏镇), Guiyi (归义镇), Nuodong (糯垌镇), Anping (安平镇), Sanbao (三堡镇), Botang (波塘镇)

== Demographics ==
The total population at the point of 2006 was approximately 0.78 million, of which ethnic Han people account for 99.6% of the total population. By the records of household registration, 15.8% of the population are non-agricultural, and 84.2% are agricultural.

== Language ==
Cenxi situates close to the westernmost edge of Cantonese-speaking area, and the great majority of local population speak a vernacular that is classified under the Goulou dialect (勾漏片), a Cantonese variety that is moderately related to standard Cantonese (i.e. Guangzhou dialect) in terms of vocabulary, grammar and phonetics, and remains largely mutually intelligible with most of the Cantonese varieties. Unlike other Cantonese-speaking major cities (e.g. Guangzhou and Nanning), Cenxi dialect continues to be the mother tongue of the majority of local residents and widely spoken on a daily basis, thanks to its low immigration and relatively isolated geography. Mandarin is the medium of instruction at schools, but only used when communicating with non-Cantonese aliens.

== Notable people ==
- Liang Fangwu (梁方伍/梁天桂/梁天柱). Kungfu master in Faat Ga Family of martial arts.
- Chen Jihuan (陈济桓). Military general in Second Sino-Japanese War, died in Battle of Guilin–Liuzhou.

== Climate ==
Climate data for Cenxi, elevation 99 m (325 ft), (1991–2020 normals, extremes 1981–present)
Month	Jan	Feb	Mar	Apr	May	Jun	Jul	Aug	Sep	Oct	Nov	Dec	Year
Record high °C (°F)	29.8 (85.6)	34.8 (94.6)	34.8 (94.6)	35.6 (96.1)	36.3 (97.3)	38.2 (100.8)	38.9 (102.0)	38.6 (101.5)	38.0 (100.4)	36.3 (97.3)	33.6 (92.5)	30.6 (87.1)	38.9 (102.0)
Mean daily maximum °C (°F)	18.0 (64.4)	20.3 (68.5)	22.8 (73.0)	27.8 (82.0)	31.0 (87.8)	32.7 (90.9)	33.9 (93.0)	33.7 (92.7)	32.0 (89.6)	29.5 (85.1)	25.5 (77.9)	20.8 (69.4)	27.3 (81.2)
Daily mean °C (°F)	12.9 (55.2)	15.3 (59.5)	18.3 (64.9)	23.1 (73.6)	26.1 (79.0)	27.7 (81.9)	28.5 (83.3)	28.2 (82.8)	26.5 (79.7)	23.5 (74.3)	19.0 (66.2)	14.6 (58.3)	22.0 (71.6)
Mean daily minimum °C (°F)	9.6 (49.3)	12.1 (53.8)	15.2 (59.4)	19.9 (67.8)	22.8 (73.0)	24.6 (76.3)	25.1 (77.2)	24.9 (76.8)	23.1 (73.6)	19.4 (66.9)	14.8 (58.6)	10.6 (51.1)	18.5 (65.3)
Record low °C (°F)	−0.8 (30.6)	1.9 (35.4)	1.8 (35.2)	8.4 (47.1)	12.7 (54.9)	16.4 (61.5)	19.8 (67.6)	21.0 (69.8)	14.6 (58.3)	6.1 (43.0)	2.2 (36.0)	−1.7 (28.9)	−1.7 (28.9)
Average precipitation mm (inches)	51.1 (2.01)	45.7 (1.80)	75.0 (2.95)	158.8 (6.25)	232.5 (9.15)	228.9 (9.01)	197.5 (7.78)	212.8 (8.38)	133.7 (5.26)	58.1 (2.29)	50.3 (1.98)	39.8 (1.57)	1,484.2 (58.43)
Average precipitation days (≥ 0.1 mm)	9.8	10.5	13.4	15.0	17.0	19.5	16.8	17.1	11.7	5.3	6.0	6.7	148.8
Average relative humidity (%)	77	79	80	79	79	81	78	80	79	75	74	74	78
Mean monthly sunshine hours	94.2	85.1	73.1	104.5	149.4	158.3	208.8	196.7	170.9	191.6	165.5	139.7	1,737.8
Percentage possible sunshine	28	26	20	27	36	39	51	49	47	54	50	42	39
Source: China Meteorological Administrationall-time October record
