= Xihoumen Bridge =

Xihoumen Bridge 西堠门大桥
- Coordinates: 30°03′42″N 121°54′55″E
- Carries: Yongzhou Expressway
- Crosses: Xihoumen Strait; Hangzhou Bay
- Locale: Jintang Island and Cezi Island, Zhejiang province, China

Characteristics
- Design: Suspension bridge
- Height: 211.3 m (693 ft)
- Longest span: 1,650 m (5,413 ft)

History
- Construction end: 16 December 2007
- Opened: 25 December 2009

Location
- Interactive map of Xihoumen Bridge

The Xihoumen Bridge (Chinese: 西堠门大桥) is a suspension bridge on the Zhoushan Archipelago, the largest offshore island group in China.

Linking Jintang and Cezi islands, the bridge, together with the 27-kilometre (17 mi) cable-stayed Jintang Bridge linking Jintang and Zhenhai in the neighboring city of Ningbo, is part of the second and last phase of a bridging project started in 1999 to connect the Zhoushan Archipelago to the mainland via five bridges. The bridge forms part of the Yongzhou Expressway.

Built by the province of Zhejiang at a cost of 2.48 billion yuan (approximately US$363 million), construction began in 2005 and the main span was completed in December 2007. The bridge was opened to traffic on a test basis on 25 December 2009, at 11:58 p.m., local time alongside the Jintang Bridge, before it is officially open for traffic. The opening date was delayed due to a ship collision on 16 November 2009 that slightly damaged the side of Jintang Bridge.

The 5.3 kilometres (3.3 mi) suspension bridge connection has a 2.6 kilometres (1.6 mi) main bridge with a central span of 1,650 metres (5,410 ft). The approaches total 2.7 kilometres (1.7 mi). When built, it was the second-longest suspension bridge ranked by the length of the centre span after the Akashi Kaikyō Bridge in Japan.

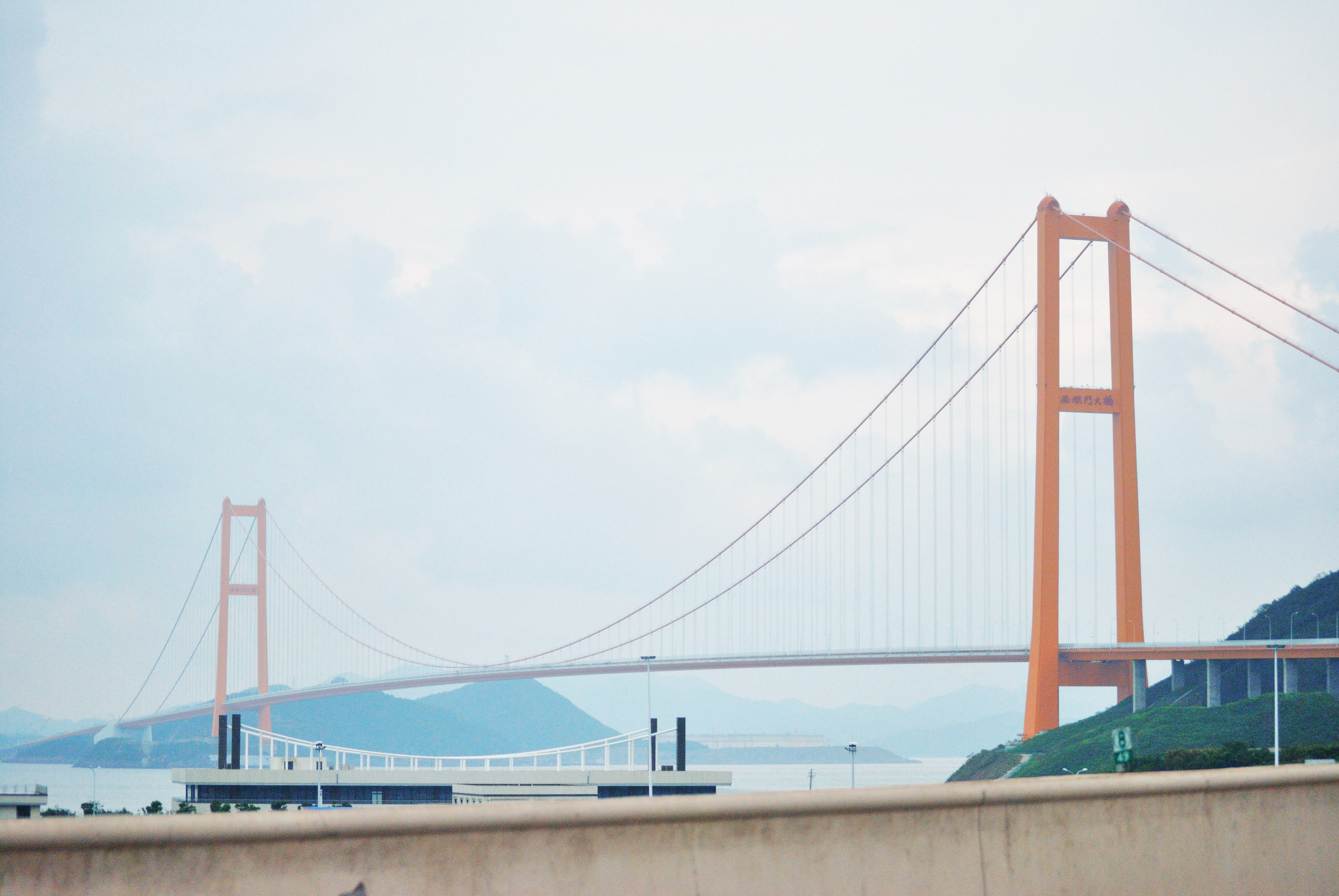

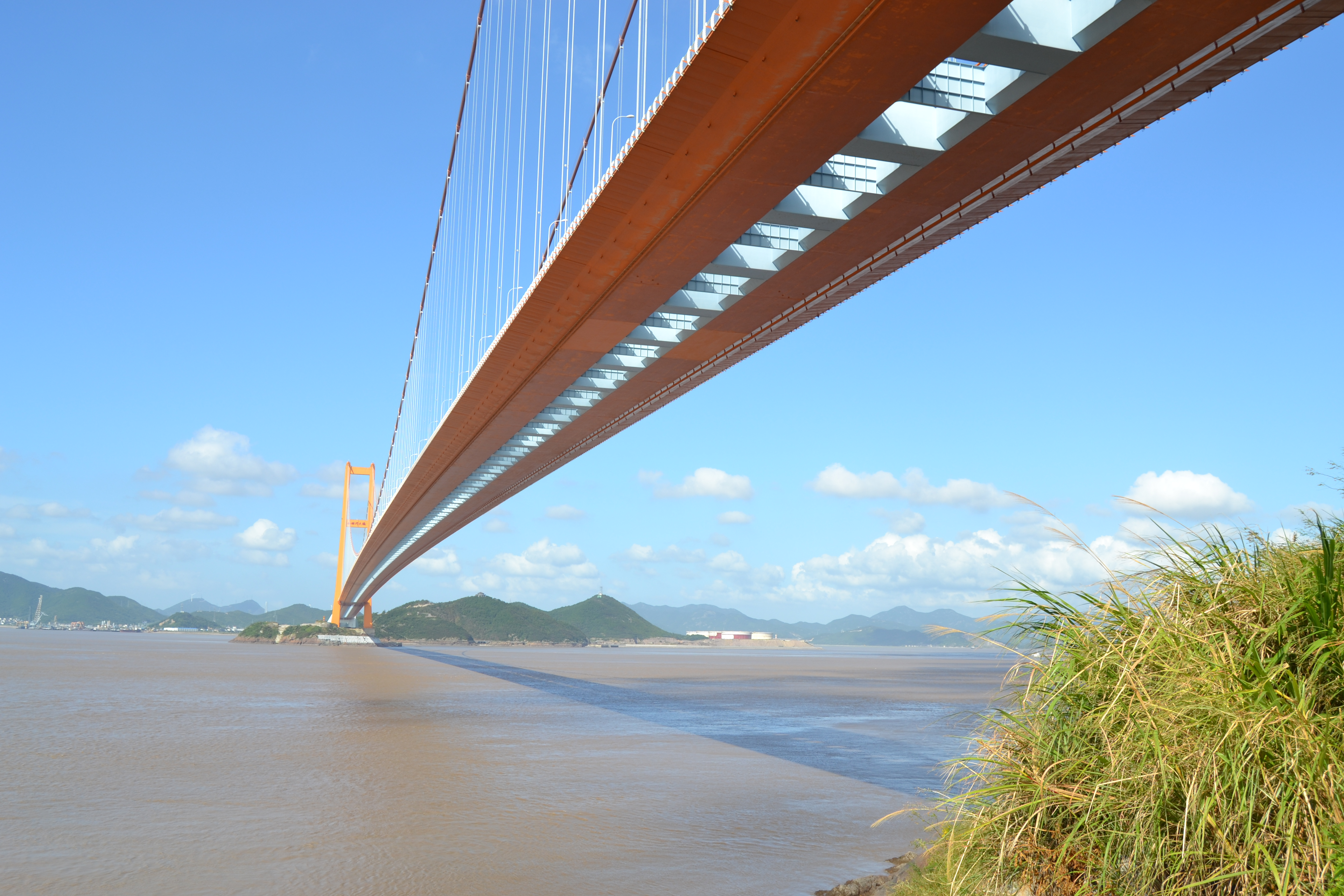

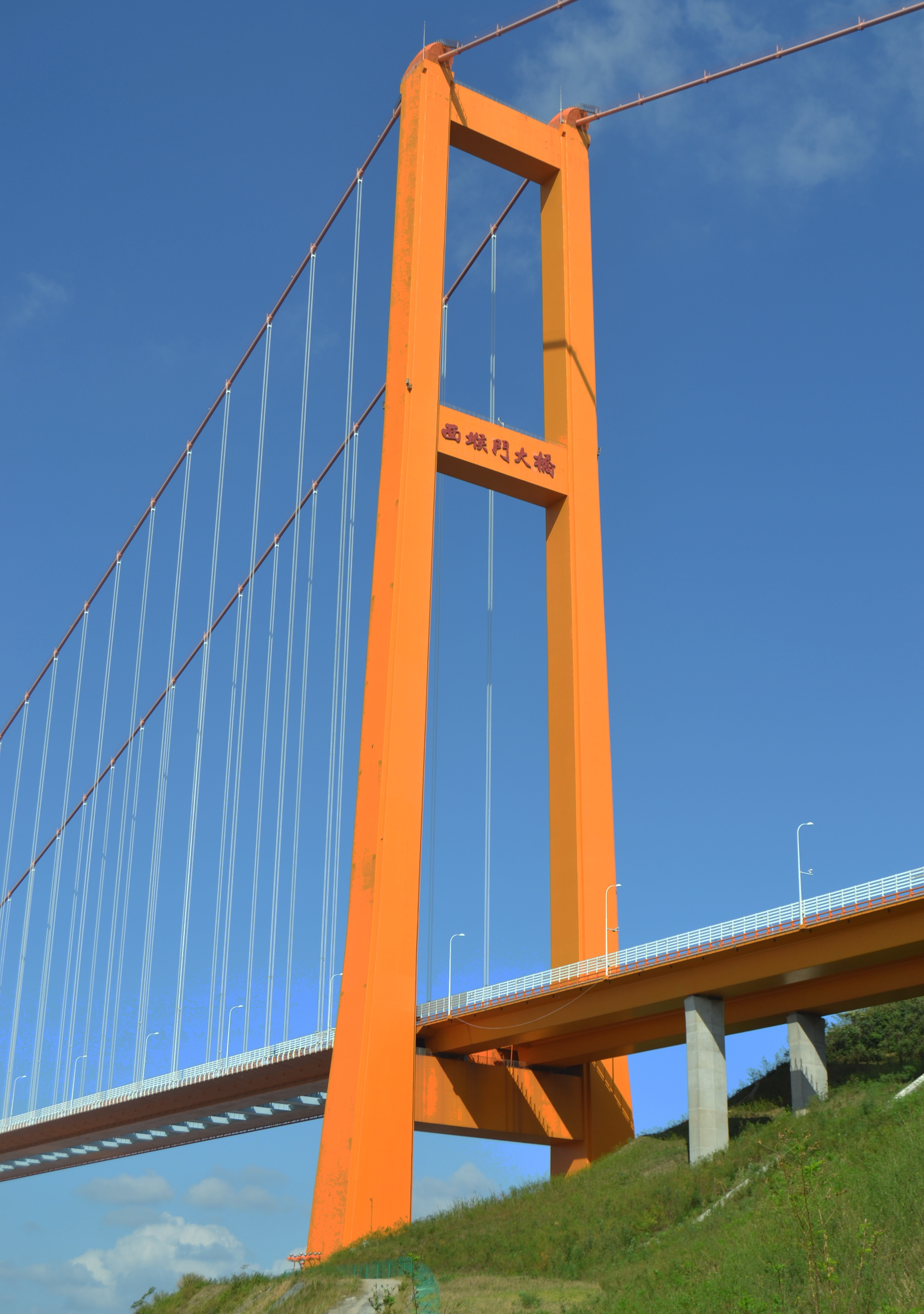

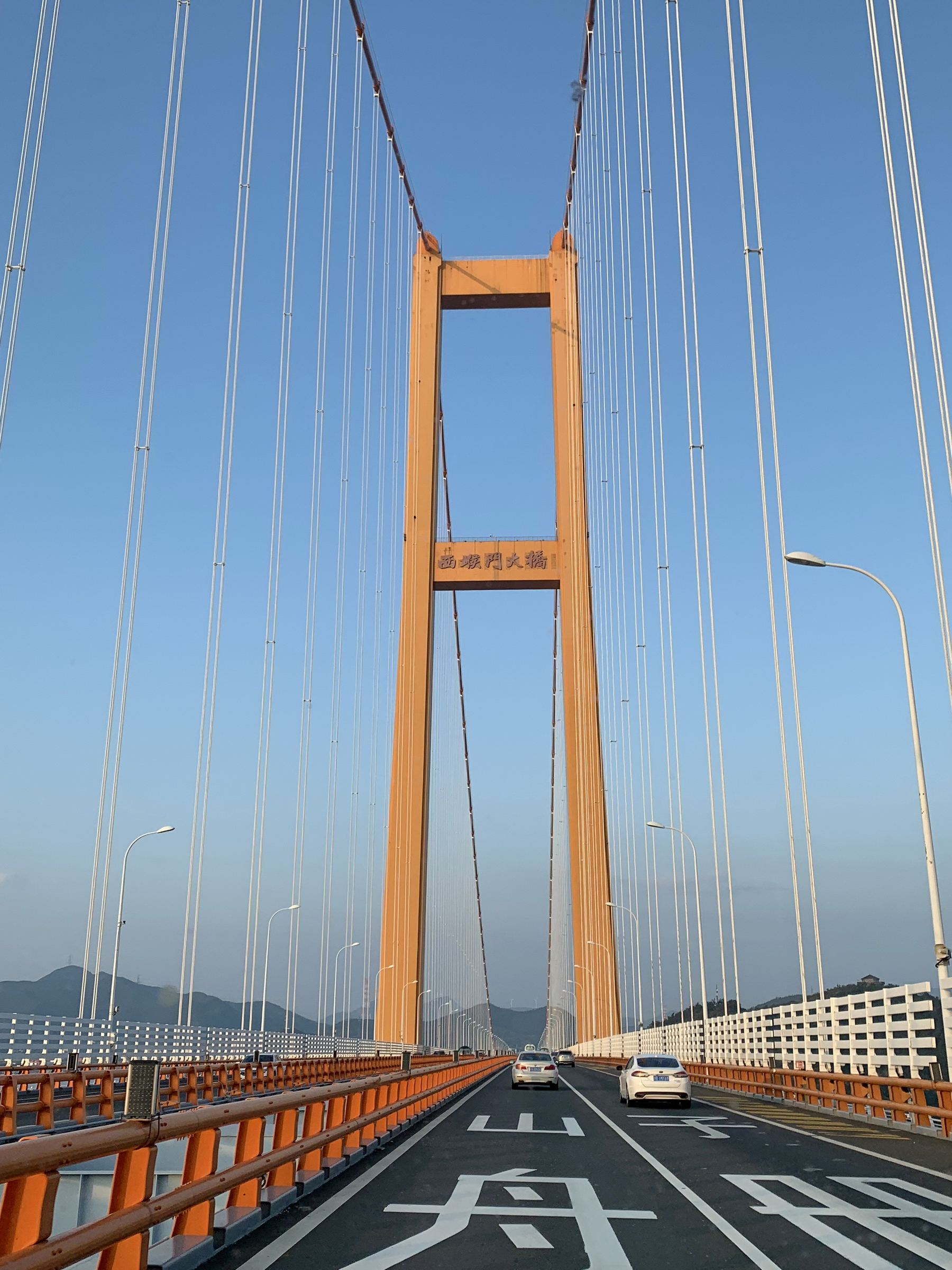

== See also ==
- Taoyaomen Bridge
- List of bridges in China
- List of longest suspension bridge spans
- List of tallest bridges
