= Jintang Island =

Island in China

Jintang
Native name: 金塘岛 Nickname: Golden Pond
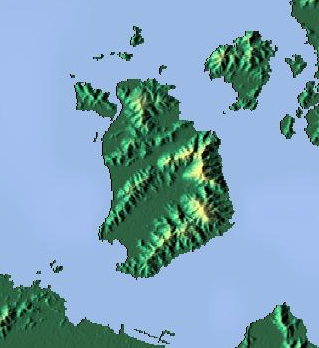
- Relief map of Jintang island

Geography
- Location: Zhoushan
- Coordinates: 30°N 121.9°E
- Archipelago: Zhoushan
- Total islands: 1,390 (103 inhabited)
- Area: 76.4 km^{2} (29.5 sq mi)

Administration
- People's Republic of China
- Province: Zhejiang
- Prefecture: Zhoushan

Demographics
- Population: 41700 (2003)
- Pop. density: 546/km^{2} (1414/sq mi)

Jintang Island (金塘岛) is an island in the Zhoushan prefecture-level city in China's eastern Zhejiang province. It has a population of about 41700.

It is one of the closest islands to the continental shore of Zhejiang, being only 3.6 kilometres (2.2 miles) from the southern Ningbo Beilun port and 6.25 kilometres (3.88 miles) from the eastern Zhoushan Island. Jintang is Zhoushan's fourth largest island with an area of 76.4 km^{2} (29.5 sq mi).

== History ==
The name Jintang Island is literally translated as "Golden Pond Island".

It derived its name from the two ponds built on the western side of the island by the locals to prevent erosion of the western coastline. The soil of the inner pond coastline became fertile and rich in minerals, bringing about bountiful harvests to the locals who dub the island "Golden Pond" (金塘).

== Industries ==
Jintang Island is largely an agricultural community. Its thriving industries include farming, fishing and furniture production.

It is most famous for the production of Jintang Plums (金塘李), a local fruit. The fruit has received a number of awards and accolades, earning a Zhejiang Province High Quality Agricultural Product Exhibition Silver Award in 1998 and subsequently a Gold Award in 1999 when the island was also conferred the namesake of "Jintang Plum Township (金塘李之乡)" by the provincial government.

Jintang Island coastal waters produce a large number of marine products, such as squid, cuttlefish, fish, and more.

== Transportation ==
Transport between Jintang and Zhoushan can be made by boat or bridge.

In April 2006 work began for the construction of two bridges, the Xihoumen Bridge (西堠门大桥) and Jintang Bridge (金塘大桥) connecting Zhoushan Archipelago with the country's continental area, an improvement long-awaited by Zhoushan people. They were completed and opened December 25, 2009.

The two bridges are the second phase of a huge "continent-island joint project" launched by Zhoushan in 1999 to link the archipelago with the mainland through five bridges. Construction of the other three bridges have also been completed.

=== Xihoumen Bridge ===
The 5.3-kilometer-long Xihoumen Bridge, linking Jintang and Cezi, two major islands of the archipelago, is a suspension bridge consisting of a 2.6-kilometer sea-crossing bridge and 2.7-kilometer side joint sections on both ends, costing 2.48 billion yuan (US$299.87 million). It allows the passage of ships of 30,000 dead weight tonnage.

=== Jintang Bridge ===
The Jintang Bridge, linking Jintang Island and Zhenhai (on Ningbo prefecture), will be 27 kilometres (17 miles) long. The 7-billion-yuan project consists of an 18.5-kilometre (11.5-mile) sea bridge and joint sections totaling 8.5 kilometres (5.3 miles).

On 27 March 2008, there has been an accident involving a Taizhou freighter that hit the bridge construction site. Two pieces of reinforced concrete from the bridge weighing 3000 tons each got stuck in the cockpit of the freighter, which was moving at a fast pace. The accident will result in further delay to the completion of its construction.

There are plans by a Sino-Italian consortium to build an archimedes bridge in the 3,300-metre (10,800-foot) Jintang strait.

Ningbo Ports Group is also planning to build a proposed 12 container berths worth 10 billion yuan (US$1.25billion) in future at Jintang Island in anticipation of fierce competition from Shanghai's Yangshan Deep-Water Port.
