= G1504 Ningbo Ring Expressway =

Road in Ningbo, China

Ningbo Ring Expressway
- 宁波绕城高速公路
- 宁波绕城高速

Route information
- Length: 85.63 km (53.21 mi)
- Existed: 2007–present

Location
- Country: China

Highway system
- National Trunk Highway System; Primary; Auxiliary; National Highways; Transport in China
← G1503	→ G1505

The Ningbo Ring Expressway (Chinese: 宁波绕城高速公路), designated as G1504, is ring expressway in Ningbo, Zhejiang, China. The Ningbo Ring Expressway is composed of east and west sections, with a total length of 85.63 kilometers and features 17 interchanges, 13 toll stations and 1 service area. The whole expressway was opened to traffic on 28 December 2011. It is known as the "golden ring line" of Ningbo.

== Overview ==
=== West section ===
The west section of Ningbo Ring Expressway starts from Luotuo Street, Yanjiaqiao Village, Zhenhai District, and ends at Jiangshan Town, Yinzhou District, passing through Haishu District and Fenghua District, with a total length of 42.135 kilometers. It opened to traffic on 26 December 2007

=== East section ===
The eastern section of Ningbo Ring Expressway starts from Jiangshan Town, Yinzhou District, passes through Beilun District, and ends at Luotuo Street, Yanjiaqiao Village, Zhenhai District connected to the west section. Among them, the section from Baoguo Temple to Linjiang was opened to traffic ahead of schedule on 31 December 2010 while the rest of the east section opened to traffic on 28 December 2011 after the completion of the Qingshuipu Bridge.
