= G1508 Guangzhou Ring Expressway =

Ring expressway in Guangzhou and Foshan of Guangdong, China

Guangzhou Ring Expressway
- 广州绕城高速公路
- 广州绕城高速

Route information
- Length: 195 km (121 mi)
- Existed: 2001–present

Location
- Country: China

Highway system
- National Trunk Highway System; Primary; Auxiliary; National Highways; Transport in China
← G1505	→ G1511

The Guangzhou Ring Expressway (Chinese: 广州绕城高速公路), designated as G1508, is a ring expressway that surrounds the cities of Guangzhou and Foshan in Guangdong, China. An important part of the trunk line of the national expressway between Hong Kong and Macao and the G15 Shenyang-Haikou Expressway, it is composed of Guangzhou North Second Ring Expressway, Guangzhou West Second Ring Expressway, Guangzhou East Second Ring Expressway and Guangzhou South Second Ring Expressway, with a total length of 195 kilometers.

== History ==
The early planning of the Guangzhou Ring Expressway began in 1995. The third meeting of the Pearl River Delta Economic Zone Planning and Coordination Leading Group held in Guangzhou decided to build the Guangzhou Second Ring Expressway, along with the local city trunk roads, transit roads and urban trunk roads. Construction of the northern section began on 26 April 1999, and was opened to traffic on 26 October 2001. The eastern section began construction on 7 November 2003 and was completed on 16 December 2008 with the opening of the Huangpu Bridge across the Pearl River. The western section began construction in December 2004 and was opened 24 December 2007. The last remaining section was the southern section which was opened on 31 December 2010.
