= G9411 Dongguan–Foshan Expressway =

Expressway in Guangdong, China

Dongguan–Foshan Expressway
- 东莞－佛山高速公路
- Guanfo Expressway 莞佛高速公路

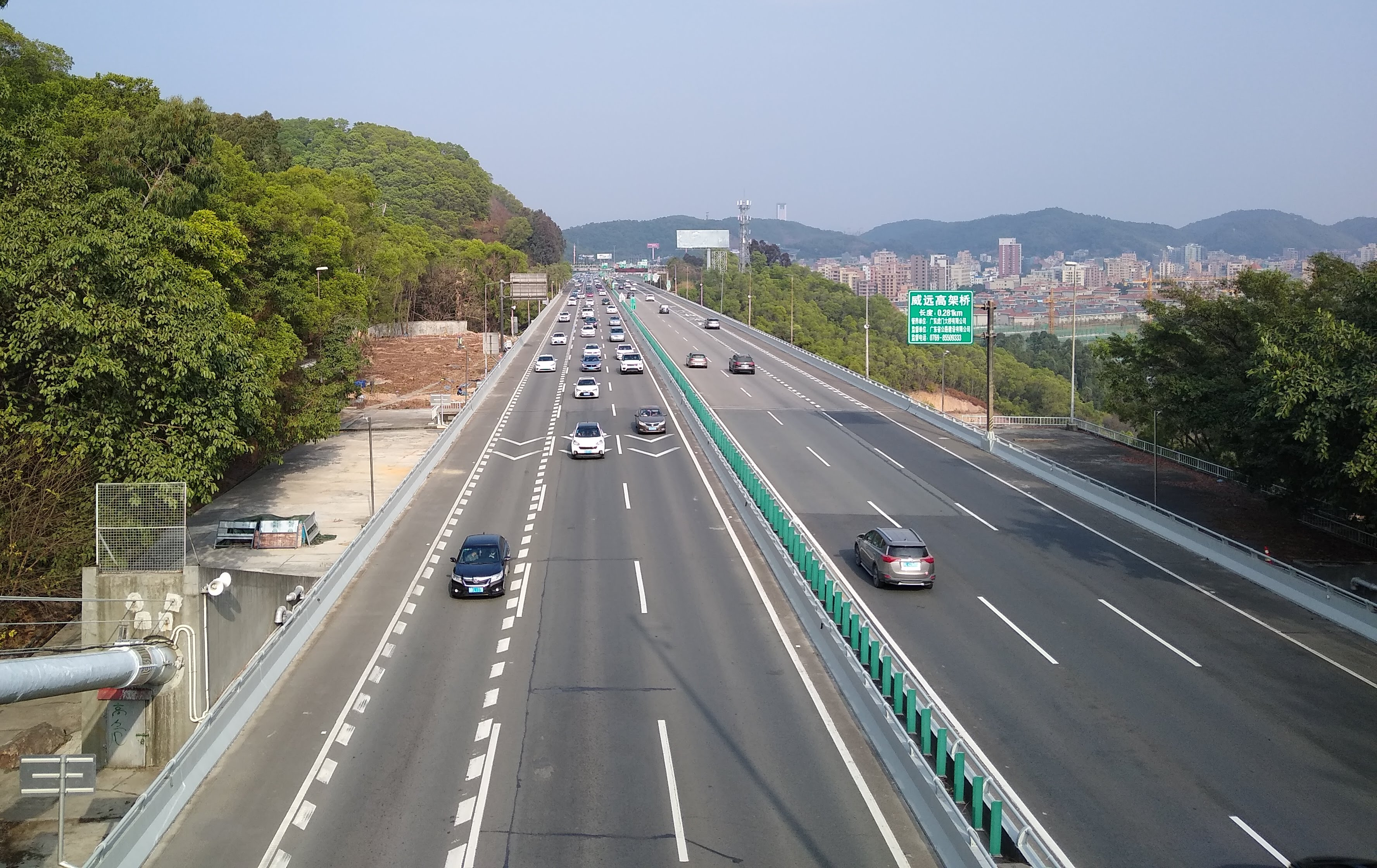

Route information
- Auxiliary route of G94

Major junctions
- East end: G1523 / G94 / Guangdong S20 in Dongguan, Guangdong
- West end: G94 / Guangdong S5 in Foshan, Guangdong

Location
- Country: China

Highway system
- National Trunk Highway System; Primary; Auxiliary; National Highways; Transport in China
| ← G94 | → G95 |

The Dongguan–Foshan Expressway (Chinese: 东莞—佛山高速公路), designated as G9411 and commonly referred to as the Guanfo Expressway (Chinese: 莞佛高速公路), is an expressway that connects Dongguan, Guangdong, China and Foshan, Guangdong. It is a spur of G94 Pearl River Delta Ring Expressway and is entirely in Guangdong Province.

It terminates at the G94 Pearl River Delta Ring Expressway on both ends, serving as an east–west connector inside the ring of the main expressway.
