= G94 Pearl River Delta Ring Expressway =

Road in Guangdong, China

Pearl River Delta Ring Expressway
- 珠江三角洲地区环线高速公路
- Pearl River Delta Ring Expressway 珠三角环线高速

Route information
- Length: 460 km (290 mi)

Major junctions
- Orbital around GD-HK-MO Greater Bay Area
- From: Longhua District, Shenzhen
- To: Chek Lap Kok, Hong Kong

Location
- Country: China

Highway system
- National Trunk Highway System; Primary; Auxiliary; National Highways; Transport in China
← G93	→ G9411

Pearl River Delta Ring Expressway
- Simplified Chinese: 珠三角环线高速公路
- Traditional Chinese: 珠三角環線高速公路
Transcriptions
Standard Mandarin
- Hanyu Pinyin: Zhū Sānjiǎo Huánxiàn Gāosùgōnglù
- Wade–Giles: Chu Sanch'iao Huanhsien K'aosukunglu
other Mandarin
- Xiao'erjing: جُوکِیَوْ خُوًاثِیًا قَوْسُوقْولُو
Yue: Cantonese
- Yale Romanization: Ju1 San1 jyau3 Hwan2 syan4 Gau1 su4 gung1 lu4
- Jyutping: Zyu1 Saam1 gok3 Waan1 sin3 Gou1 cuk1 gung1 lou6

The Pearl River Delta Ring Expressway (Chinese: 珠三角环线高速), officially the Pearl River Delta Region Ring Expressway (Chinese: 珠江三角洲地区环线高速公路) and designated G94, is an expressway in China, envisioned to encircle the Pearl River Delta region of Guangdong, Hong Kong and Macau. When complete, it will be 456 km (283 mi) in length. It only starts from Longhua District in Shenzhen and ends at North Lantau in Hong Kong.

Currently, only sections between Zhuhai and Sanshui District and from Zengcheng to Shenzhen are complete, entirely in the province of Guangdong.

The expressway ends at Meiguan Road and Beihuan Boulevard in Shenzhen, which is not near the border. Motorists must continue south along Huanggang Road to the Huanggang Port. There are no plans to connect the expressway directly to the border.

In Hong Kong, there are no plans to connect an expressway to the Shenzhen border. Hong Kong is not required to comply because it has its own highway system. Similarly, Macau is not required to comply and it is unknown if the Hong Kong and Macau sections will actually be expressways.

== Connections to Hong Kong and Macau ==
The existing end point is located at Hong Kong-Zhuhai-Macau Bridge Hong Kong Checkpoint, where it interchanges with multiple highway routes in Hong Kong and have different route numbering systems. Sections of the expressway in Hong Kong and Macau are observed only by Mainland China.

The expressway uses the Hong Kong-Zhuhai-Macau Bridge from Hong Kong to Macau and Zhuhai. It was opened on 24 October 2018.

For Hong Kong-Shenzhen border, there is no border connections, except Route 10 and Heung Yuen Wai Highway.

== Exits ==
Region	Km	type	Interchange	Connections	Notes
Longhua District, Shenzhen	0		Folk music	Meiguan Road, Meiban Avenue , Minzhi Avenue	Free section start
Longhua District, Shenzhen	1		South China Logistics	Minkang Road	
Longhua District, Shenzhen	2		Sakata	Brown Road	
Longhua District, Shenzhen	3		Wuhe Avenue	Wuhe Avenue Bell Road	Only the inner circle direction is in, and the outer circle direction is out
Longhua District, Shenzhen	4		Clear Lake	Wuhe Avenue Zhangheng Road	
Longhua District, Shenzhen	5		Shiqing Avenue	Shiqing Avenue	Only the inner circle direction is in, and the outer circle direction is out
Longhua District, Shenzhen	8/2886		Clear Lake	Shenhai Expressway	
Longhua District, Shenzhen	14		Guanlan	Sightseeing road	
Longhua District, Shenzhen	16		Guanlan		Free section ends
Longhua District, Shenzhen	17/32		Li Guang	Shenzhen Outer Ring Expressway	
Longhua District, Shenzhen	18		Four Li		Outer ring direction only
Dongguan City	19		Litang		
Dongguan City	20		Daping	Jiaoping Avenue	
Dongguan City	22/60		Tangxia	Huitang Expressway	
Dongguan City	32		Huangjiang	Gongchang Road (Provincial Highway 529)	
Dongguan City	35		Huangjiang		
Dongguan City	38/1469/0		There is a large garden	Yongguan Expressway Guanfo Expressway	
Dongguan City	41		Songshan Lake Dalang	Taichung Road Keelung Road	
Dongguan City	47		Shida Road	Shida Highway (Provincial Highway 122)	
Dongguan City	49/43		Liao Bu	Guanglong Expressway	
Dongguan City	52		Management Center	Fuzhu Mountain Foling Road	
Dongguan City	54		Shangtun	Dongguan Eastern Express Trunk Line Songshan Lake Avenue	
Dongguan City	59		Dongguan	Guanzhang Road	
Dongguan City	65		Guanlong Road	Guanlong Road	
Dongguan City	68		Stone tablet	Huancheng North Road, Minghua Road, Xisha Road	
Zengcheng District, Guangzhou	70		The river rises to the east of the rocky beach	Huizhao Expressway	
Zengcheng District, Guangzhou	79		stone	379 Provincial Highway East-West Avenue	
Zengcheng District, Guangzhou	82/1953		Pebble beach	Jiguang Expressway	
Zengcheng District, Guangzhou	85		Zengcheng	Lihu Avenue	
Zengcheng District, Guangzhou	86		Licheng		
Zengcheng District, Guangzhou	87		Licheng	Lixin Highway (Provincial Highway 119)	
Zengcheng District, Guangzhou			Yanshiling	Increase the Florida Expressway	
Zengcheng District, Guangzhou	90		Zhucun East	Zhucun Avenue East (National Highway 324)	
Zengcheng District, Guangzhou	99		Science and Education City	Jinxing Road	
Zengcheng District, Guangzhou	106/34		China-Singapore	Guanghe Expressway	
Zengcheng District, Guangzhou	113		Xin'an		
Conghua District, Guangzhou	118		Autumn maple		
Baiyun District, Guangzhou	122		Tai po	From Pu Expressway	
Baiyun District, Guangzhou	125		New Harmony	National Highway 105	
Huadu District, Guangzhou	130/3405		Yang He	Daguang Expressway	The starting point of the co-aligned section with the Daguang Expressway
Huadu District, Guangzhou	133(3408)		Airport North	Beijing-Hong Kong-Macao Expressway	
Huadu District, Guangzhou	138(3413)		In front of the mountain	Guanglian Expressway Shanqian Tourist Avenue East (Provincial Highway 381)	
Huadu District, Guangzhou	140(3415)		Golden valley	Jingu North Road Jingu South Road	
Huadu District, Guangzhou	142(3417)		Dadong	Feiyue Avenue	Guangzhou Baiyun International Airport
Huadu District, Guangzhou	145/3420		North of Flower Mountain	Leguang Expressway Daguang Expressway	and the end of the co-line section of the Daguang Expressway
Huadu District, Guangzhou	148		Red group	Chrysanthemum Stone Avenue (National Highway 106)	
Huadu District, Guangzhou	153		Furong Ridge	Furong Avenue	
Huadu District, Guangzhou	157		Six granite	Shanqian Tourist Avenue (Provincial Highway 381)	Only the inner circle direction is in, and the outer circle direction is out
Huadu District, Guangzhou	159		Bell House	Shanqian Tourist Avenue (Provincial Highway 381)	Only the inner circle direction is out, and the outer circle direction is in
Huadu District, Guangzhou	165		Lion Ridge	Xuguang Expressway	
Huadu District, Guangzhou	171		Maling	Shanqian Tourist Avenue (Provincial Highway 381)	Only the inner circle direction is in, and the outer circle direction is out
Huadu District, Guangzhou	175		Three pits	Shanqian Tourist Avenue (Provincial Highway 381)	Only the inner circle direction is out, and the outer circle direction is in
Huadu District, Guangzhou	177		Cathay Pacific	National Highway 107	
Huadu District, Guangzhou	180		Eastward	Foqing from the highway	
Sanshui District, Foshan City	183		Big Pond		
Sanshui District, Foshan City	186		Big Pond	Tangxi Avenue	
Sanshui District, Foshan City	192		Beijiangdong	National Highway 240	
Sanshui District, Foshan City	195		North Jiangxi		
Sihui City, Zhaoqing City	201		Dawang North	Dawang Avenue	
Sihui City, Zhaoqing City	207/2686		Zhang Dong	Erguang Expressway	
Sihui City, Zhaoqing City	211		Four meetings	Sihui Avenue South (Provincial Highway 263)	
Sihui City, Zhaoqing City	215/84		New foundation pool	Guangfo Zhaozhou Expressway	
Sihui City, Zhaoqing City	217		Big sand		
Dinghu District, Zhaoqing City	220		Lotus South	National Highway 321	
Dinghu District, Zhaoqing City	223		Dinghu		
Dinghu District, Zhaoqing City	225		Yong'an	Yong'an Avenue	
Dinghu District, Zhaoqing City	232		Shapu	182 Township Road	
Gaoyao District, Zhaoqing City	240/27		Fuller	Guangzhou-Kunming Expressway	
Gaoyao District, Zhaoqing City	251		Huilong		
Gaoming District, Foshan City	254		Ming City		
Gaoming District, Foshan City	259/152/99		Tanlang	Guanfo Expressway Guangtai Expressway	
Gaoming District, Foshan City	268		people	Hopewell Avenue (State Highway 359)	
Gaoming District, Foshan City	276		Yang He	Lotus Poplar Avenue	
Heshan City, Jiangmen City	284		Longkou		
Heshan City, Jiangmen City	287		Longkou	270 Provincial Highway	
Heshan City, Jiangmen City	293		Shangri-La	State Highway 325	Jiangmen North Railway Station, the center of Zhuxi logistics hub
Heshan City, Jiangmen City	300/3124		Quindong	Shenhai Expressway	It is located at the junction of Heshan City and Pengjiang District
Pengjiang District, Jiangmen City	302		Lion Lane	Guangzhou-Zhongjiang Expressway	Located at the junction of Heshan City and Pengjiang District, the direction of S20 Guangzhou is limited to the inner circle direction and the outer circle direction, and the Jiangmen direction is limited to the inner circle direction and the outer circle direction
Pengjiang District, Jiangmen City	304/46		Tangxia	Tongle Road	Binjiang New Area
Pengjiang District, Jiangmen City	306		Straight to the mouth	Yinzhou Lake Expressway	
Pengjiang District, Jiangmen City	309		Du Ruan North	Du Ruan North 2nd Road	
Pengjiang District, Jiangmen City	314/147		Lotus Mountain	Shenten Expressway	The starting point of the co-aligned section with the Shencen Expressway
Pengjiang District, Jiangmen City	317(144)		Long Bay	Jiangmen Avenue is in the middle of Jiangmen Avenue and south	Jiangmen Station (Zhuxi Hub)
Jianghai District, Jiangmen City	323(138)/107		Four villages	Guangfo Jiangzhu Expressway	The starting point of the co-linear section of the Guangzhou-Foshan-Jiangzhou-Zhuhai Expressway/Jiangmen High-tech Zone
Jianghai District, Jiangmen City	326(135)/104		Dragon Creek	Guangzhou-Foshan Jiangzhu Expressway Jiangmu Road	The end of the co-line section of the Guangzhou-Foshan-Jiangzhou-Zhuhai Expressway/Jiangmen High-tech Port-High-tech Zone Public Wharf
Jianghai District, Jiangmen City	330(131)		Coast		Jianghai Station
Zhongshan City	331(130)		To the north of the horizontal railing	Zhongshan West Ring Road	
Zhongshan City	335(126)		Horizontal bar	Chang'an North Road	
Zhongshan City	340(121)		Little Lan	In the middle of Xiaolan Industrial Avenue	
Zhongshan City	343(118)		Little Lan		
Zhongshan City	345(116)		Zhennan	Xiaolan branch line	The inner circle direction is limited to the direction of S5311 Xiaolan hub, and the outer circle direction is limited to the direction of S5311 Zhongshanxi hub
Zhongshan City	346(115)		Little Lan East	National Highway 105	
Zhongshan City	347/114		Zhongjiang	Shencen Expressway Guangzhou-Zhuhai West Line Expressway	The end of the co-linear section with the Shencen Expressway
Zhongshan City	352		Zhongshan West	Xiaolan branch line	
Zhongshan City	357		Sand Creek		
Zhongshan City	360		Leisure	Zhongyang Expressway	
Zhongshan City	363		Sand Creek		
Zhongshan City	368		South of Zhongshan	National Highway 105	
Zhongshan City	377		Banfu	National Highway 105	
Zhongshan City	384		Three townships	Nanlong Road	
Zhongshan City	389/114/0		Moon ring	Guangzhou-Macao Expressway Western Coastal Expressway	The starting point of the colinear section with the Guangzhou-Macao Expressway
Zhongshan City	397(122)		Xinfeng Wei	Xianghai Expressway	
Xiangzhou District, Zhuhai City	399(124)		Nanping	Zhuhai Avenue (Provincial Highway 366)	Free section start
Xiangzhou District, Zhuhai City	404/127		Hongwan	Zhutai Expressway Gimhae Expressway	It is at the end of the co-track section with the Guangzhou-Macao Expressway from Honghe Bridge to Hezhou South Interchange
Xiangzhou District, Zhuhai City	406		North of Hengqin	Nanqin Road	
Xiangzhou District, Zhuhai City	412		South Bay	South South Road	
Xiangzhou District, Zhuhai City	421		Gongbei	Changsheng Road	Only the inner circle direction is out, and the outer circle direction is in
Xiangzhou District, Zhuhai City	431		Zhuhai-Macao Port Artificial Island	Hong Kong-Zhuhai-Macao Bridge Zhuhai Highway Port	The Hong Kong-Zhuhai-Macao Bridge Macao Border Inspection Building to Macau is only available for cross-border vehicles with valid passes
Xiangzhou District, Zhuhai City	431		Hong Kong-Zhuhai-Macao Bridge		It collects tolls from the Hong Kong-Zhuhai-Macao Bridge and is the only expressway toll station ETC in Guangdong Province that supports Autotoll
Xiangzhou District, Zhuhai City	434		Jiuzhou Waterway Bridge		
Xiangzhou District, Zhuhai City	440		River and sea direct ship channel bridge		
Xiangzhou District, Zhuhai City	450		Qingzhou Waterway Bridge		
Xiangzhou District, Zhuhai City	455		Western artificial island White Dolphin Island		The Hong Kong-Zhuhai-Macao Bridge Maintenance and Rescue Centre has an emergency U-turn lane that can only be used by staff vehicles and emergency rescue vehicles
Xiangzhou District, Zhuhai City	461		Eastern artificial island Blue Dolphin Island		The Emergency U-turn lane bridge observation deck (open to designated tour groups only) is currently only available to staff vehicles, designated tour group vehicles and emergency rescue vehicles
Guangdong-Hong Kong boundary	463		Guangdong-Hong Kong boundary	Hong Kong-Zhuhai-Macao Bridge Hong Kong Link (Hong Kong)	Hong Kong
1.000 miles = 1.609 kilometers; 1.000 kilometers = 0.621 miles Parallel sections • Closed/canceled • Restricted access • Not open

== See also ==
- Transport in China
