= Ying Prefecture (Anhui) =

Historical administrative division in Anhui, China

Yingzhou or Ying Prefecture (Chinese: 潁州) was a zhou (prefecture) in Imperial China in modern-day northwestern Anhui, seated in modern Fuyang. In 1735, the Qing dynasty renamed it to Yingzhou Prefecture (潁州府). It existed intermittently from 528 until 1912.

The modern-day Yingzhou District in Fuyang retains its name.

== Geography ==
The administrative region of Yingzhou in the Tang dynasty falls within modern northwestern Anhui. It probably includes parts of modern:

- Under the administration of Fuyang:
  - Fuyang: Yingzhou District, Yingdong District and Yingquan District
  - Jieshou
  - Taihe County
  - Linquan County
  - Funan County
  - Yingshang County
- Under the administration of Huainan:
  - Fengtai County

In the Qing dynasty it also includes parts of modern:

- Under the administration of Bozhou:
  - Lixin County
  - Mengcheng County
  - Woyang County
- Under the administration of Lu'an:
  - Huoqiu County
