= Wuming, Anhui =

Wuming 伍明镇
- Town
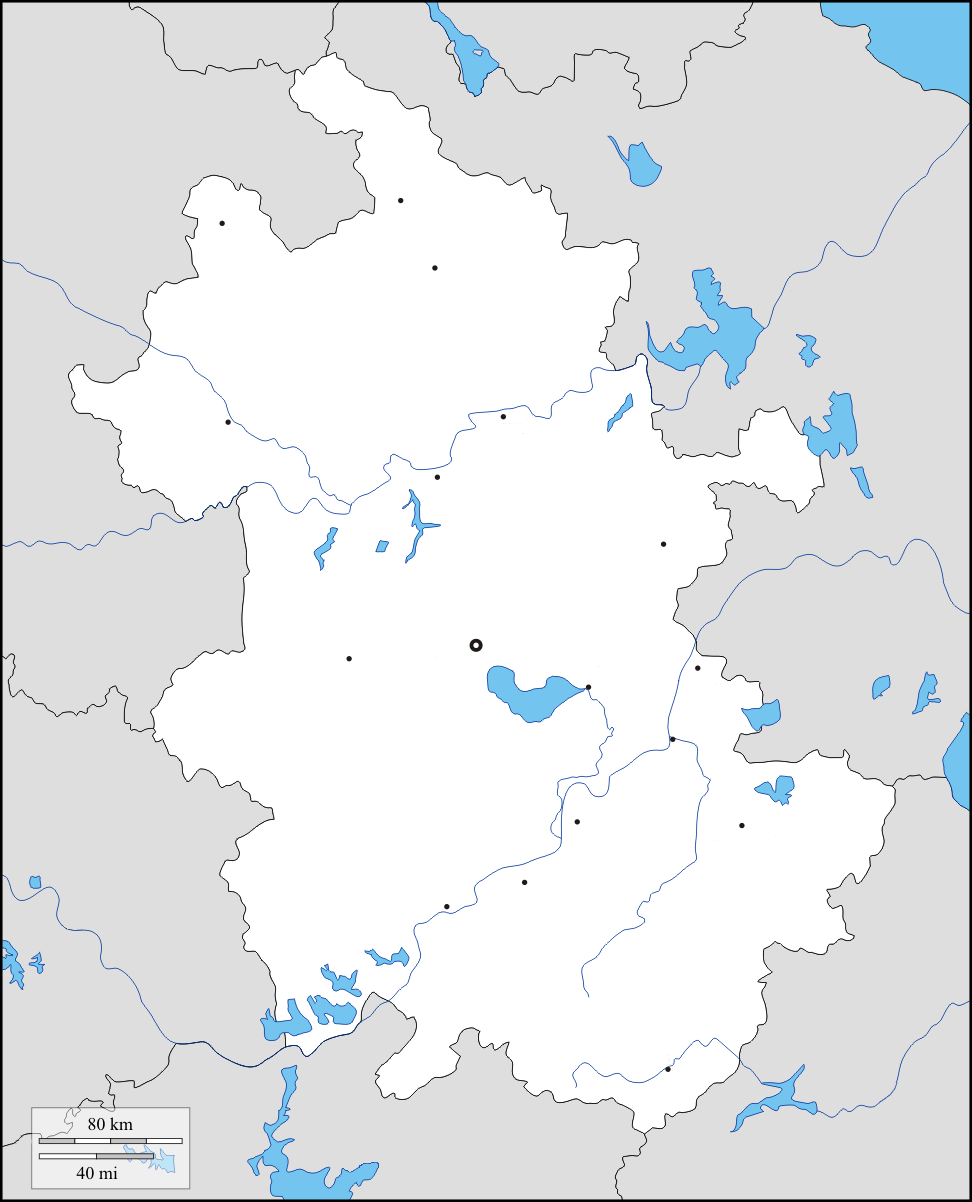
- Location in Anhui
- Coordinates: 33°3′28″N 115°51′43″E
- Country: People's Republic of China
- Province: Anhui
- Prefecture-level city: Fuyang
- District: Yingquan District
- Time zone: UTC+8 (China Standard)

Wuming (Chinese: 伍明; pinyin: Wǔmíng) is a town under the administration of Yingquan District, Fuyang, Anhui, China. As of 2023, it administers three residential communities — Wuming, Siqian (寺前), and Sihou (寺后) — and the following seventeen villages:

- Qinglong Village (青龙村)
- Chenliu Village (陈刘村)
- Liangying Village (梁营村)
- Zhengzhai Village (郑寨村)
- Wali Village (洼李村)
- Sanmenying Village (三门营村)
- Zhangyuan Village (张袁村)
- Xiaxiao Village (夏小村)
- Suji Village (苏集村)
- Yuansi Village (袁寺村)
- Zhangji Village (章集村)
- Gongzhuang Village (巩庄村)
- Pengzhuang Village (彭庄村)
- Qiying Village (齐营村)
- Dianji Village (店集村)
- Dianxi Village (店西村)
- Wangzhai Village (王寨村)
