= Chang Kai =

Chinese physicist

- 常凯
- Born: August 1964 (age 61–62); Qianshan, Anhui, China
- Education: Fuyang Normal University; Beijing Normal University
- Scientific career
- Fields: Semiconductor
- Workplaces: Chinese Academy of Sciences (CAS)
- Academic advisors: Ma Benkun

Chinese name
- Traditional Chinese: 常凱
- Simplified Chinese: 常凯
Transcriptions
Standard Mandarin
- Hanyu Pinyin: Cháng Kǎi

Chang Kai (Chinese: 常凯; born August 1964) is a Chinese physicist currently serving as research fellow at the Institute of Semiconductors, Chinese Academy of Sciences (CAS).

== Biography ==
Chang was born in Qianshan, Anhui in August 1964. In 1984 he graduated from Fuyang Normal University. In 1986 he graduated from Beijing Normal University, earning his Doctor of Science degree. He was a postdoc at the State Key Laboratory of Superlattice, Institute of Semiconductors of the Chinese Academy of Sciences (CAS). In 1998 he became a visiting scholar at the University of Antwerp in Belgium, he remained there until 2001. He is now a research fellow at the Institute of Semiconductors, Chinese Academy of Sciences (CAS).

== Honours and awards ==
- 2004 State Natural Science Award (Second Class)
- 2013 Huang Kun Solid State and Semiconductor Physics Award (黄昆固体物理和半导体物理奖)
- 2019 Academician of the Chinese Academy of Sciences (CAS)
