= Fangji, Anhui =

Coordinates: 32.586°N 115.402°E

Fangji
- Town

Chinese transcription(s)
  - Chinese: 方集镇
  - Pinyin: Fāngjí Zhèn
- Interactive map of Fangji
- Country: China
- Province: Anhui
- Prefecture: Fuyang
- County: Funan
- Time zone: UTC+8 (China Standard Time)

Fangji is a township-level division situated in Funan County, Fuyang, Anhui, China.

== See also ==
- List of township-level divisions of Anhui
