= Wanghua, Anhui =

Coordinates: 32.5650°N 115.6350°E

Wanghua
- Town

Chinese transcription(s)
  - Chinese: 王化镇
  - Pinyin: Wánghuà Zhèn
- Interactive map of Wanghua
- Country: China
- Province: Anhui
- Prefecture: Fuyang
- County: Funan
- Time zone: UTC+8 (China Standard Time)

Wanghua is a township-level division situated in Funan County, Fuyang, Anhui, China.

== See also ==
- List of township-level divisions of Anhui
