= Xincun =

Xincun (Chinese: 新村; pinyin: Xīncūn; lit. 'new village') may refer to the following locations in China:

- Xincun Hui Ethnic Township, Huanghua, Hebei
- Xincun, Fangshan District, Beijing, in Shidu, Fangshan District, Beijing
- Xincun Subdistrict, Beijing, in Fengtai District, Beijing
- Xincun Subdistrict, Wuhan, in Jiang'an District, Wuhan, Hubei

Towns

- Xincun, Funan County, Anhui
- Xincun, Lingshui County, in Lingshui Li Autonomous County, Hainan
- Xincun, Xinzheng, Henan
- Xincun, Chuxiong, in Chuxiong City, Yunnan
