= Huilong, Anhui =

Huilong 会龙镇
- Town
- Interactive map of Huilong
- Coordinates: 32°42′10″N 115°28′27″E
- Country: People's Republic of China
- Province: Anhui
- Prefecture-level city: Fuyang
- County: Funan
- Village-level divisions: 11 villages

Area
  - Total: 56 km^{2} (22 sq mi)
- Elevation: 37 m (121 ft)

Population (2012)
  - Total: 46,000
  - Density: 820/km^{2} (2,100/sq mi)
- Time zone: UTC+8 (China Standard)
- Area code: 0558

Huilong (simplified Chinese: 会龙; traditional Chinese: 會龍; pinyin: Huìlóng) is a town of Funan County in northwestern Anhui province, China, located 12 kilometres (7.5 mi) northwest of the county seat. On 6 July 2012, the provincial government approved the upgrade of Huilong, former a township, to a town. As of 2012, it has 11 villages under its administration, covering an area of 56 square kilometres (22 sq mi) and a population of 46,000. The town is nicknamed the "home of chili peppers" (辣椒之乡) and has a rapidly growing industrial economy.

== See also ==
- List of township-level divisions of Anhui
