= Bali River Scenic Area =

Tourist attraction

Bali River Scenic Area is a AAAAA tourist attraction located in Balihe Town, Yingshang County, Fuyang, Anhui. It borders the Huai River to the south and the Ying River to the east.
