= Xiao Zuoxin =

Chinese politician

Xiao Zuoxin is a former mayor of Fuyang, Anhui, China. He and his wife were convicted of corruption on November 29, 2000. He is currently serving life imprisonment. His wife, Zhou Jimei, was sentenced to death.

In January 2007, Xiao's property was publicly auctioned.
