= Wuming =

Wuming may refer to:

- Wuming District, in Nanning, Guangxi, China
- Wuming Mountain, in Taiwan
- Hidden Blade (無名; Wúmíng), 2023 Chinese film by Cheng Er
- Wuming, Anhui, town of Fuyang, Anhui, China

== See also ==
- Wu Ming, a group of Italian authors
