= Erlang, Taihe County =

Erlang 二郎镇
- Town
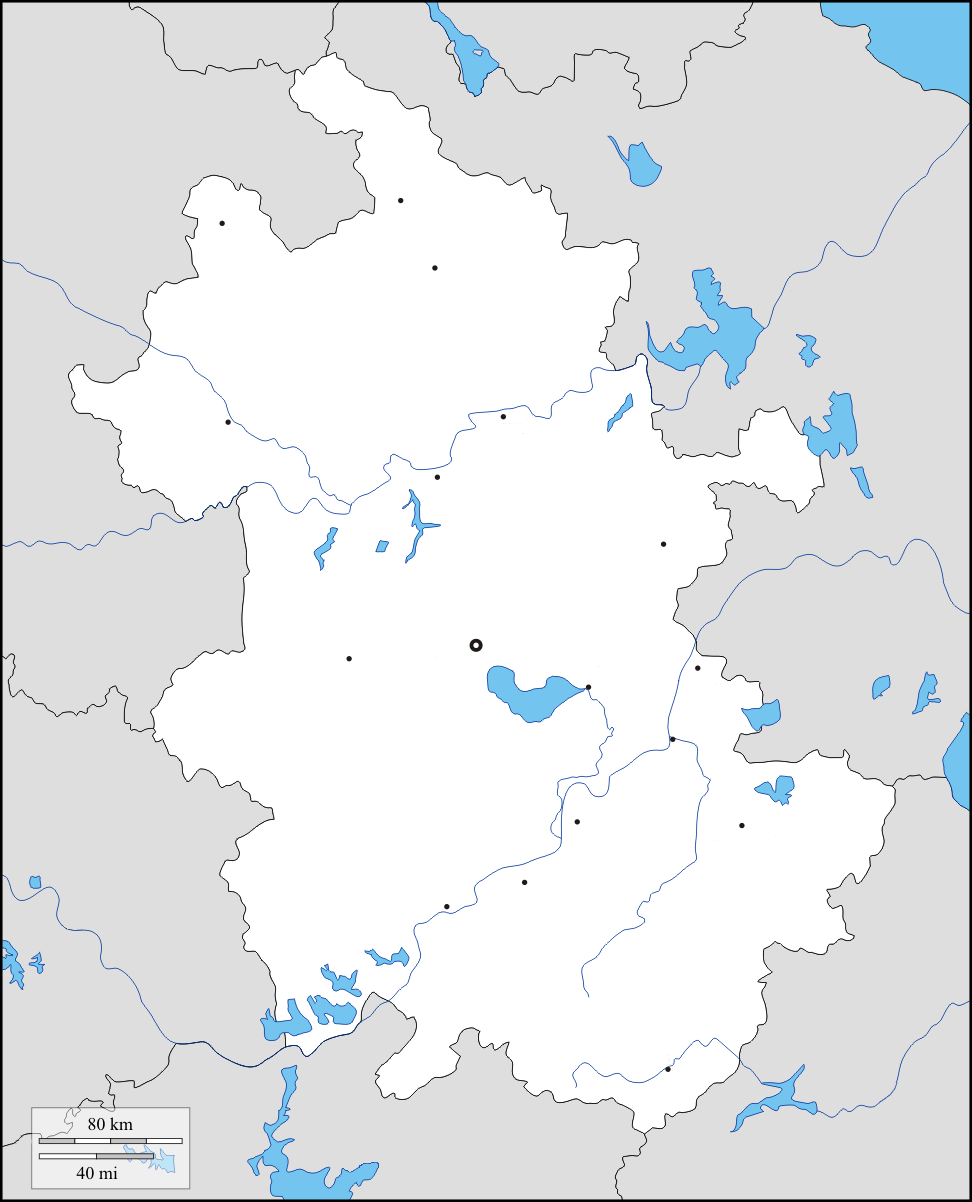
- Location in Anhui
- Coordinates: 33°25′19″N 115°48′16″E
- Country: People's Republic of China
- Province: Anhui
- Prefecture-level City: Fuyang
- County: Taihe County
- Time zone: UTC+8 (China Standard)

Erlang (Chinese: 二郎; pinyin: Èrláng) is a town under the administration of Taihe County, Anhui, China. As of 2023, it administers the following six villages:

- Erlangxin (Erlang New) Village (二郎新村)
- Jixixin (Jixi New) Village (集西新村)
- Longwuxin (Longwu New) Village (龙伍新村)
- Feinanxin (Feinan New) Village (淝南新村)
- Suzhaixin (Suzhai New) Village (苏寨新村)
- Tongdaxin (Tongda New) Village (通达新村)

== See also ==
- List of township-level divisions of Anhui
