= Zhuzhai =

Zhuzhai (朱寨镇) may refer to the following locations in China:

- Zhuzhai, Anhui
- Zhuzhai, Jiangsu, town in Pei County
