= Huanggang (disambiguation) =

Huanggang is a city in Hubei, China.

Huanggang may also refer to:

- Huanggang, Shenzhen, an area in Shenzhen, China
- Huanggang, Funan County, a town in Anhui, China
- Huanggang, Raoping County (黄冈镇), a town in Raoping County, Chaozhou, Guangdong, China
