= Tianji =

Tianji may refer to:

- Tianji.com, Chinese social networking website
- Tianji, Funan County, Anhui, China
- Tianji Subdistrict, Huainan, Anhui, China
- Guangxi Tianji F.C., Chinese football club
- Zeta Herculis, a star also named Tianji

== See also ==
- Tian Ji (fl. 4th century BC), military general of the state of Qi
