= Zhuzhai, Anhui =

Coordinates: 32.7355°N 115.8809°E

Zhuzhai 朱寨镇
- Town

Chinese transcription(s)
  - Chinese: 朱寨镇
  - Pinyin: Zhūzhài Zhèn
- Interactive map of Zhuzhai
- Country: China
- Province: Anhui
- Prefecture: Fuyang
- County: Funan
- Time zone: UTC+8 (China Standard Time)

Zhuzhai is a township-level division situated in Funan County, Fuyang, Anhui, China.

== See also ==
- List of township-level divisions of Anhui
