= Taihe County, Anhui =

Coordinates: 33°19′57″N 115°40′06″E

Taihe 太和县 Taiho
- County
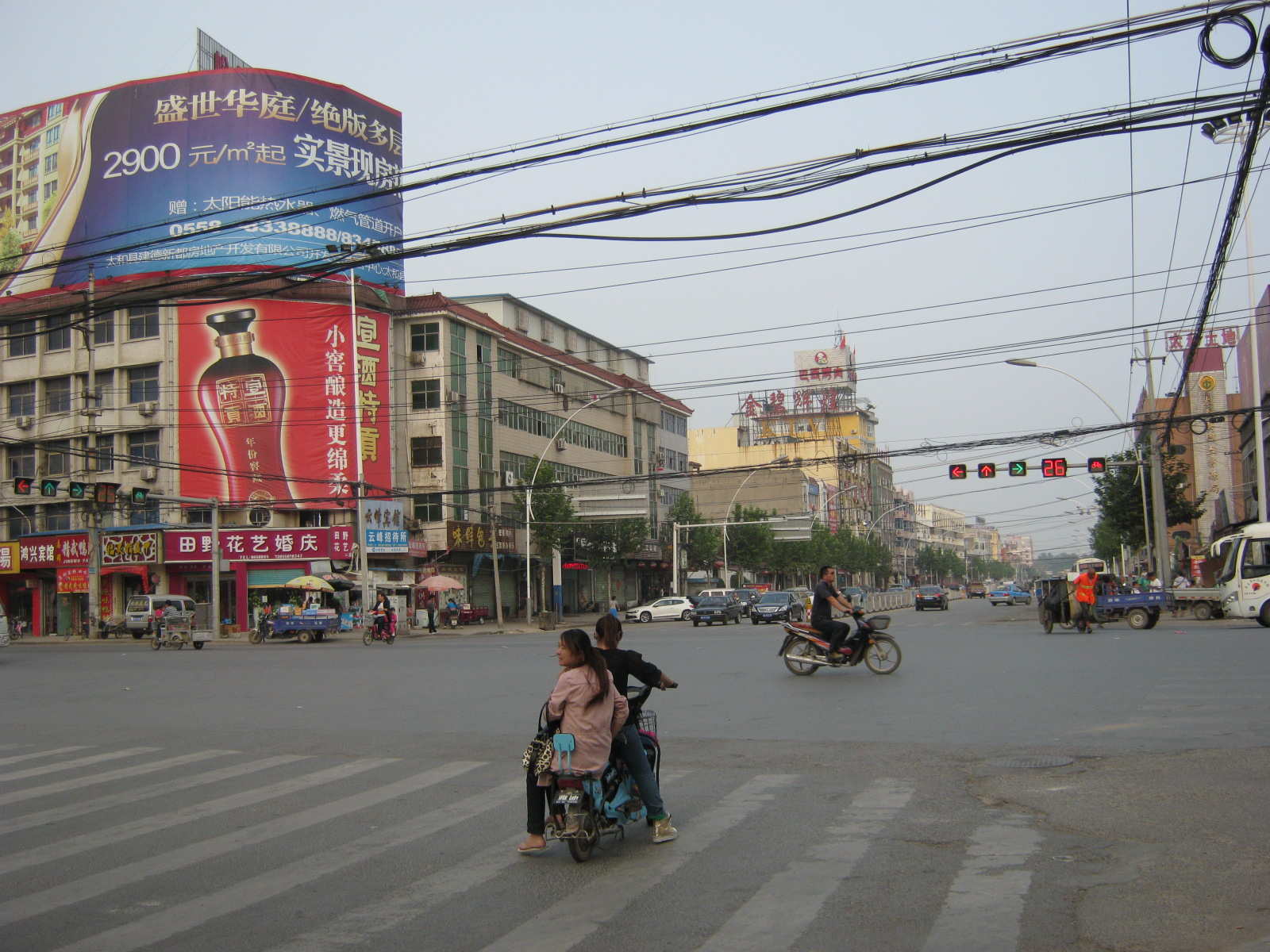
- Interactive map of Taihe
- Country: People's Republic of China
- Province: Anhui
- Prefecture-level city: Fuyang

Area
  - Total: 1,867 km^{2} (721 sq mi)

Population (2019)
  - Total: 1,782,000
- Time zone: UTC+8 (China Standard)
- Postal code: 236600

Taihe County (Chinese: 太和县; pinyin: Tàihé Xiàn) is a county in northwestern Anhui Province, China, bordering Henan Province to the north. It is under the administration of Fuyang City.

== History ==
Ancient Times

The area belonged to Yu Province.

Spring and Autumn Period

It was part of Song, known as Lushang (鹿上), and also called Xingqiu (邢丘) and Linqiu (廪丘). The State of Song formed alliances with the Qi and Chu here, known as the "Alliance of Lushang" (鹿上之盟).

Warring States Period

It was part of Wei. Su Qin persuaded King Xiang of Wei, referring to the area as "New Qi" (新郪), which indicates Taihe. Later, it was annexed by Chu.

Qin Dynasty

After unifying the nation, Qin established Xinyang County (新阳县), under the jurisdiction of Yingchuan Commandery (颍川郡).

Han Dynasty

Counties such as Xiyang (细阳), Lechang (乐昌), and Xinqi(新郪), Song (宋) were established and placed under the jurisdiction of Runan Commandery (汝南郡).

Three Kingdoms

The area belonged to Cao Wei. In the second year of Jingchu (238 CE) (景初二年), it was placed under Qiao Commandery (谯郡).

Jin Dynasty

Xiyang County (细阳县) was abolished. Song County was reassigned to Ruyin Commandery (汝阴郡).

Northern Wei

During the Taihe Period (477-499 CE), Song County was abolished. Chenliu County (陈留县) was established.

Sui Dynasty

Chenliu County was renamed Yingyang (颍阳县).

Tang Dynasty

In the first year of Zhenguan (627 CE), Yingyang County was abolished and merged into Ruyin (汝阴, now Fuyang).

Song Dynasty

In the sixth year of Kaibao (973 CE), Wanshou County was established in Baichi Town, Ruyin County, under the jurisdiction of Yingzhou (颍州). In the first year of Xuanhe (1119 CE), the county was renamed Taihe (泰和). By the end of the Shaoxing period, the area was occupied by Jin. After Jin's fall, it returned to the Song Dynasty.

Yuan Dynasty

In the second year of Zhiyuan (1265 CE), Taihe County was merged into Yingzhou. In the eighth year of Dade (1304 CE), the county was reestablished. The county was relocated to its current location, under the jurisdiction of Yingzhou, and later under Runing Prefecture (汝宁府).

Ming Dynasty

The area belonged to Yingzhou, Fengyang Prefecture (凤阳府), under Nanjing's administration. In the third year of Hongwu (1370 CE), The county changed its name from "Taihe" to "Taihe" with different "Tai" (泰和 -> 太和).

Qing Dynasty

In the second year of Yongzheng (1724 CE), the county was transferred to Bozhou (亳州). In the thirteenth year of Yongzheng (1735 CE), Yingzhou was promoted to a prefecture, and the county was transferred back to Yingzhou Prefecture.

Republic of China

In the first year of the Republic (1912), Yingzhou Prefecture was abolished, and the county was directly under Anhui Province. In the third year of the Republic (1914), it was placed under Huaisi Circuit (淮泗道) and later the Seventh Administrative Supervision District of Anhui Province (安徽省第七行政督察区). In the thirty-fifth year of the Republic (1946), during the Chinese Civil War, the northern part of the county was assigned to Lubuotai County (鹿亳太县), and the northeastern part to Fubei County (阜北县). In the thirty-seventh year of the Republic (1948), the entire county belonged to forces of the Chinese Communist Party, and Taihe County was established.

People's Republic of China

In 1949, the county was under Fuyang Special Administrative Region of Northern Anhui (皖北行署阜阳专区). In 1951, it became part of Fuyang Special Administrative Region of Anhui Province (安徽省阜阳专区). In January 1959, it was merged with Jieshou to form Shoutai County (首太县). In April 1959, Taihe County was restored. On April 29, 2019, the Anhui Provincial Government approved Taihe County's removal from the list of poverty-stricken counties.

== Administrative divisions ==
In the present, Taihe County has 26 towns and 5 townships.

26 towns

- Chengguan (城关镇)
- Jiuxian (旧县镇)
- Shuizhen (税镇镇)
- Pitiaosun (皮条孙镇)
- Yuanqiang (原墙镇)
- Niqiu (倪邱镇)
- Lixing (李兴镇)
- Daxin (大新镇)
- Xiaokou (肖口镇)
- Guanji (关集镇)
- Santa (三塔镇)
- Shuangfu (双浮镇)
- Caimiao (蔡庙镇)
- Santang (三堂镇)
- Miaolaoji (苗老集镇)
- Zhaomiao (赵庙镇)
- Gongji (宫集镇)
- Fentai (坟台镇)
- Hongshan (洪山镇)
- Qingqian (清浅镇)
- Wuxing (五星镇)
- Gaomiao (高庙镇)
- Sangying (桑营镇)
- Damiaoji (大庙集镇)
- Ruanqiao (阮桥镇)
- Shuangmiao (双庙镇)

5 townships

- Huzong (胡总乡)
- Zhaoji (赵集乡)
- Guomiao (郭庙乡)
- Maji (马集乡)
- Erlang (二郎乡)

== Places of Interest ==
=== Shaying River National Wetland Park (沙颍河国家湿地公园) ===
Shaying River National Wetland Park surrounds the southwest part of Taihe County. Stretching from the Genglou Water Conservancy Hub to the anchorage area downstream of the Second Bridge, it spans a total length of 13.5 kilometers and covers an area of 714 hectares. The park is divided into four functional zones: ecological conservation, leisure experiences, ecological function displays, and service management. It is a wetland park based on ecological restoration, showcasing the essence of Taihe culture, highlighting the cultural imprints of the Shaying River, and telling the stories of Taihe. Its primary feature is diversified leisure activities. In 2017, the park was awarded as one of the "Top Ten Scenic Spots" in Fuyang City.

=== Taihe Confucian Temple (太和文庙) ===
Adjacent to the park is Taihe Confucian Temple. The main gate of the temple displays a plaque with the characters "Taihe Vitality" (太和元气). In front of the gate is the Confucian Temple Square.

Taihe Confucian Temple is located at No. 35, Hongxue Street, Chengguan Town, Taihe County, Anhui Province. Covering an area of 4,620 square meters (approximately 7 acres), the temple was originally built in the eighth year of the Yuan Dynasty's Dade reign (1304 CE) by Darughachi Li Ying. It was damaged during wars and was rebuilt in the fifth year of the Hongwu reign of the Ming Dynasty (1372 CE). The temple's main hall is 20 meters wide and 10 meters deep, with a single-eaved hipped roof covered with glazed tiles. The building combines the beam-lift and post-and-lintel architectural styles, reflecting a mixture of northern and southern architectural features. The structure has a palatial wooden framework, with a roof adorned with glazed tiles, ridge animals, and flying eaves on the corners. The temple has a history of over 700 years.

== Honorary Title ==
The Chinese government typically issues specific nomination documents on an annual basis to recognize the achievements of particular regions in agriculture, industry, commerce, and other fields. This section records some of the honorary titles that Taihe County has earned over the past decade.

- In December 2018, Taihe County was selected as one of the "Top 100 Counties in China for Investment Potential."
- On September 21, 2019, Taihe County was listed among the "Top 10 Counties (Cities) for Comprehensive Manufacturing Development in Anhui Province" and the "Top 10 Counties (Cities) for Fastest Manufacturing Growth in Anhui Province."
- On December 6, 2019, Taihe County was included in the "2019 Top 100 Counties (Cities) for Investment Potential in China."
- In June 2020, Taihe County was awarded the title of "Nominee City for Anhui Provincial Civilized City."
- On July 10, 2020, Taihe County was selected as a "2020 National E-commerce Demonstration County for Rural Development."
- On July 30, 2021, Taihe County was included in the "National List of Counties for Agricultural Science and Technology Modernization Pilot Projects."
- On September 8, 2021, Taihe County was selected by the National Energy Administration for the "County-Wide Rooftop Distributed Photovoltaic Development Pilot Program."
- In 2023, Taihe County was ranked 10th in the "2023 Top 20 Counties in Anhui Province by Economic Scale."

== Climate ==
Climate data for Taihe, elevation 31 m (102 ft), (1991–2020 normals, extremes 1981–2010)
Month	Jan	Feb	Mar	Apr	May	Jun	Jul	Aug	Sep	Oct	Nov	Dec	Year
Record high °C (°F)	19.2 (66.6)	27.5 (81.5)	32.7 (90.9)	34.1 (93.4)	38.3 (100.9)	39.9 (103.8)	41.4 (106.5)	39.6 (103.3)	38.7 (101.7)	34.4 (93.9)	28.1 (82.6)	22.2 (72.0)	41.4 (106.5)
Mean daily maximum °C (°F)	6.6 (43.9)	10.1 (50.2)	15.4 (59.7)	21.9 (71.4)	27.1 (80.8)	31.3 (88.3)	32.3 (90.1)	31.1 (88.0)	27.6 (81.7)	22.7 (72.9)	15.5 (59.9)	8.9 (48.0)	20.9 (69.6)
Daily mean °C (°F)	1.8 (35.2)	4.8 (40.6)	10.0 (50.0)	16.3 (61.3)	21.6 (70.9)	26.0 (78.8)	28.0 (82.4)	26.7 (80.1)	22.3 (72.1)	16.8 (62.2)	10.1 (50.2)	3.9 (39.0)	15.7 (60.2)
Mean daily minimum °C (°F)	−1.8 (28.8)	0.7 (33.3)	5.4 (41.7)	11.1 (52.0)	16.4 (61.5)	21.2 (70.2)	24.3 (75.7)	23.3 (73.9)	18.2 (64.8)	12.3 (54.1)	5.9 (42.6)	0.2 (32.4)	11.4 (52.6)
Record low °C (°F)	−14.7 (5.5)	−15.2 (4.6)	−6.7 (19.9)	−2.1 (28.2)	4.1 (39.4)	12.0 (53.6)	17.4 (63.3)	14.4 (57.9)	7.5 (45.5)	−0.2 (31.6)	−8.5 (16.7)	−18.0 (−0.4)	−18.0 (−0.4)
Average precipitation mm (inches)	23.5 (0.93)	28.0 (1.10)	43.7 (1.72)	53.5 (2.11)	73.0 (2.87)	135.2 (5.32)	222.7 (8.77)	133.4 (5.25)	76.6 (3.02)	55.1 (2.17)	41.0 (1.61)	20.1 (0.79)	905.8 (35.66)
Average precipitation days (≥ 0.1 mm)	5.7	6.9	7.5	7.5	9.2	8.3	11.9	11.1	8.6	7.4	7.0	5.0	96.1
Average snowy days	4.3	2.7	1.2	0	0	0	0	0	0	0	0.8	2.1	11.1
Average relative humidity (%)	67	68	63	65	67	68	79	81	77	68	69	66	70
Mean monthly sunshine hours	121.9	126.5	160.3	191.9	199.7	183.3	189.4	175.0	156.0	154.3	140.9	130.4	1,929.6
Percentage possible sunshine	38	41	43	49	46	43	44	43	42	44	45	42	43
Source: China Meteorological Administration
