= Huanggang, Anhui =

Coordinates: 32.619°N 115.816°E

Huanggang 黄岗镇
- Town

Chinese transcription(s)
  - Chinese: 黄岗镇
  - Pinyin: Huánggǎng Zhèn
- Interactive map of Huanggang
- Country: China
- Province: Anhui
- Prefecture: Fuyang
- County: Funan
- Time zone: UTC+8 (China Standard Time)

Huanggang is a township-level division situated in Funan County, Fuyang, Anhui, China.

== See also ==
- List of township-level divisions of Anhui
