= Tianji, Funan County =

Tianji 田集镇
- Town
- Location in China
- Coordinates: 32°43′38″N 115°37′34″E
- Country: People's Republic of China
- Province: Anhui
- Prefecture-level city: Fuyang
- County: Funan County
- Time zone: UTC+8 (China Standard)

Tianji (Chinese: 田集; pinyin: Tiánjí) is a town in Funan County, Anhui. As of 2020, it administers three residential neighborhoods: Tianji, Dongyue (东岳), and Sunzhai (孙寨), as well as the following nine villages:

- Zhaowu Village (赵吴村)
- Chengzhai Village (程寨村)
- Zhangji Village (张集村)
- Yangzhai Village (杨寨村)
- Renmiao Village (任庙村)
- Wangda Village (王大村)
- Panglao Village (庞老村)
- Zhaolao Village (赵老村)
- Liulin Village (柳林村)
