= Funan County =

County in Anhui, China

Funan County 阜南县
- County
- Interactive map of Funan County
- Coordinates: 32°39′32″N 115°35′46″E
- Country: People's Republic of China
- Province: Anhui
- Prefecture-level city: Fuyang
- County seat: Lucheng

Area
  - Total: 1,801 km^{2} (695 sq mi)

Population (2019)
  - Total: 1,736,000
  - Density: 963.9/km^{2} (2,497/sq mi)
- Time zone: UTC+8 (China Standard)
- Postal code: 236300
- Website: www.funan.gov.cn

Funan County (simplified Chinese: 阜南县; traditional Chinese: 阜南縣; pinyin: Fùnán Xiàn) is a county in the northwest of Anhui province, China, bordering Henan province to the south. It is under the administration of the prefecture-level city of Fuyang.

Funan has an area of 1,768 km^{2} (683 sq mi) and a population of 1,553,000.

== Administrative divisions ==
Funan County administers 21 towns and 8 townships. Former divisions are indicated in italics.

21 Towns

- Lucheng (鹿城镇) - it was formed from the merger on 27 December 2006 of Chengguan Town (城关镇) and Chengjiao Township. (城郊乡)
- Fangji (方集镇)
- Zhonggang (中岗镇)
- Caoji (曹集镇)
- Tianji (田集镇)
- Chaiji (柴集镇)
- Zhaoji (赵集镇)
- Miaoji (苗集镇)
- Huanggang (黄岗镇)
- Xincun (新村镇)
- Zhuzhai (朱寨镇)
- Zhangzhai (张寨镇)
- Jiaobei (焦陂镇) - renamed from Jiaopo (焦坡镇).
- Wanghua (王化镇)
- Wangshi (王石镇) - renamed from Wangyan (王堰镇).
- Dicheng (地城镇)
- Wangjiaba (王家坝镇)
- Hongheqiao (洪河桥镇)
- Santa (三塔镇) - renamed from Santaji (三塔集镇).
- Liugou (柳沟镇)
- Huilong (会龙镇) - it is upgraded from township.
- Yuanji (袁集镇) - it was merged to Yingzhou District's administration on 10 October 2006.

8 Townships

- Wangdianzi (王店孜乡)
- Gongqiao (公桥乡)
- Gaotai (郜台乡)
- Xutang (许堂乡)
- Longwang (龙王乡)
- Duanying (段郢乡)
- Yuji (于集乡)
- Laoguan (老观乡)

== Climate ==
Climate data for Funan, elevation 31 m (102 ft), (1991–2020 normals, extremes 1981–present)
Month	Jan	Feb	Mar	Apr	May	Jun	Jul	Aug	Sep	Oct	Nov	Dec	Year
Record high °C (°F)	20.7 (69.3)	28.3 (82.9)	33.5 (92.3)	33.0 (91.4)	37.5 (99.5)	39.6 (103.3)	40.7 (105.3)	38.3 (100.9)	38.7 (101.7)	34.1 (93.4)	29.3 (84.7)	23.0 (73.4)	40.7 (105.3)
Mean daily maximum °C (°F)	6.7 (44.1)	10.1 (50.2)	15.4 (59.7)	21.8 (71.2)	27.0 (80.6)	30.5 (86.9)	32.2 (90.0)	31.2 (88.2)	27.6 (81.7)	22.6 (72.7)	15.8 (60.4)	9.2 (48.6)	20.8 (69.5)
Daily mean °C (°F)	2.1 (35.8)	5.0 (41.0)	10.0 (50.0)	16.1 (61.0)	21.4 (70.5)	25.5 (77.9)	27.8 (82.0)	26.8 (80.2)	22.4 (72.3)	16.9 (62.4)	10.3 (50.5)	4.3 (39.7)	15.7 (60.3)
Mean daily minimum °C (°F)	−1.5 (29.3)	1.1 (34.0)	5.5 (41.9)	11.0 (51.8)	16.4 (61.5)	21.2 (70.2)	24.3 (75.7)	23.4 (74.1)	18.5 (65.3)	12.6 (54.7)	6.0 (42.8)	0.5 (32.9)	11.6 (52.9)
Record low °C (°F)	−16.2 (2.8)	−14.5 (5.9)	−3.7 (25.3)	0.0 (32.0)	5.5 (41.9)	12.0 (53.6)	18.2 (64.8)	15.1 (59.2)	9.7 (49.5)	0.1 (32.2)	−6.6 (20.1)	−15.8 (3.6)	−16.2 (2.8)
Average precipitation mm (inches)	28.6 (1.13)	34.1 (1.34)	56.7 (2.23)	63.3 (2.49)	90.8 (3.57)	170.3 (6.70)	209.1 (8.23)	122.5 (4.82)	68.0 (2.68)	58.5 (2.30)	44.3 (1.74)	23.2 (0.91)	969.4 (38.14)
Average precipitation days (≥ 0.1 mm)	6.6	7.6	8.2	8.4	9.8	9.5	11.3	11.3	8.6	7.9	7.6	5.9	102.7
Average snowy days	4.6	2.8	1.2	0	0	0	0	0	0	0	0.6	1.6	10.8
Average relative humidity (%)	74	74	72	73	75	76	83	85	81	75	74	72	76
Mean monthly sunshine hours	131.2	130.8	167.3	196.1	203.0	191.6	200.4	186.9	160.6	162.2	153.7	143.0	2,026.8
Percentage possible sunshine	41	42	45	50	47	45	46	46	44	47	49	46	46
Source: China Meteorological Administration all-time January high
