= Xincun, Anhui =

Coordinates: 32.8632°N 115.515°E

Xincun
- Town

Chinese transcription(s)
  - Chinese: 新村镇
  - Pinyin: Xïncūn Zhèn
- Interactive map of Xincun
- Country: China
- Province: Anhui
- Prefecture: Fuyang
- County: Funan
- Time zone: UTC+8 (China Standard Time)

Xincun is a township-level division situated in Funan County, Fuyang, Anhui, China.

== See also ==
- List of township-level divisions of Anhui
