= Yingdong District =

Yingdong 颍东区
- District
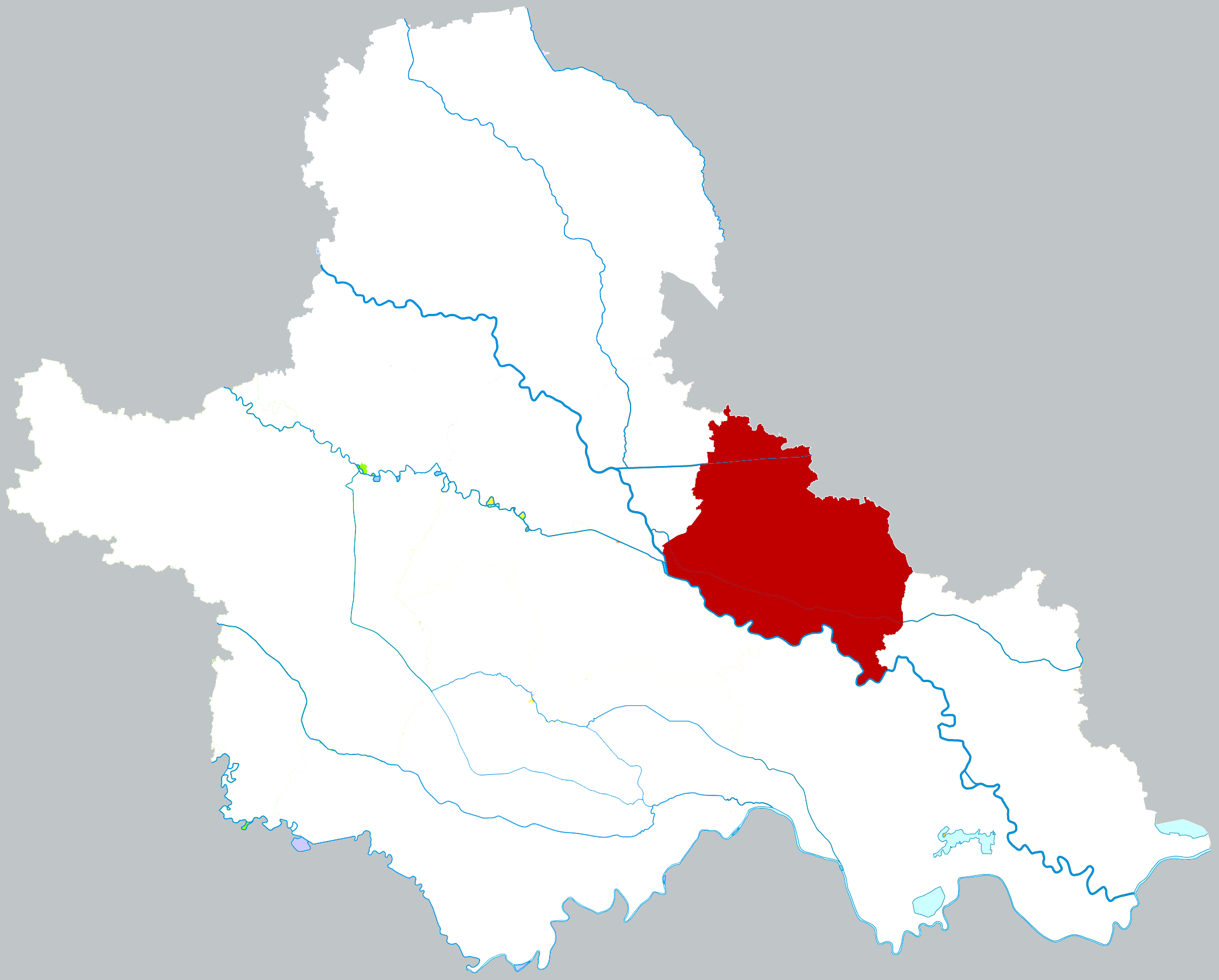
- Location of Yingdong in Fuyang
- Coordinates: 32°54′43″N 115°51′25″E
- Country: People's Republic of China
- Province: Anhui
- Prefecture-level city: Fuyang

Area
  - Total: 685 km^{2} (264 sq mi)

Population (2018)
  - Total: 666,559
- Time zone: UTC+8 (China Standard)
- Postal code: 236000

Yingdong District (simplified Chinese: 颍东区; traditional Chinese: 潁東區; pinyin: Yǐngdōng Qū) is a district of the city of Fuyang, Anhui Province, China.

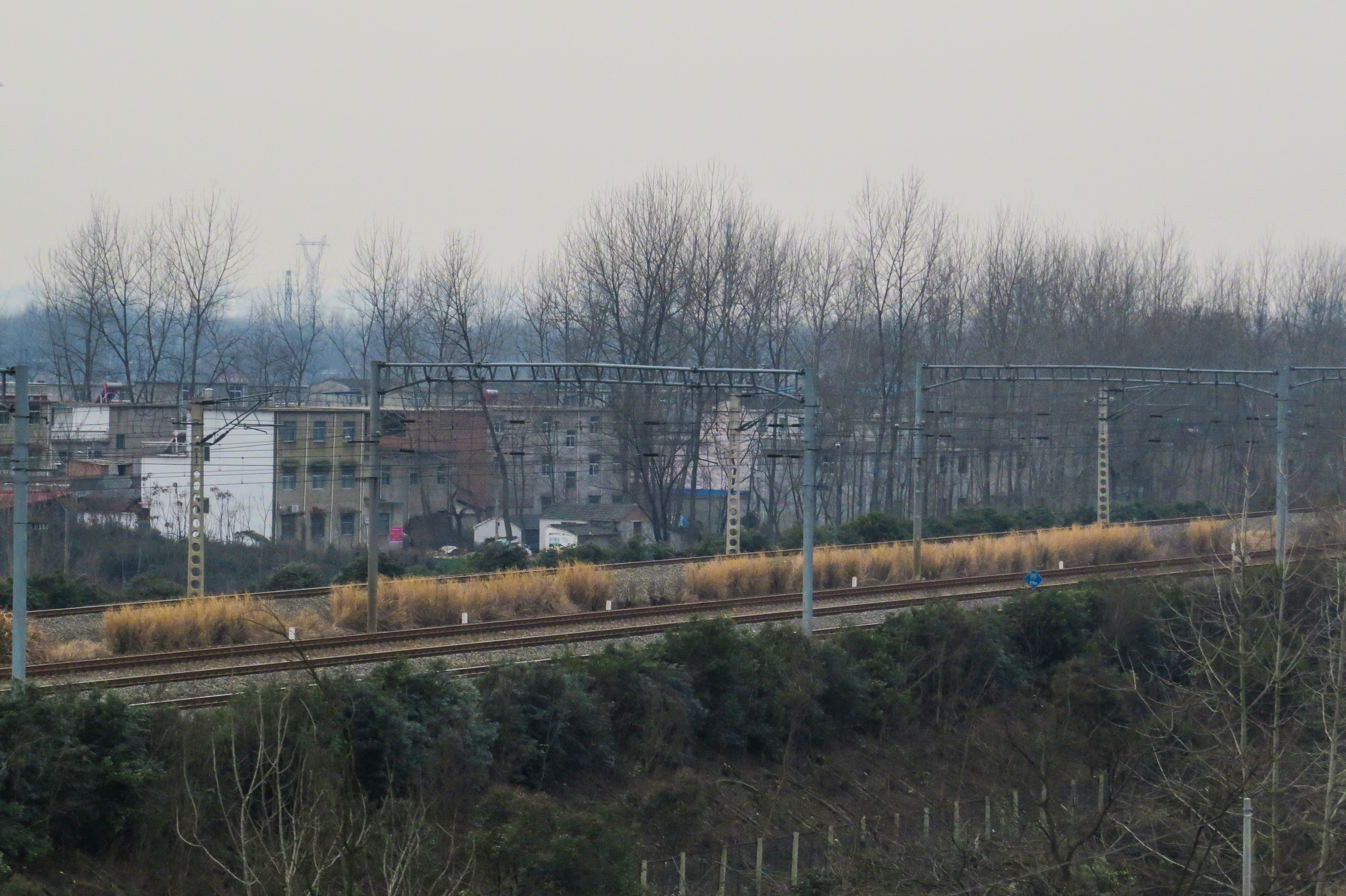
Fuyang-Huainan Railway under G35 Taken in Yingdong District.

== Administrative divisions ==
In the present, Yingdong District has 3 subdistricts, 7 towns and 2 townships.

3 subdistricts

- Xinhua (新华街道)
- Xiangyang (向阳街道)
- Hedong (河东街道)

7 towns

- Kouzi (口孜镇)
- Laomiao (老庙镇)
- Zhengwu (正午镇)
- Chahua (插花镇)
- Yuanzhai (袁寨镇)
- Xinwujiang (新乌江镇)
- Ranmiao (冉庙镇)

2 townships

- Zaozhuang (枣庄乡)
- Yanglouzi (杨楼孜乡)
