= Yingshang County =

Yingshang 颍上县
- County
- Interactive map of Yingshang
- Coordinates: 32°39′11″N 116°15′25″E
- Country: People's Republic of China
- Province: Anhui
- Prefecture-level city: Fuyang

Area
  - Total: 1,859 km^{2} (718 sq mi)

Population (2019)
  - Total: 1,295,000
  - Density: 696.6/km^{2} (1,804/sq mi)
- Time zone: UTC+8 (China Standard)
- Postal Code: 236200

Yingshang County (simplified Chinese: 颍上县; traditional Chinese: 潁上縣; pinyin: Yǐngshàng Xiàn) is a county in the northwest of Anhui province, China. It is under the jurisdiction of the prefecture-level city of Fuyang. The Huai River, which frequently floods, forms part of the county's southern border.

Yingshang is an agricultural county with wheat and rice as the main crops, and a million tons of food produced each year from 2007 to 2016.

The county has proven iron ore reserves registering in the hundreds of millions of tons. Coal reserves are estimated at 100 million tons.

== Community facilities ==
- Bali River Scenic Area

== Administrative divisions ==
At present, Yingshang County has 21 towns, 7 townships and 1 ethnic township.

21 towns

- Shencheng (慎城镇)
- Xieqiao (谢桥镇)
- Nanzhao (南照镇)
- Yanghu (杨湖镇)
- Liushipu (六十铺镇)
- Jiangkou (江口镇)
- Runhe (润河镇)
- Xinji (新集镇)
- Gengpeng (耿棚镇)
- Bangang (半岗镇)
- Wanggang (王岗镇)
- Xiaqiao (夏桥镇)
- Chenqiao (陈桥镇)
- Huangqiao (黄桥镇)
- Jiangdianzi (江店孜镇)
- Digou (迪沟镇)
- Balihe (八里河镇)
- Xisanshipu (西三十铺镇)
- Shibalipu (十八里铺镇)
- Lukou (鲁口镇)
- Hongxin (红心镇)

7 townships

- Jianyi (建颍乡)
- Shengtang (盛堂乡)
- Liuji (刘集乡)
- Gucheng (古城乡)
- Huangba (黄坝乡)
- Wushipu (五十铺乡)
- Guantun (关屯乡)

1 ethnic townships

- Hui Saijian Township (赛涧回族乡)

== Climate ==
Climate data for Yingshang, elevation 27 m (89 ft), (1991–2020 normals, extremes 1981–present)
| Month | Jan | Feb | Mar | Apr | May | Jun | Jul | Aug | Sep | Oct | Nov | Dec | Year |
|---|---|---|---|---|---|---|---|---|---|---|---|---|---|
| Record high °C (°F) | 20.4 (68.7) | 27.5 (81.5) | 35.4 (95.7) | 33.0 (91.4) | 36.5 (97.7) | 38.4 (101.1) | 40.2 (104.4) | 38.1 (100.6) | 37.2 (99.0) | 34.1 (93.4) | 29.2 (84.6) | 22.5 (72.5) | 40.2 (104.4) |
| Mean daily maximum °C (°F) | 6.8 (44.2) | 10.0 (50.0) | 15.3 (59.5) | 21.8 (71.2) | 27.0 (80.6) | 30.2 (86.4) | 31.9 (89.4) | 31.2 (88.2) | 27.4 (81.3) | 22.5 (72.5) | 15.8 (60.4) | 9.2 (48.6) | 20.8 (69.4) |
| Daily mean °C (°F) | 2.1 (35.8) | 5.0 (41.0) | 9.9 (49.8) | 16.1 (61.0) | 21.5 (70.7) | 25.5 (77.9) | 28.0 (82.4) | 27.1 (80.8) | 22.7 (72.9) | 17.1 (62.8) | 10.4 (50.7) | 4.2 (39.6) | 15.8 (60.5) |
| Mean daily minimum °C (°F) | −1.3 (29.7) | 1.1 (34.0) | 5.5 (41.9) | 11.1 (52.0) | 16.6 (61.9) | 21.5 (70.7) | 24.7 (76.5) | 23.9 (75.0) | 19.0 (66.2) | 12.9 (55.2) | 6.2 (43.2) | 0.6 (33.1) | 11.8 (53.3) |
| Record low °C (°F) | −16.8 (1.8) | −16.6 (2.1) | −4.9 (23.2) | −0.6 (30.9) | 6.0 (42.8) | 12.8 (55.0) | 18.3 (64.9) | 15.1 (59.2) | 9.2 (48.6) | 0.9 (33.6) | −9.6 (14.7) | −15.6 (3.9) | −16.8 (1.8) |
| Average precipitation mm (inches) | 33.4 (1.31) | 38.2 (1.50) | 59.4 (2.34) | 62.5 (2.46) | 84.0 (3.31) | 167.4 (6.59) | 220.3 (8.67) | 124.6 (4.91) | 68.9 (2.71) | 53.7 (2.11) | 44.9 (1.77) | 24.3 (0.96) | 981.6 (38.64) |
| Average precipitation days (≥ 0.1 mm) | 6.6 | 7.9 | 8.7 | 7.9 | 9.5 | 9.9 | 12.3 | 11.3 | 8.6 | 7.8 | 7.7 | 5.9 | 104.1 |
| Average snowy days | 4.1 | 2.4 | 1.1 | 0 | 0 | 0 | 0 | 0 | 0 | 0 | 0.6 | 1.5 | 9.7 |
| Average relative humidity (%) | 73 | 73 | 71 | 72 | 72 | 75 | 83 | 84 | 80 | 74 | 74 | 73 | 75 |
| Mean monthly sunshine hours | 118.6 | 120.9 | 156.8 | 184.6 | 193.7 | 170.6 | 189.6 | 183.5 | 156.4 | 156.2 | 144.1 | 132.8 | 1,907.8 |
| Percentage possible sunshine | 37 | 39 | 42 | 47 | 45 | 40 | 44 | 45 | 43 | 45 | 46 | 43 | 43 |
Source: China Meteorological Administration
