= Fuyang Normal University =

University in Fuyang, China

Coordinates: 32.8923°N 115.7798°E

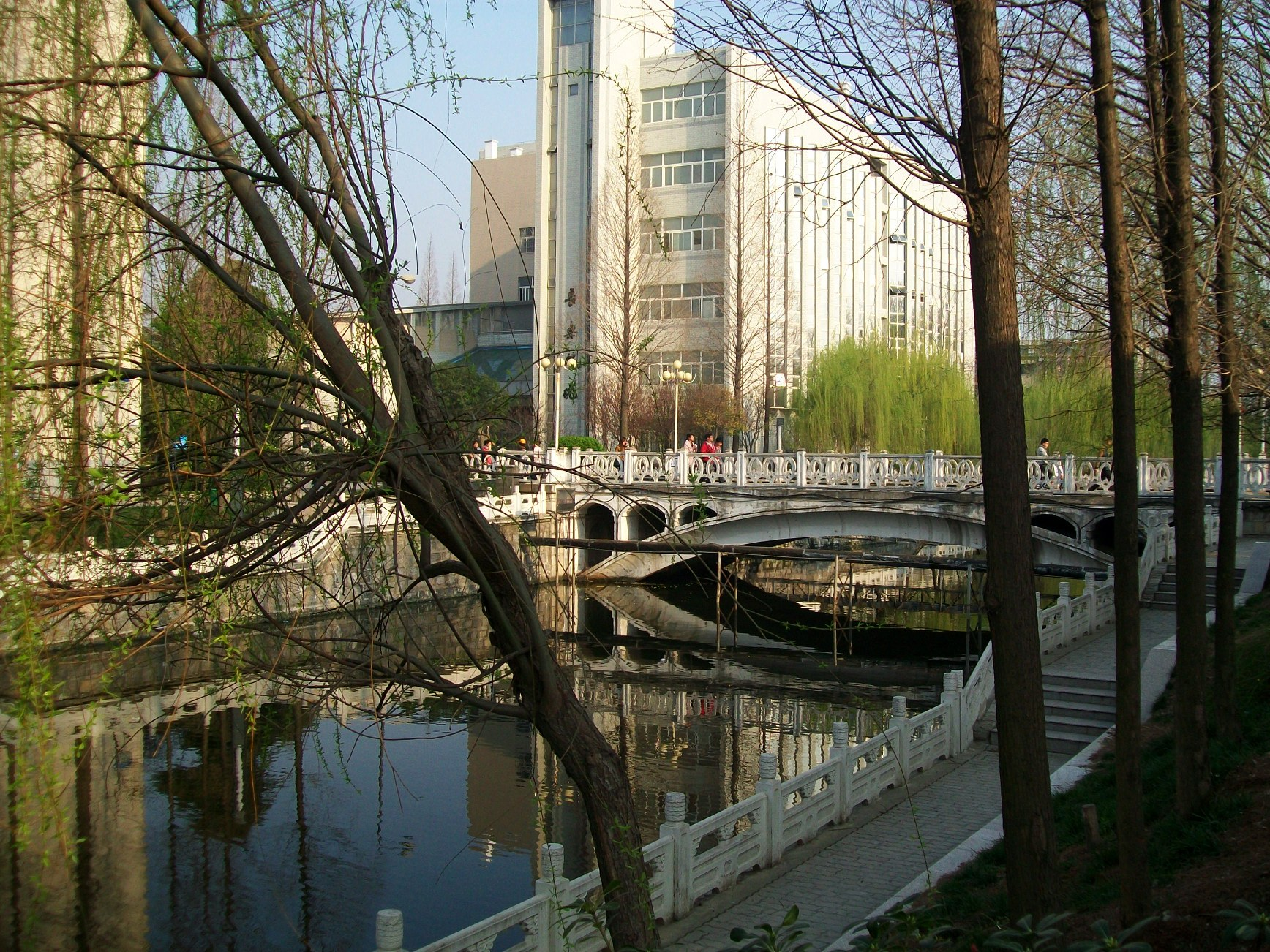
Fuyang Normal University east campus

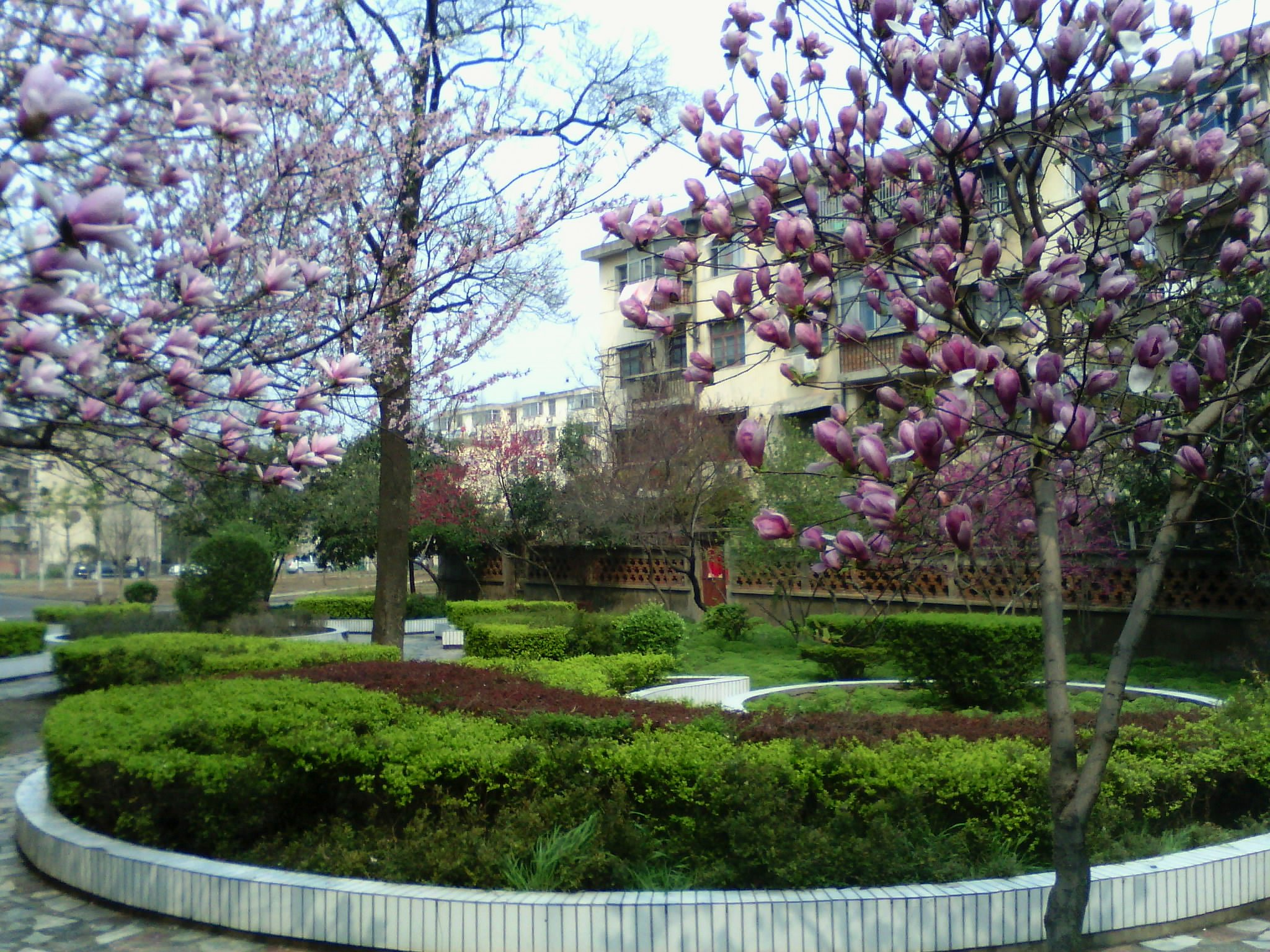
Fuyang Normal University east campus

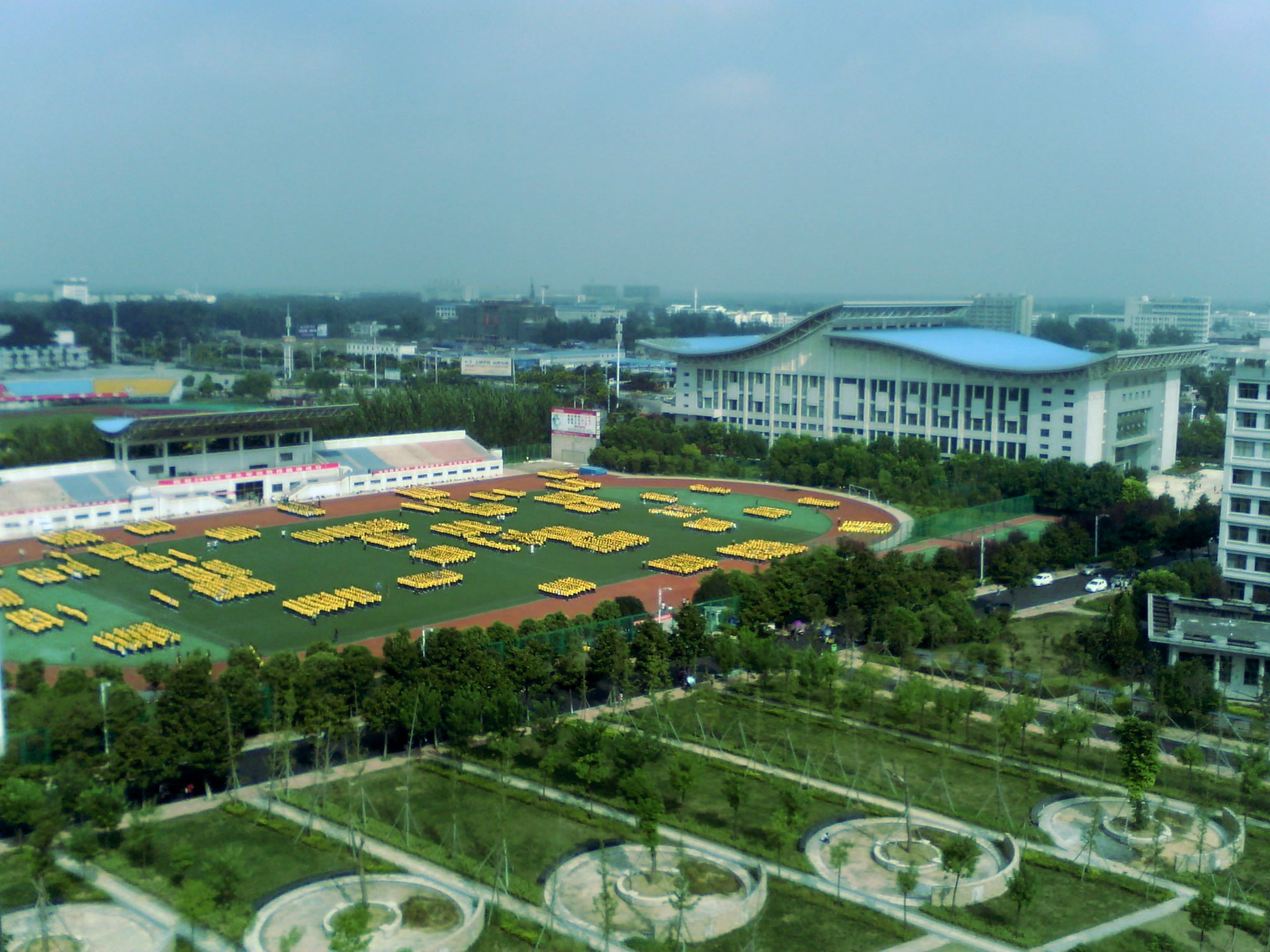
Freshman military training at the west campus

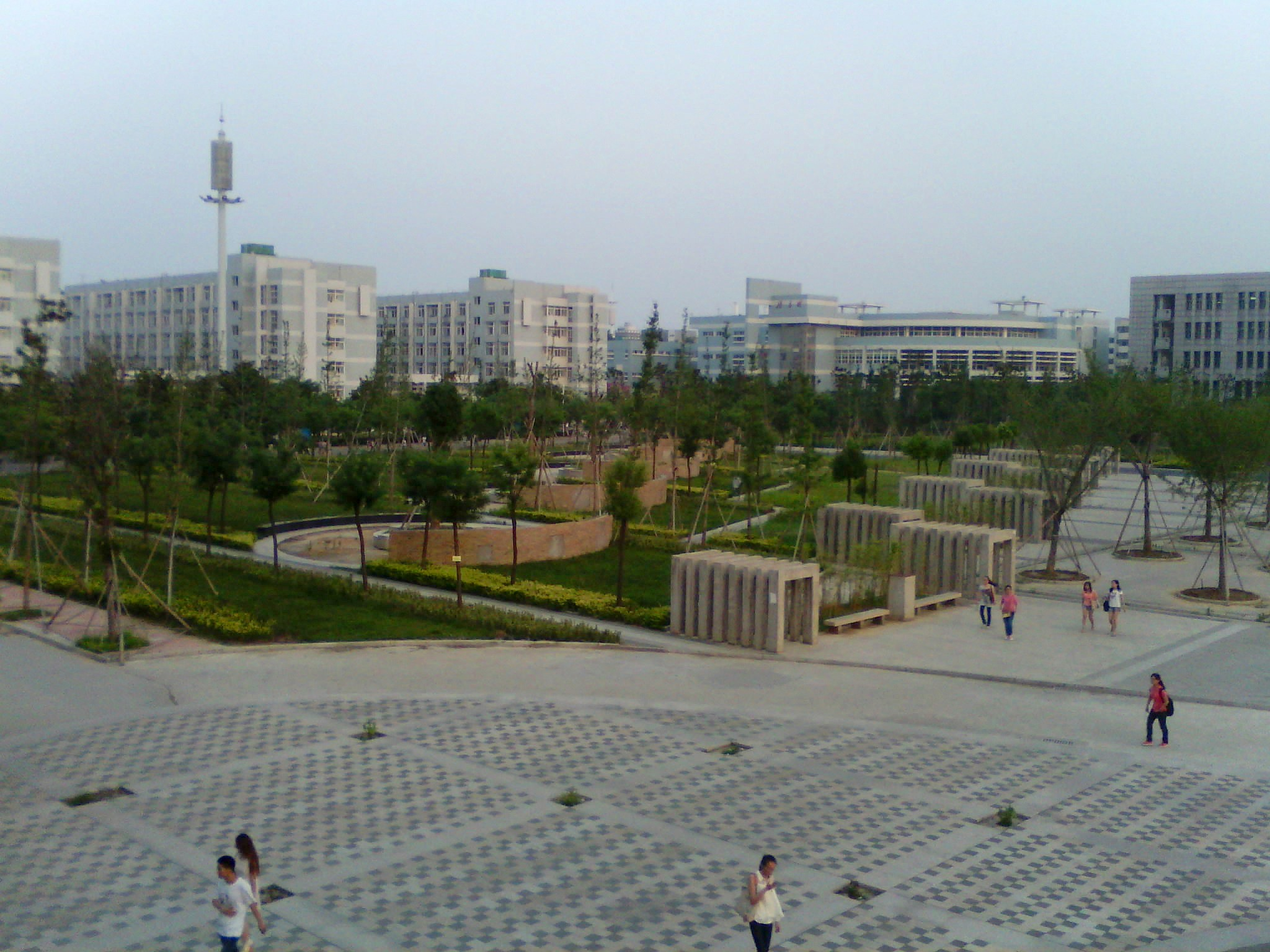
Fuyang Normal University west campus

Fuyang Normal University (simplified Chinese: 阜阳师范大学; pinyin: Fùyáng Shīfàn Dàxué), previously known as Fuyang Teachers College, is an institution of higher learning in Fuyang city, Anhui province, China. It is the largest institution of higher learning in the city of Fuyang.

== History ==
=== Founding and early history ===
The college developed on the basis of "Anhui Normal University", Fuyang Campus. Its predecessors are "Teachers School of Fuyang Region of Anhui Province", "Fuyang High School Teachers Training School" and "Fuyang High School Teachers Express Class".

In 1957, "Fuyang High School Teachers Express Class" was founded, comprising two-year programs of Chinese literature and mathematics, and one-year programs of physics, chemistry and geography. In the fall of 1957, the Express Class was renamed "Fuyang High School Teachers Training School", and the subjects of Chinese literature and mathematics merged into "Hefei Normal School". The remaining one-year programs were transformed into Physics and Chemistry Department and History and Geography Department, and were planned to be extended one more year. However, due to the "Anti-rightists campaign", those students were sent to work in the winter break of 1958.

In September 1958, the Training School became "Fuyang Regional Teachers School of Anhui Province". Zhang Jianhua (张剑华), the then vice director of Fuyang Administrative Region, served as the president, and Wang Gancheng (王干臣) as vice president and Party chief. It consisted of departments of Chinese literature, maths, physics, chemistry, biology, history and geography, all being two-year programs. It launched an additional politics express class in 1960, and recruited two preparatory classes from junior high graduates, all of whom were transferred to Fuyang Normal School in 1962.

In spring of 1962, the school became "Fuyang High School Teachers Training School", and the main purpose was to train high school teachers. The enrollment began in the fall of that year, and subjects included Chinese literature, maths, foreign language, biochemistry and politics. In summer of 1963, the students graduated prematurely, and most of them were assigned to teach in primary schools. A few of them continued their training in the Teachers Training School of Liu'an High School, and Provincial Education Institute. The enrollment was discontinued in the fall of 1964, and the school was transformed to host a two-month training program for high school administrative staff and eminent teachers, and a three-month program for teachers of agricultural high schools. Tang Zhaohua served as the president and party chief. It recruited 284 from teachers in agricultural schools in 1965, and had two one-year programs, literature and maths. However, due to the outbreak of Cultural Revolution, their graduation had been postponed till 1968.

=== Cultural Revolution ===
During Cultural Revolution, the whole school was ordered to relocate to rural area, and in Linquan County, two high schools were formed in Tanpeng Commune and Gaotang Commune, respectively. At that time, there were totally 99 instructors and staff. Besides 33 workers, the rest had all been sent to the countryside. The school suffered great losses in school buildings, teaching tools, documents and books, and equipment.

=== Recovery and renaming ===
China's education section began partially recovery in 1974. On the original site of the Training School founded the "Anhui Normal University", Fuyang Campus, which was jointly administered by provincial and regional government. Tang Zhaohua again served as the head, called chairman of school's revolutionary committee. It had five departments, literature, maths, foreign language, physics and chemistry, and fine art, consisting six majors. In addition, there were a Marxism–Leninism teaching office and a sports teaching office, responsible for school-wide public politics and physical education.

At the end of 1978, approved by the State Council, the Fuyang Campus was expanded and renamed "Fuyang Teachers College". On September 1, 1979, the college party committee was officially formed, and on September 20, the founding ceremony was held for Fuyang Teachers College, and September 20 was also named college's founding day.

== Campuses ==
Fuyang Teachers College contains three campuses. The Qinghe Campus (清河校区), also known as the East Campus, is the original campus. The West Lake Campus (西湖校区), also known as the West Campus, is a larger campus built in recent years. The Sanliqiao Campus (三里桥校区).

== Students and faculty ==
In total, Fuyang Normal University has over 21,000 students and more than 1100 full-time teachers.
