= Yingquan District =

Coordinates: 32°55′30″N 115°50′02″E

Yingquan 颍泉区
- District
- Interactive map of Yingquan
- Country: People's Republic of China
- Province: Anhui
- Prefecture-level city: Fuyang

Area
  - Total: 648 km^{2} (250 sq mi)

Population (2018)
  - Total: 622,000
- Time zone: UTC+8 (China Standard)
- Postal code: 236000

Yingquan District (simplified Chinese: 颍泉区; traditional Chinese: 潁泉區; pinyin: Yǐngquán Qū) is a district of the city of Fuyang, Anhui Province, China.

== Recent events ==
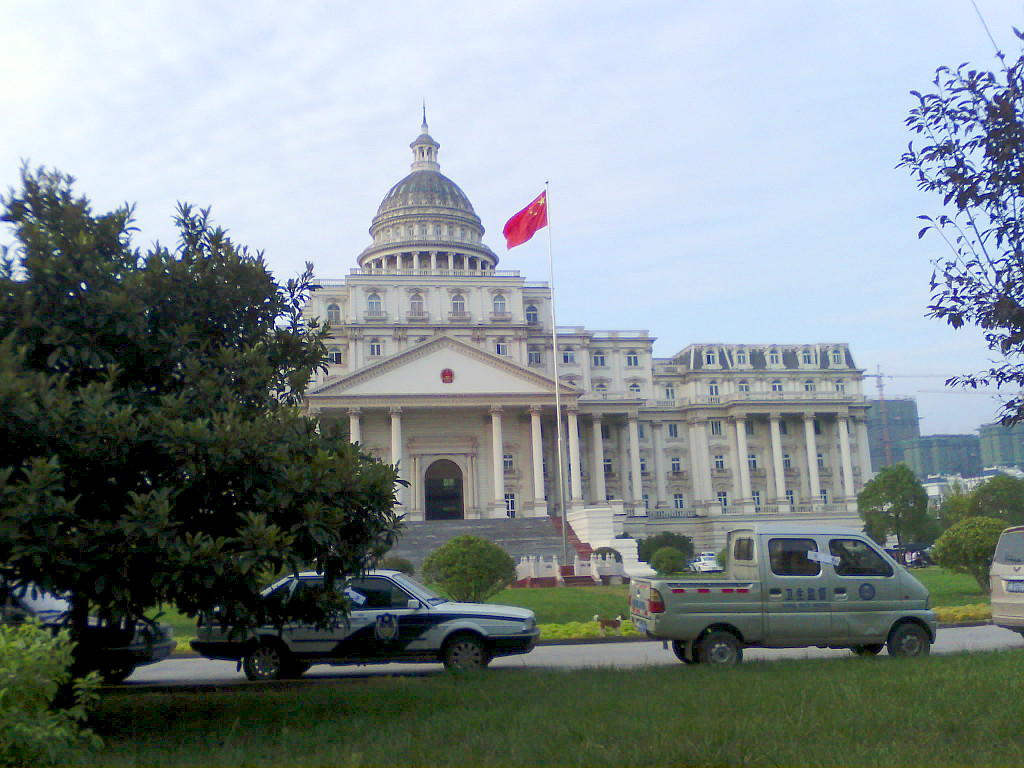
Fuyang's "White House" in Yingquan District

In early 2007, Chinese state media began reporting that in Yingquan District, a government building dubbed the "White House" was becoming controversial. The construction cost of the "White House" was reported to have reached 30 million yuan, nearly one third of the 100 million yuan annual fiscal income of the entire Yingquan district. Despite being popularly deemed the "White House" (白宫), the building resembles the United States Capitol.

In 2008, it was widely reported that Zhang Zhi'an (张治安), the Communist Party chief of Yingquan District, nicknamed the "White House Party Chief," had been suspended from his office on June 5, 2008, along several other officials. They were under investigation for the death of Li Guofu (李国福), a businessman who acted as a whistleblower. In Beijing, Li Guofu had accused Zhang of corruption and abuse of power, and hoped that Yingquan District would reclaim the area as farmland. In August 2007, Li Guofu was arrested by the Yingquan government on corruption charges and imprisoned. Zhang interrogated Li, threatening his family, and extracted a confession from him. On March 13, 2008, just hours before he was scheduled to see a lawyer, Li Guofu was found hanged. Although his death was deemed a suicide, media reported that Li Guofu's body was bruised and his mouth was tightly shut, uncharacteristic of a suicide by hanging. On February 8, 2010, Zhang was found guilty of taking bribes, retaliation, and framing an innocent person, and was sentenced to death with a two-year reprieve.

== Administrative divisions ==
In the present, Yingquan District has 2 subdistricts and 4 towns.

2 subdistricts

- Zhongshi (中市街道)
- Zhoupeng (周棚街道)

4 towns

- Renming (任明镇)
- Ninglaozhuang (宁老庄镇)
- Wenji (闻集镇)
- Hangliu (行流镇)
