= Yingzhou District =

Coordinates: 32°54′08″N 115°49′48″E

Yingzhou 颍州区 Yingchow
- District
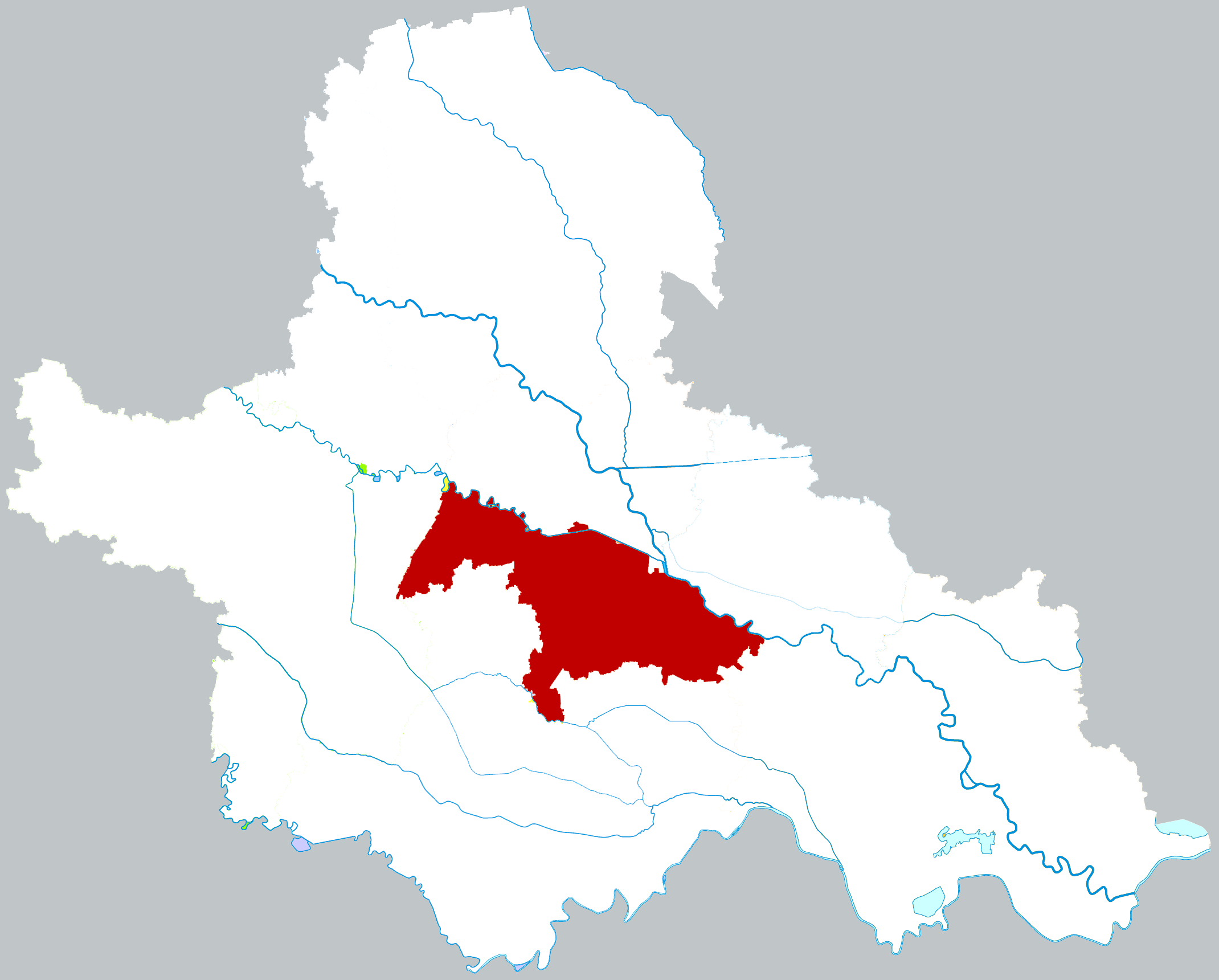
- Location of Yingzhou in Fuyang
- Country: People's Republic of China
- Province: Anhui
- Prefecture-level city: Fuyang

Area
  - Total: 616.3 km^{2} (238.0 sq mi)

Population (2018)
  - Total: 773,000
- Time zone: UTC+8 (China Standard)
- Postal code: 236000

Yingzhou District (simplified Chinese: 颍州区; traditional Chinese: 潁州區; pinyin: Yǐngzhōu Qū) is a district of the city of Fuyang, Anhui Province, China.

== Administrative divisions ==
In the present, Yingzhou District has 4 subdistricts, 7 towns and 1 township.

4 subdistricts

- Yingxi (颍西街道)
- Gulou (鼓楼街道)
- Qinghe (清河街道)
- Wenfeng (文峰街道)

7 towns

- Wangdian (王店镇)
- Chengji (程集镇)
- Xihu (西湖镇)
- Sanhe (三合镇)
- Yuanji (袁集镇)
- Sanshilipu (三十里铺镇)
- Jiulong (九龙镇)

1 townships

- Mazhai (马寨乡)

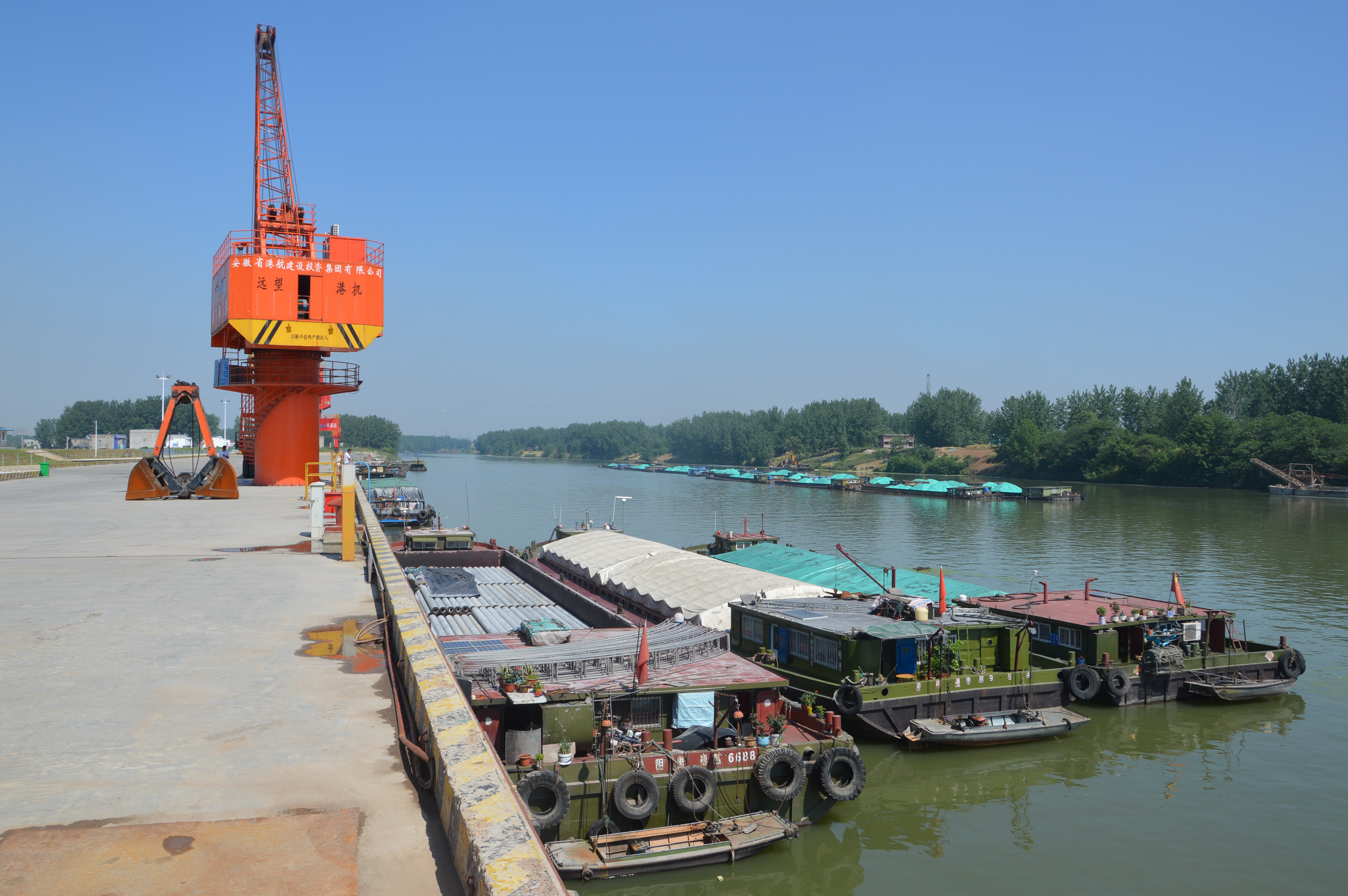
The Yingzhou Port in Yingzhou District
