= Fuyang =

Fuyang 阜阳市 Fowyang
- Prefecture-level city
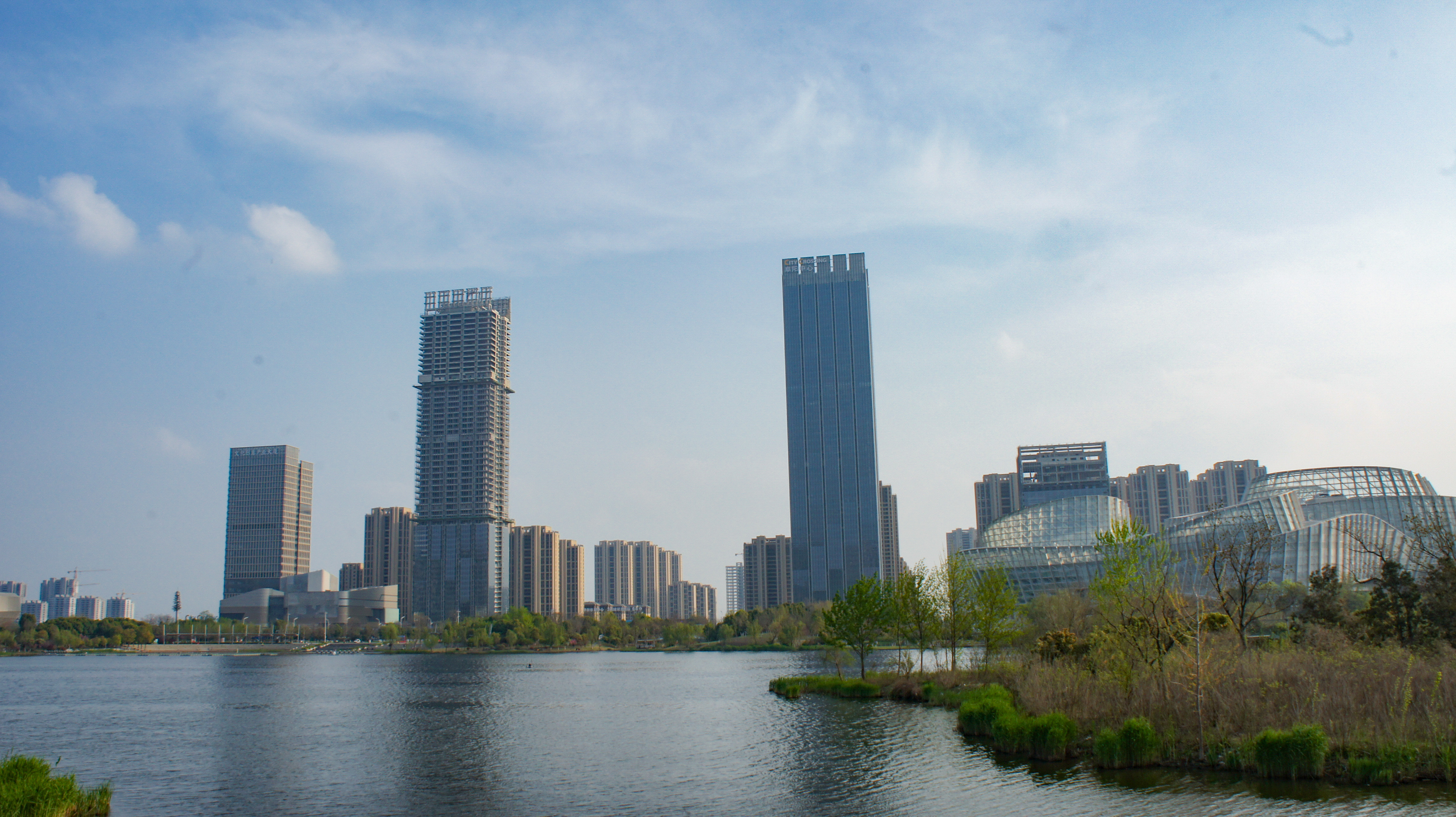
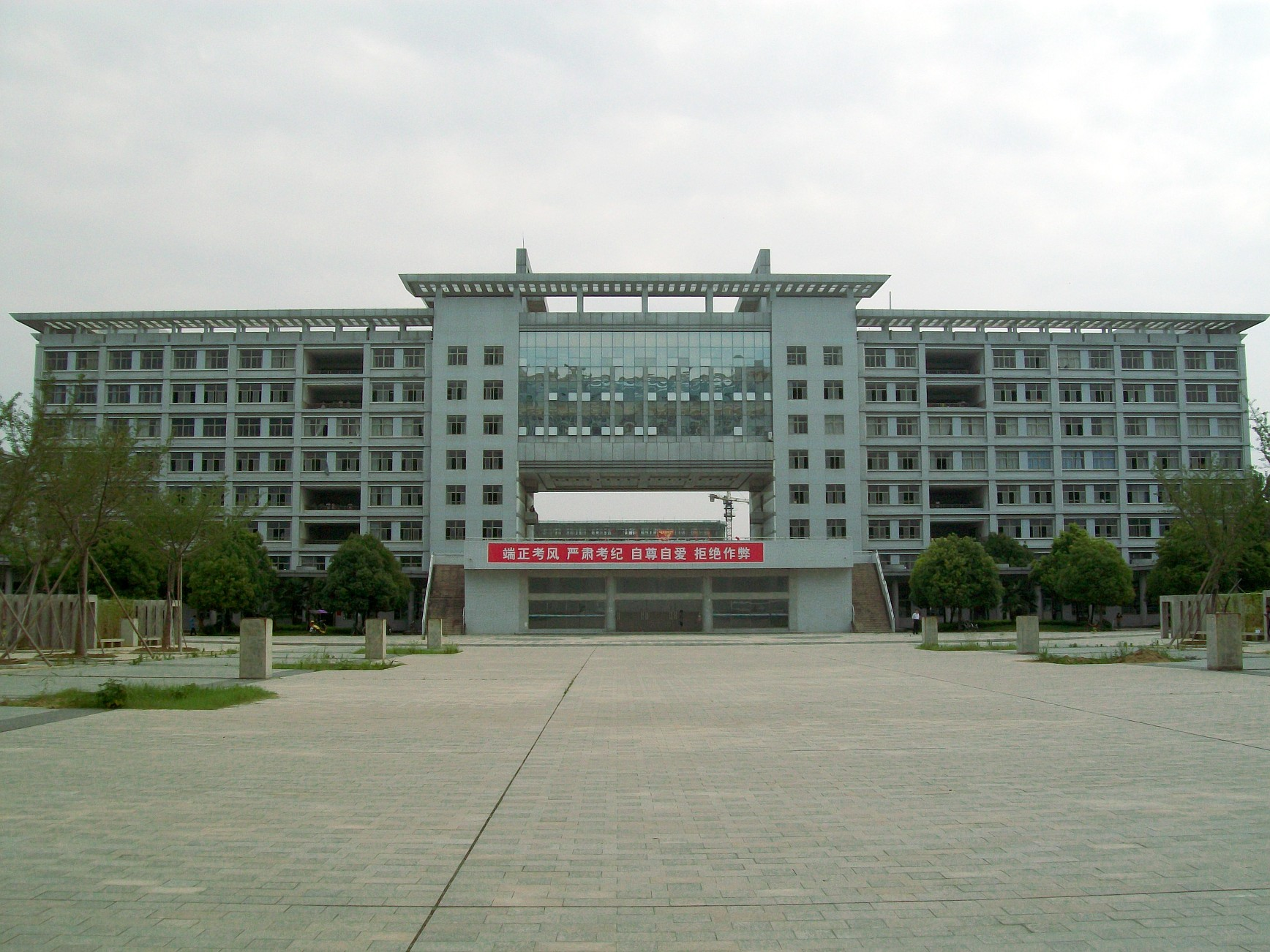
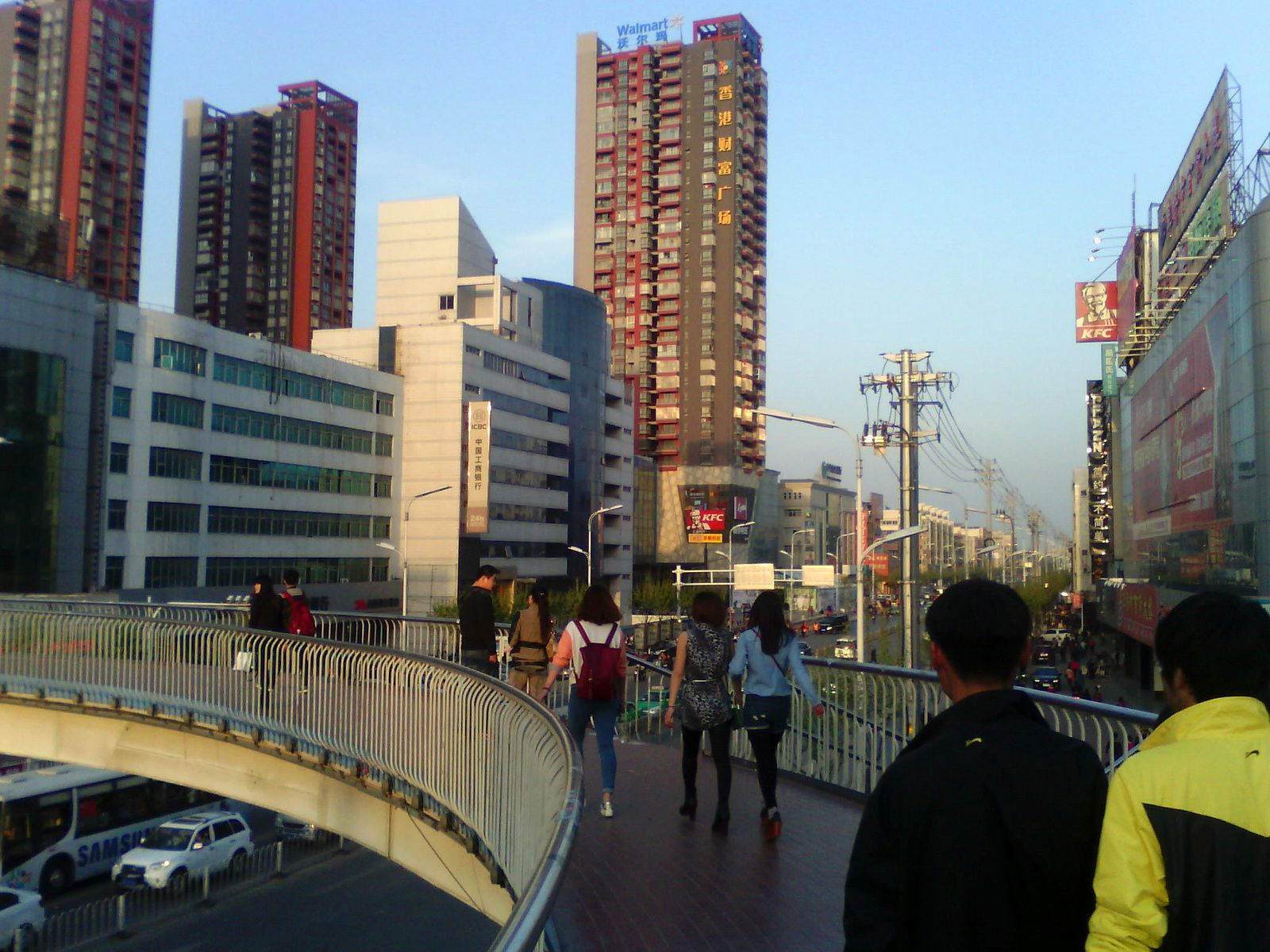
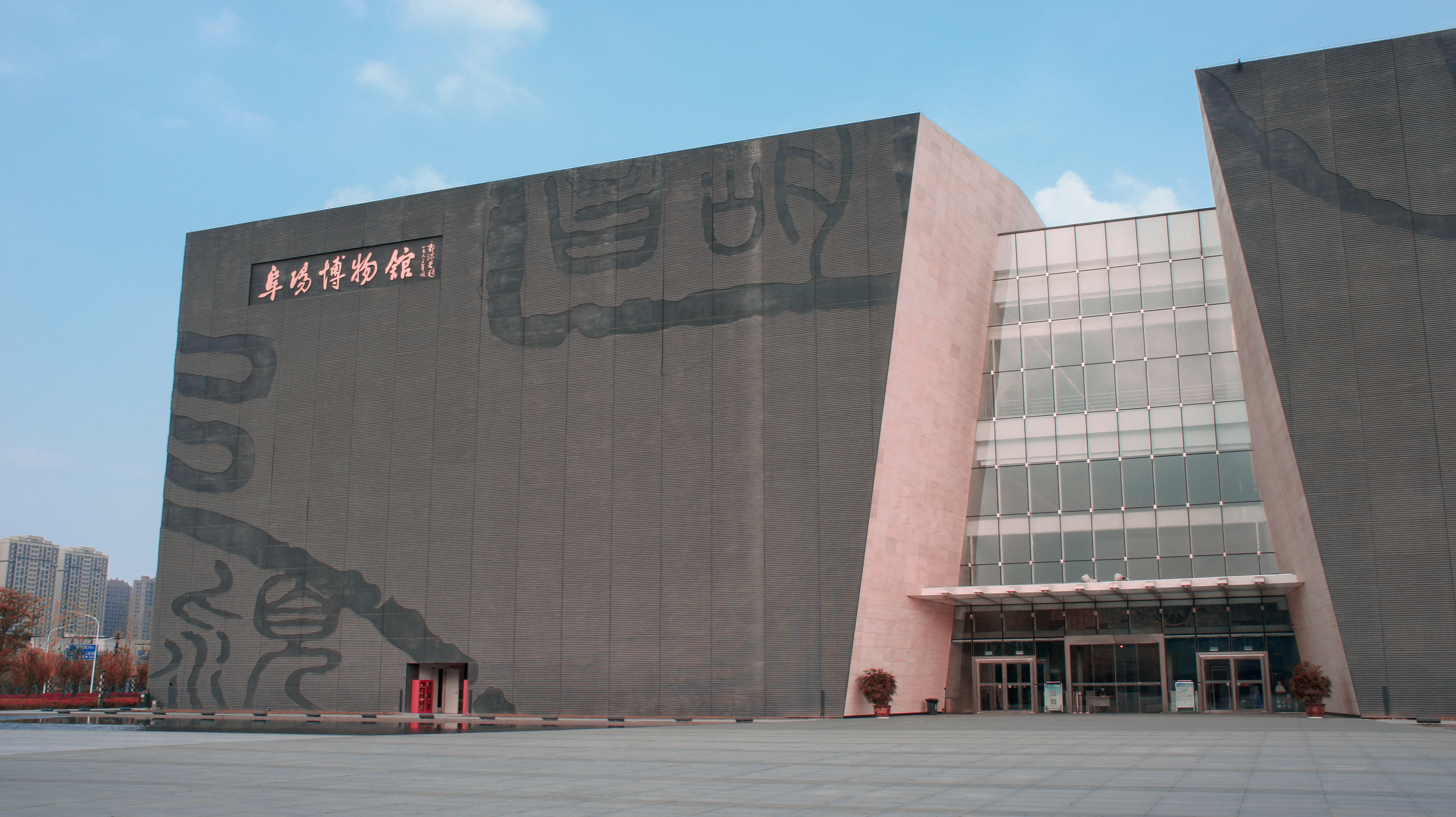
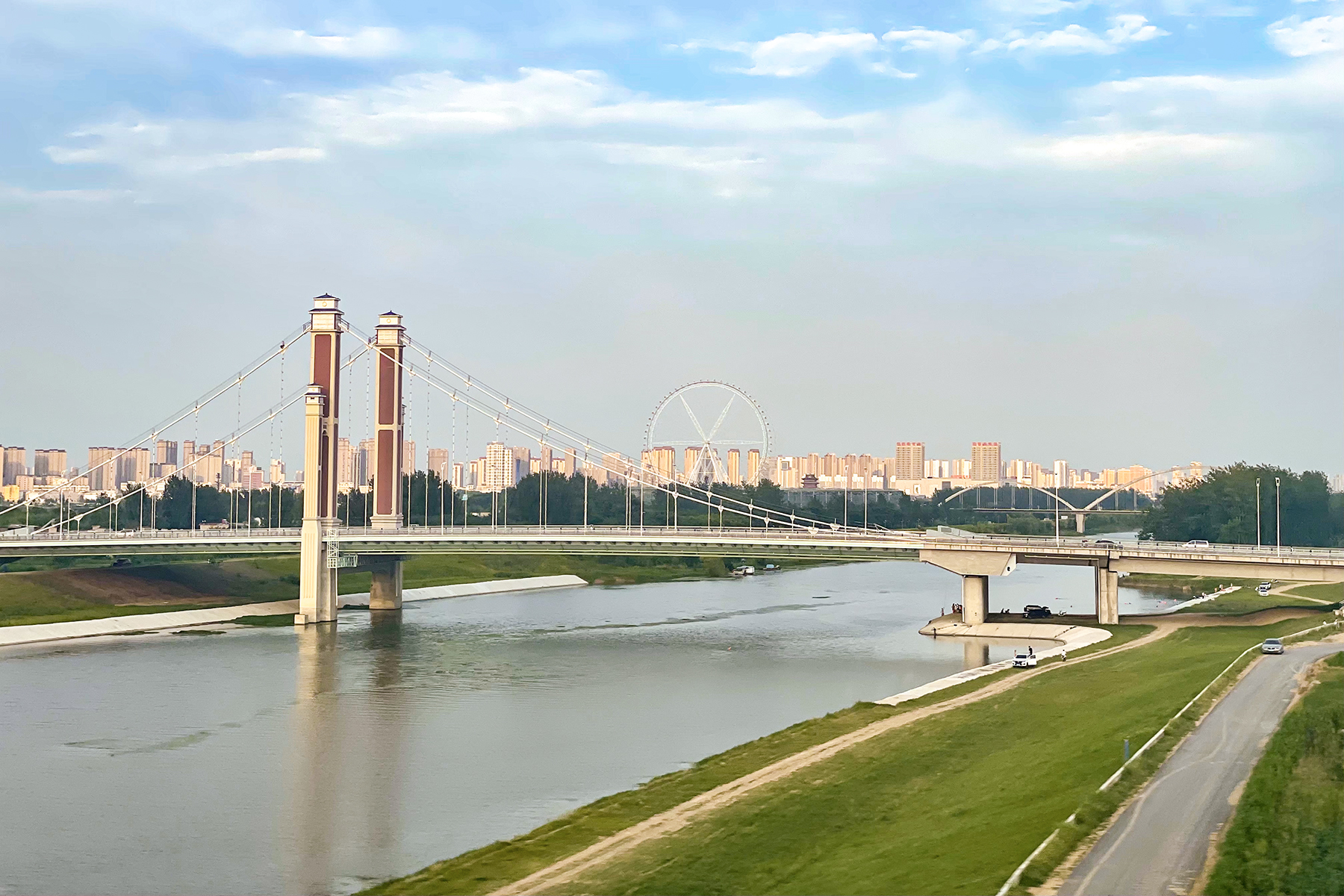
- Clockwise from the top: Huarun Fuyang City Crossing and Fuyang Theater; Downtown Yingquan District; Quan River Bridge; Fuyang Museum; Fuyang Normal University.

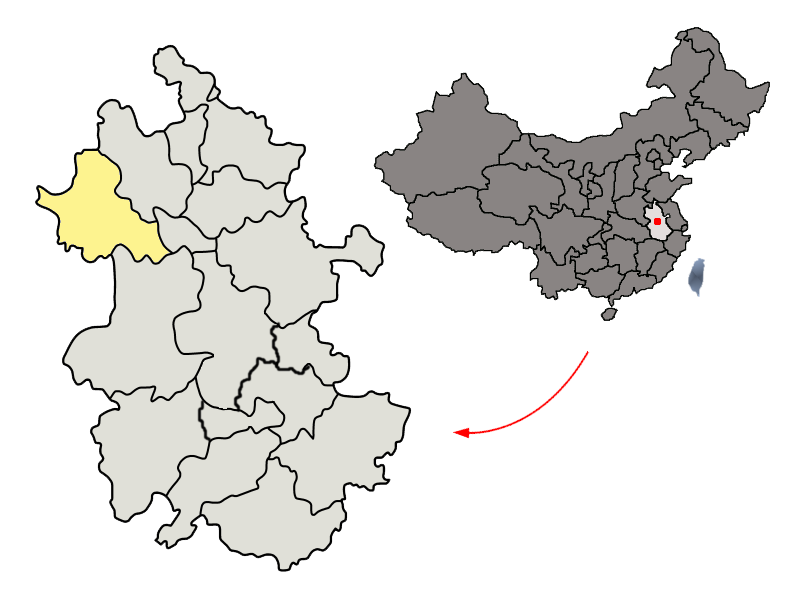
- Coordinates (Fuyang municipal government): 32°53′24″N 115°48′50″E
- Country: People's Republic of China
- Province: Anhui
- County-level divisions: 8
- Municipal seat: Yingzhou District

Government
  - CPC Secretary: Sun Zhengdong (孙正东)
  - Mayor: Liu Yujie (刘玉杰)

Area
  - Prefecture-level city: 9,775 km^{2} (3,774 sq mi)
  - Urban: 1,844 km^{2} (712 sq mi)
  - Metro: 1,844 km^{2} (712 sq mi)

Population (2020 census)
  - Prefecture-level city: 8,200,264
  - Density: 838.9/km^{2} (2,173/sq mi)
  - Urban: 2,128,538
  - Urban density: 1,154/km^{2} (2,990/sq mi)
  - Metro: 2,128,538
  - Metro density: 1,154/km^{2} (2,990/sq mi)

GDP
  - Prefecture-level city: CN¥ 307.2 billion US$ 39.5 billion
  - Per capita: CN¥ 37,591; US$ 5,827
- Time zone: UTC+8 (CST)
- Postal code: 236000
- Area code: 0558
- ISO 3166 code: CN-AH-12
- License Plate Prefix: 皖K

Fuyang (simplified Chinese: 阜阳; traditional Chinese: 阜陽; pinyin: Fùyáng, previously romanized as Fowyang) is a prefecture-level city in northwestern Anhui province, China. It is bordered by Henan province to the west and the cities of Bozhou to the northeast, Huainan to the southeast, and Lu'an to the south.

Its population was 8,200,264 inhabitants at the 2020 census whom 2,128,538 lived in the built-up (or metro) area made of 3 urban districts Yingzhou, Yingdong and Yingquan.

== History ==
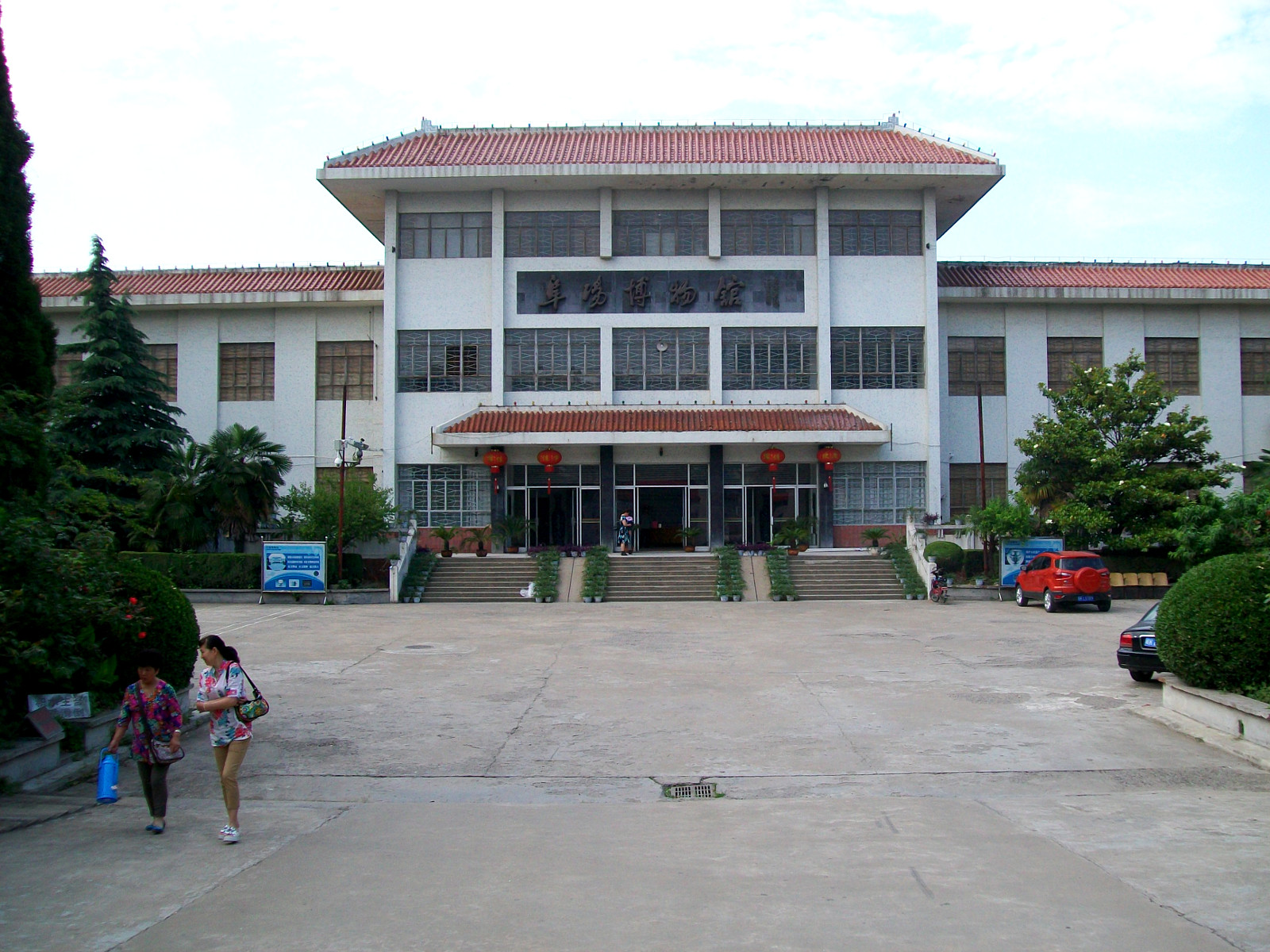
Fuyang city museum

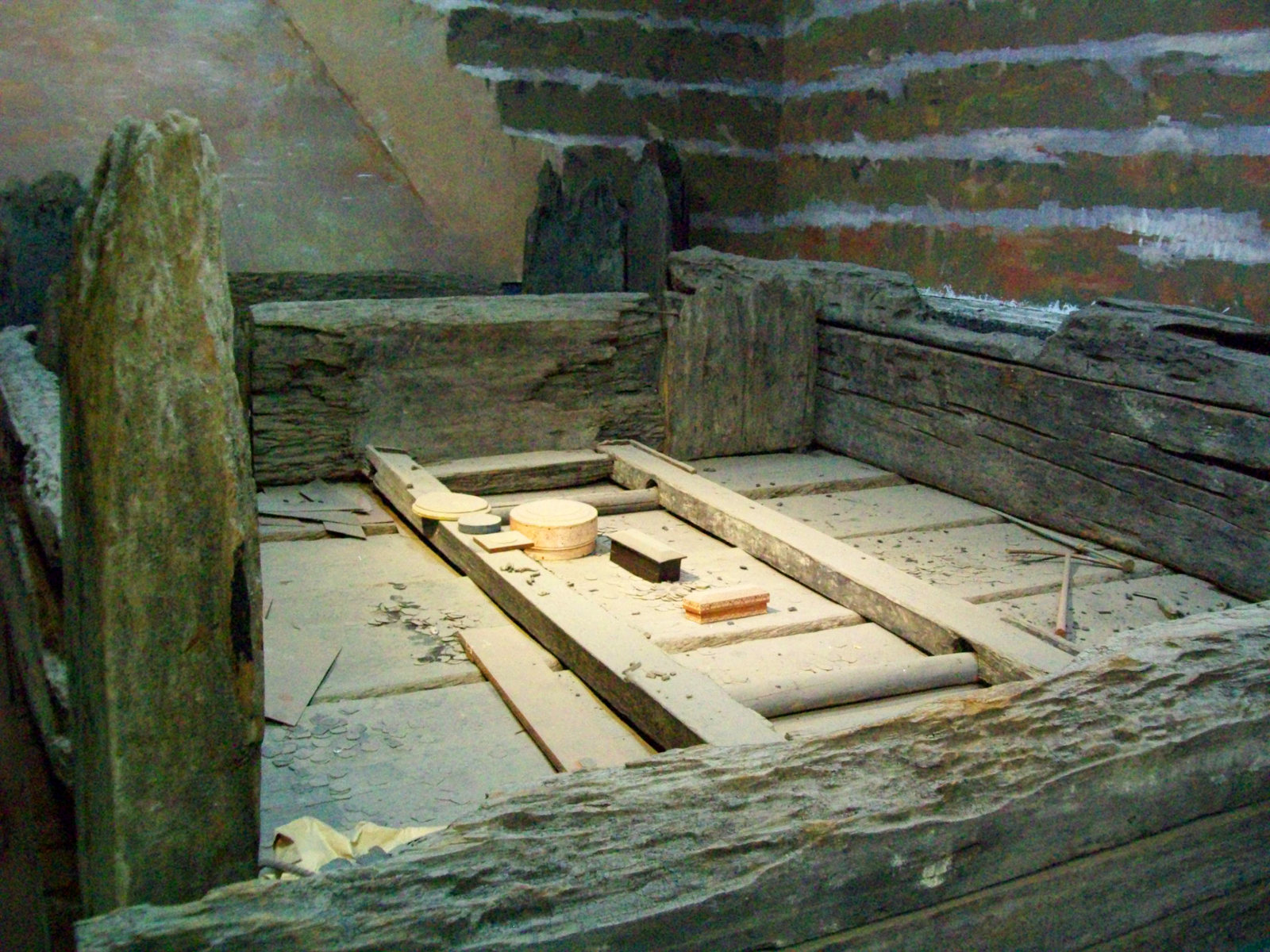
Tomb of Xiahou Zao (front), now located in Fuyang's local museum

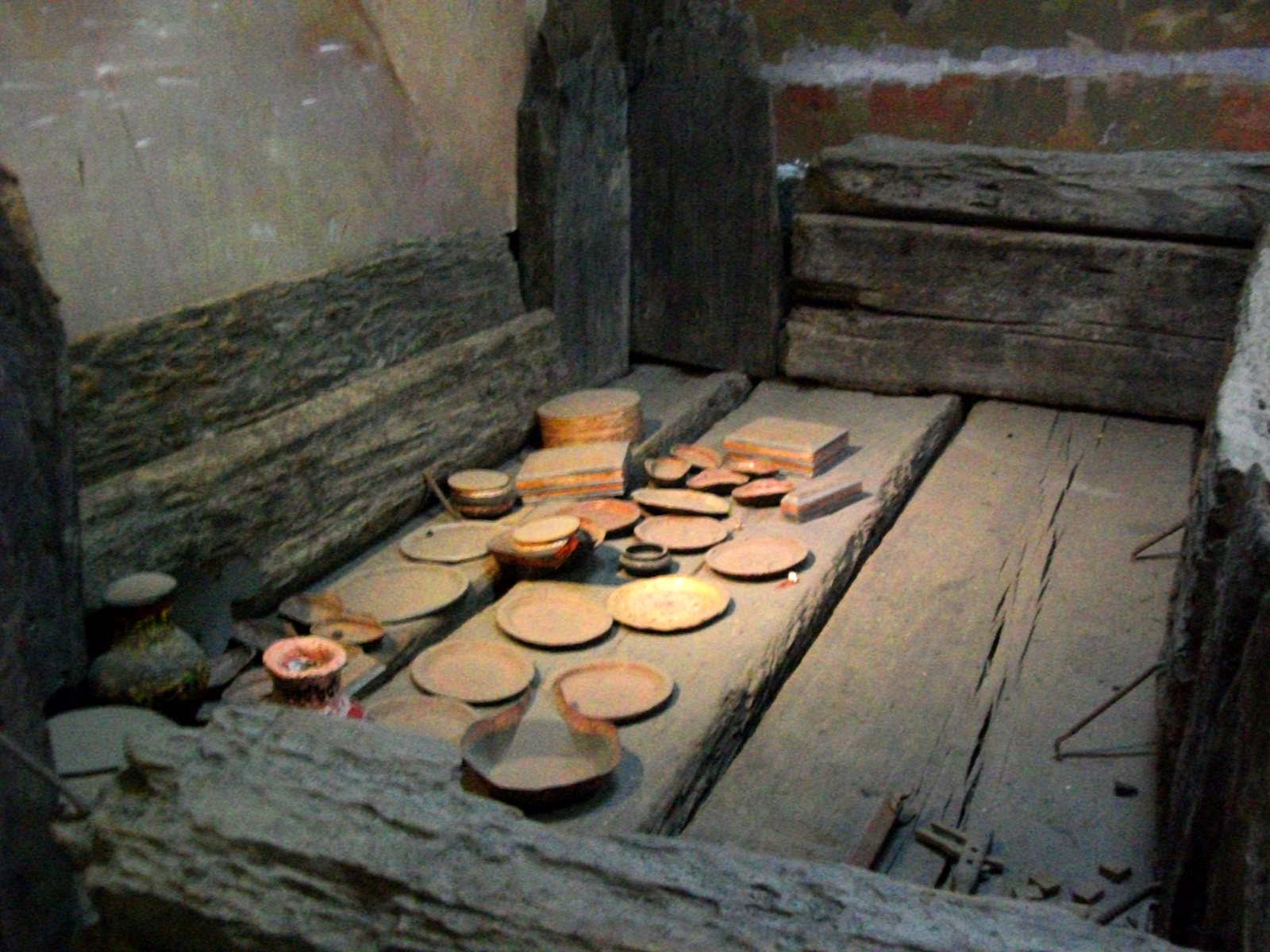
Tomb of Xiahou Zao (rear). The site of Xiahou Zao's tomb became known as Shuanggudui

=== Early Ruyin ===
Starting with the Qin dynasty, the region now called Fuyang was called Ruyin (汝陰). Ruyin was classified as part of the ancient province of Yuzhou. In the early Han dynasty, Ruyin was ruled by Xiahou Ying (d. 172 BCE), who fought alongside Liu Bang against the latter's archrival Xiang Yu in the Chu–Han Contention (206–202 BC), and helped Liu Bang establish the Han dynasty. Following the establishment of the Han dynasty, the title conferred upon Xiahou Ying was "Lord of Ruyin" (汝陰侯). The second Lord of Ruyin was Xiahou Ying's son, Xiahou Zao (夏侯灶) (d. 165 BCE), whose tomb was later rediscovered in Fuyang in 1977.

=== Shuanggudui ===
The site of the second Lord of Ruyin's tomb, called Shuanggudui, was rediscovered in 1977 when Fuyang's municipal airport was undergoing an expansion. Two tombs were found, although only one contained texts. Much like Mawangdui, important classical Chinese texts were found at Shuanggudui that shed new light on ancient Chinese culture and literature. Texts recorded on bamboo strips were found at Shuanggudui, including the Yijing, Classic of Poetry, Zhuangzi, Cang Jie Pian (primer), Classic for Physiognomizing Dogs (相狗經), tables of historical annals, studies of myriad phenomena (萬物), a text on xingqi (行氣, circulating breath), and others.

=== Ouyang Xiu ===
Ouyang Xiu, one of famous Eight Masters of the Tang and Song, died in 1072 in present-day Fuyang, Anhui. His influence was so great, even opponents like Wang Anshi wrote moving tributes on his behalf. Wang referred to him as the greatest literary figure of his age.

=== Red Turban Rebellion ===
In the fourteenth century, Han Shantong sought to overthrow the ruling Mongol Yuan dynasty. Han styled himself as the "Great King of Light," claiming to be an incarnation of Maitreya Bodhisattva, and heir to the preceding Song dynasty. Han was a native of Yingzhou, where he began the main thrust of the Red Turban Rebellion in 1351, initially gaining the support of 3000 rebels, and later 10,000. After entering Shandong province, the Red Turban Army merged with other rebel movements, eventually leading indirectly to the founding of the Ming dynasty.

=== Great Leap Forward ===
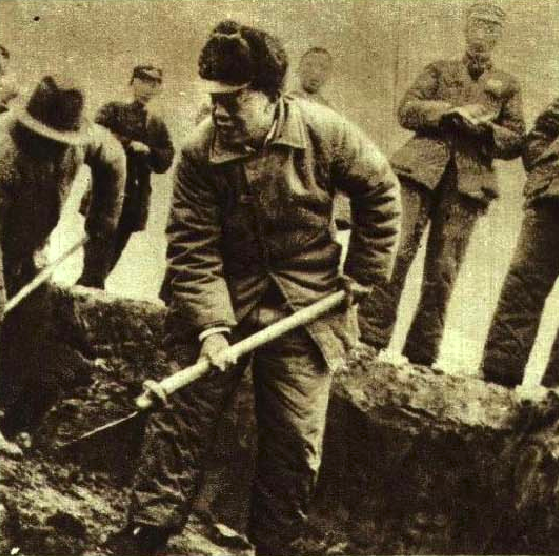
Anhui province Party secretary Zeng Xisheng (曾希圣) in 1950

According to Chinese government reports in the Fuyang Party History Research Office, between the years 1959 and 1961, 2.4 million people from Fuyang died from famine. Before the famines, in 1958, the population of Fuyang had been 8 million people. During this period, Zeng Xisheng, the provincial Party secretary of Anhui, pursued large water conservation projects that led to insufficient irrigation for local crops, leading to mass starvation. Local cadres, fearing repercussions from Zeng, underreported death rates in their regions, in some cases forcing the starving villagers to hide if there was an official inspection. When Vice Chairman Dong Biwu came to visit the Fuyang region, provincial leaders ordered all corpses to be removed from Dong's travel route, and for edema patients to be rounded up and kept out of sight.

Since the 1980s there has been greater official Chinese recognition of the importance of policy mistakes in causing the disaster, and the Party has acknowledged that the disaster was caused mainly by gross mismanagement, using the expression, "Three parts natural disaster and seven parts man-made disaster."

=== Blood selling ===
In the 1990s, commercial blood selling schemes led to entire villages in Henan and Anhui being infected with the HIV virus. The government in Fuyang, which at that time was headed by Wang Huaizhong (王怀忠), encouraged rural villagers to sell blood as a way to supplement their income. The blood collectors would often draw too much blood, causing their feet to go numb, and sometimes people were even hung upside down against a wall to force blood to flow back into their arms.

As compensation for giving their blood, participants were given 50 yuan along with some food and drink. Many people engaged in this practice due to rural poverty and local corruption, which placed them under great economic stress. As one woman from Fuyang recalls:

We sold blood because we were poor. Wang Huaizhong was in power at that time and the government under him demanded that each farmer pay an extra agricultural tax. If you failed to pay, the officials would take away your pigs, corn, and grain. So the harvest was only good enough for a basic living. But keeping children at school was expensive. Giving out gifts every year cost a family nearly ten thousand yuan. Building rooms to bring in a wife cost thirty thousand to forty thousand yuan. But if the government did not encourage blood selling, we would not have sold blood to make money.

In a 2004 epidemiological survey of Fuyang, it was found that at least three thousand farmers had contracted HIV due to the blood trade.

The Fuyang AIDS Orphan Salvation Association (阜阳市艾滋病贫困儿童救助协会) has done some relief work to help AIDS orphans in Fuyang. The 2006 short film, The Blood of Yingzhou District, documents the many challenges faced by AIDS orphans living in rural parts of Fuyang's Yingzhou district.

Wang Huaizhong, who promoted blood selling in Fuyang in the early 1990s, was later promoted to deputy governor of Anhui province. However, in 2001, he was arrested for taking bribes. He was later convicted of accepting bribes totaling 5.17 million yuan, and having 4.8 million yuan of unaccountable assets. After being taken into custody, Wang attempted to bribe investigators into dropping the investigation, and continued to seek bribes from private business owners. In response, the court sentenced him to death, stating, "His attitude was disgusting and he was severely punished in accordance with the law." In February 2004, just two months after his trial, Wang was executed by lethal injection.

Wang Huaizhong had previously pursued the construction of a large airport in Fuyang that was widely regarded as a boondoggle, costing 390 million yuan, but which served only 920 passengers in 2002.

=== Recent events ===
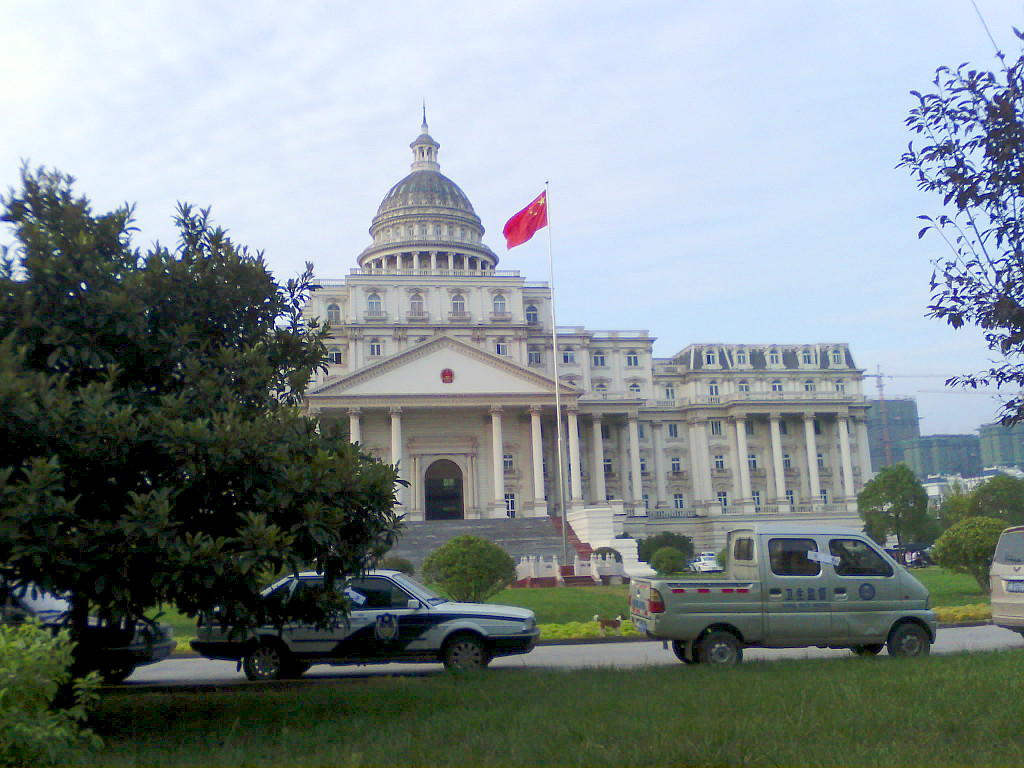
Fuyang's "White House" in Yingquan District

In 2004, there was a food scandal involving fake infant formula being sold in Fuyang. Chinese state media reported that 50–60 children in Fuyang died from the formula, with the children belonging mostly to poor rural families. Fuyang's mayor Liu Qingqiang was reprimanded by the Chinese Communist Party for failing to supervise food safety, while Vice Mayor Ma Mingyue was forced to resign. Subsequently, 55 brands of cheap infant formula were banned after it was discovered they had only traces of the required nutrients.

In early 2007, Chinese state media began reporting that in Yingquan District, a government building dubbed the "White House" was becoming controversial. The construction cost of the "White House" was reported to have reached 30 million yuan, nearly one third of the 100 million yuan annual fiscal income of the entire Yingquan district. Despite being popularly deemed the "White House" (白宫), the building resembles the United States Capitol.

In 2008, it was widely reported that Zhang Zhi'an (张治安), the Communist Party chief of Yingquan District, nicknamed the "White House Party Chief," had been suspended from his office on June 5, 2008, along several other officials. They were under investigation for the death of Li Guofu (李国福), a businessman who acted as a whistleblower. In Beijing, Li Guofu had accused Zhang of corruption and abuse of power, and hoped that Yingquan District would reclaim the area as farmland. In August 2007, Li Guofu was arrested by the Yingquan government on corruption charges and imprisoned. Zhang interrogated Li, threatening his family, and extracted a confession from him. On March 13, 2008, just hours before he was scheduled to see a lawyer, Li Guofu was found hanged. Although his death was deemed a suicide, media reported that Li Guofu's body was bruised and his mouth was tightly shut, uncharacteristic of a suicide by hanging. On February 8, 2010, Zhang was found guilty of taking bribes, retaliation, and framing an innocent person, and was sentenced to death with a two-year reprieve.

In March 2008, an outbreak of hand, foot, and mouth disease began in Fuyang, leading to 25,000 infections, and 42 deaths, by May 13.

In 2017, 18 people died in a car pile-up on an expressway near Fuyang.

== Climate ==
Fuyang features a monsoon-influenced humid subtropical climate (Köppen Cwa) with cool, damp winters and very hot and wet summers. Because the weather is perceived as frequently changing, a common saying among local people is that, "Fuyang has four seasons in spring."

Climate data for Fuyang, elevation 33 m (108 ft), (1991–2020 normals, extremes 1971–present)
Month	Jan	Feb	Mar	Apr	May	Jun	Jul	Aug	Sep	Oct	Nov	Dec	Year
Record high °C (°F)	20.5 (68.9)	27.7 (81.9)	34.2 (93.6)	34.3 (93.7)	37.7 (99.9)	39.8 (103.6)	40.8 (105.4)	39.0 (102.2)	38.9 (102.0)	34.7 (94.5)	30.4 (86.7)	22.9 (73.2)	40.8 (105.4)
Mean daily maximum °C (°F)	6.7 (44.1)	10.1 (50.2)	15.4 (59.7)	21.8 (71.2)	27.0 (80.6)	30.8 (87.4)	32.1 (89.8)	31.2 (88.2)	27.6 (81.7)	22.6 (72.7)	15.7 (60.3)	9.1 (48.4)	20.8 (69.5)
Daily mean °C (°F)	1.9 (35.4)	4.9 (40.8)	10.0 (50.0)	16.1 (61.0)	21.5 (70.7)	25.7 (78.3)	27.9 (82.2)	26.8 (80.2)	22.5 (72.5)	16.9 (62.4)	10.1 (50.2)	4.0 (39.2)	15.7 (60.2)
Mean daily minimum °C (°F)	−1.9 (28.6)	0.9 (33.6)	5.4 (41.7)	10.9 (51.6)	16.4 (61.5)	21.2 (70.2)	24.3 (75.7)	23.4 (74.1)	18.5 (65.3)	12.3 (54.1)	5.7 (42.3)	0.0 (32.0)	11.4 (52.6)
Record low °C (°F)	−14.2 (6.4)	−14.9 (5.2)	−5.5 (22.1)	−0.3 (31.5)	5.9 (42.6)	11.4 (52.5)	17.3 (63.1)	14.4 (57.9)	8.4 (47.1)	0.5 (32.9)	−6.9 (19.6)	−13.1 (8.4)	−14.9 (5.2)
Average precipitation mm (inches)	28.4 (1.12)	32.0 (1.26)	57.1 (2.25)	58.7 (2.31)	87.6 (3.45)	160.8 (6.33)	209.2 (8.24)	141.7 (5.58)	79.3 (3.12)	53.1 (2.09)	41.6 (1.64)	22.5 (0.89)	972 (38.28)
Average precipitation days (≥ 0.1 mm)	6.2	7.2	7.6	7.6	9.4	9.4	12.3	11.9	8.2	7.7	7.3	5.3	100.1
Average snowy days	4.1	2.5	1.0	0	0	0	0	0	0	0	0.7	1.6	9.9
Average relative humidity (%)	72	71	70	71	72	73	81	83	78	73	72	71	74
Mean monthly sunshine hours	111.9	116.3	151.5	181.7	185.8	167.9	175.2	162.6	144.7	147.5	137.2	125.8	1,808.1
Percentage possible sunshine	35	37	41	46	43	39	40	40	39	42	44	41	41
Source 1: China Meteorological Administration
Source 2: Weather China

== Administration ==
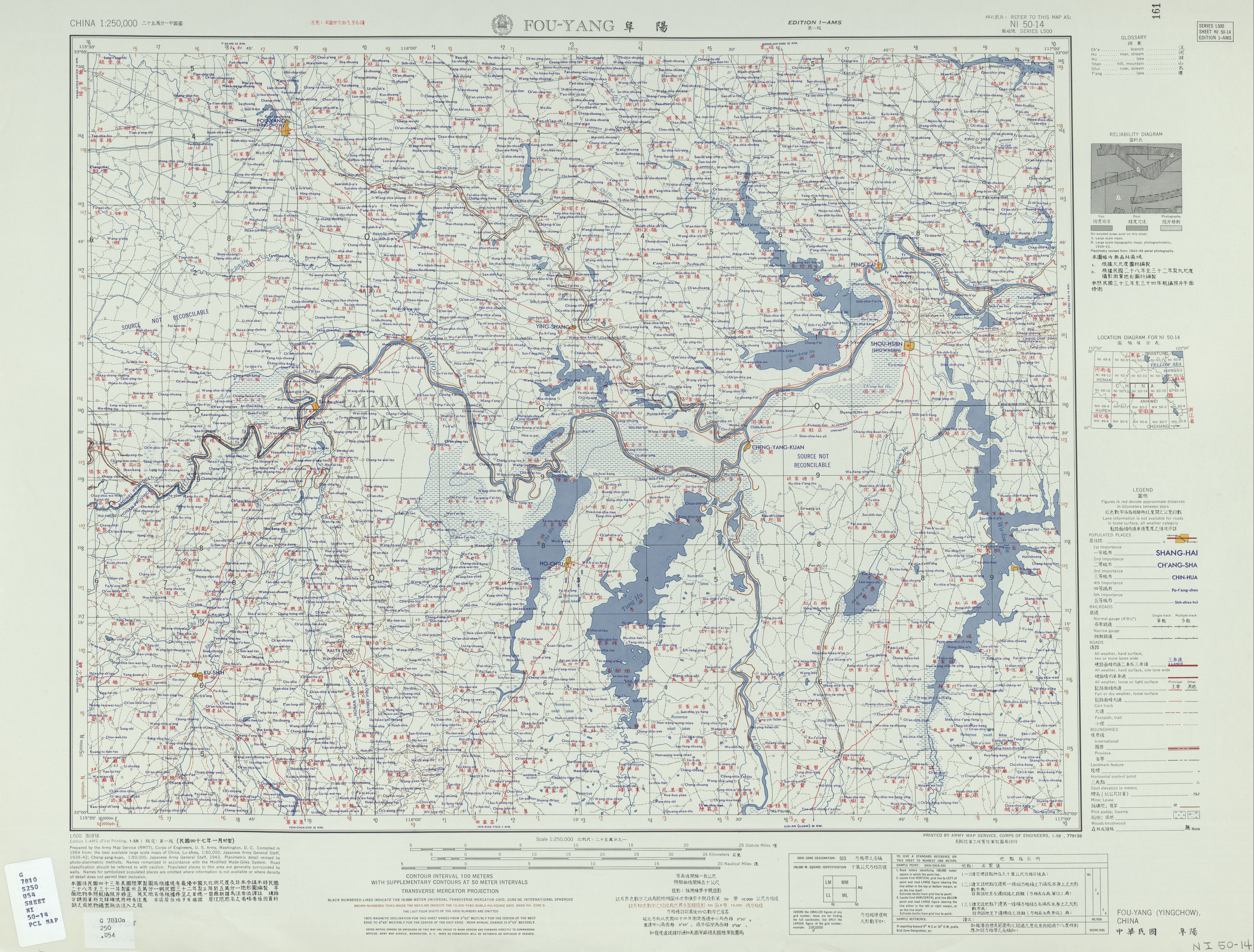
Map including Fuyang (labeled as FOU-YANG (YINGCHOW) 阜陽) (AMS, 1954)

The prefecture-level city of Fuyang administers eight county-level divisions, including three districts, one county-level city and four counties.

- Yingzhou District (颍州区)
- Yingdong District (颍东区)
- Yingquan District (颍泉区)
- Jieshou City (界首市)
- Taihe County (太和县)
- Linquan County (临泉县)
- Funan County (阜南县)
- Yingshang County (颍上县)

Map
Subdivision	Simplified Chinese	Hanyu Pinyin	Population (2020)	Area (km^{2})	Density (/km^{2})
City Proper
Yingdong District	颍东区	Yĭngdōng Qū	538,187	677.3	794.6
Yingquan District	颍泉区	Yĭngquán Qū	598,004	653.5	915.1
Yingzhou District	颍州区	Yĭngzhōu Qū	992,347	612.0	1,621
Rural
Yingshang County	颍上县	Yĭngshàng Xiàn	1,198,830	2,004	598.1
Funan County	阜南县	Fùnán Xiàn	1,183,602	1,817	651.3
Linquan County	临泉县	Línquán Xiàn	1,658,442	1,834	904.4
Taihe County	太和县	Tàihé Xiàn	1,379,982	1,867	739.1
Satellite Cities
Jieshou City	界首市	Jièshŏu Shì	650,870	652.6	997.3
Total			8,200,264	10,118	810.5

== Culture ==
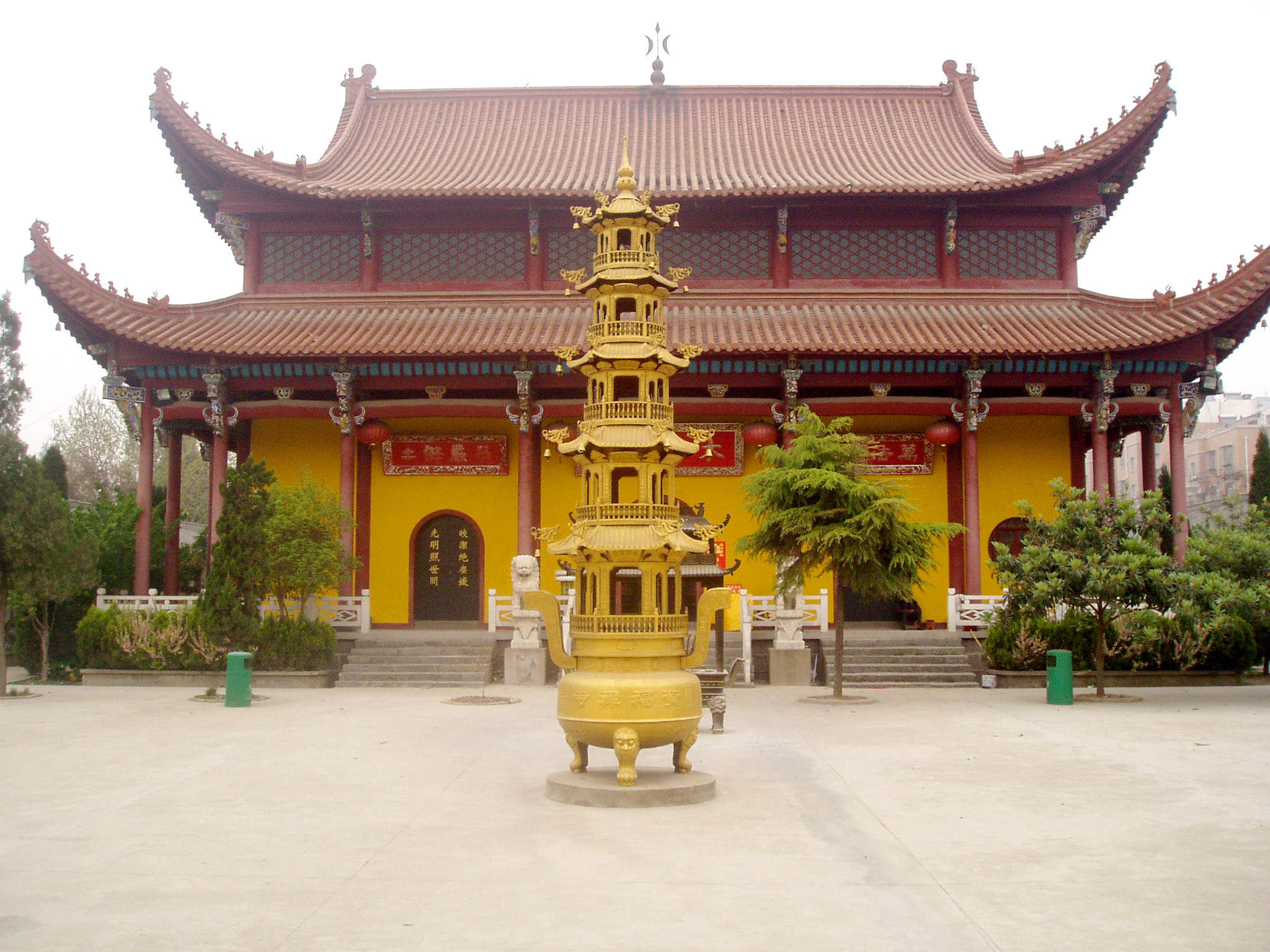
Zifu Chan Monastery

=== Cuisine ===
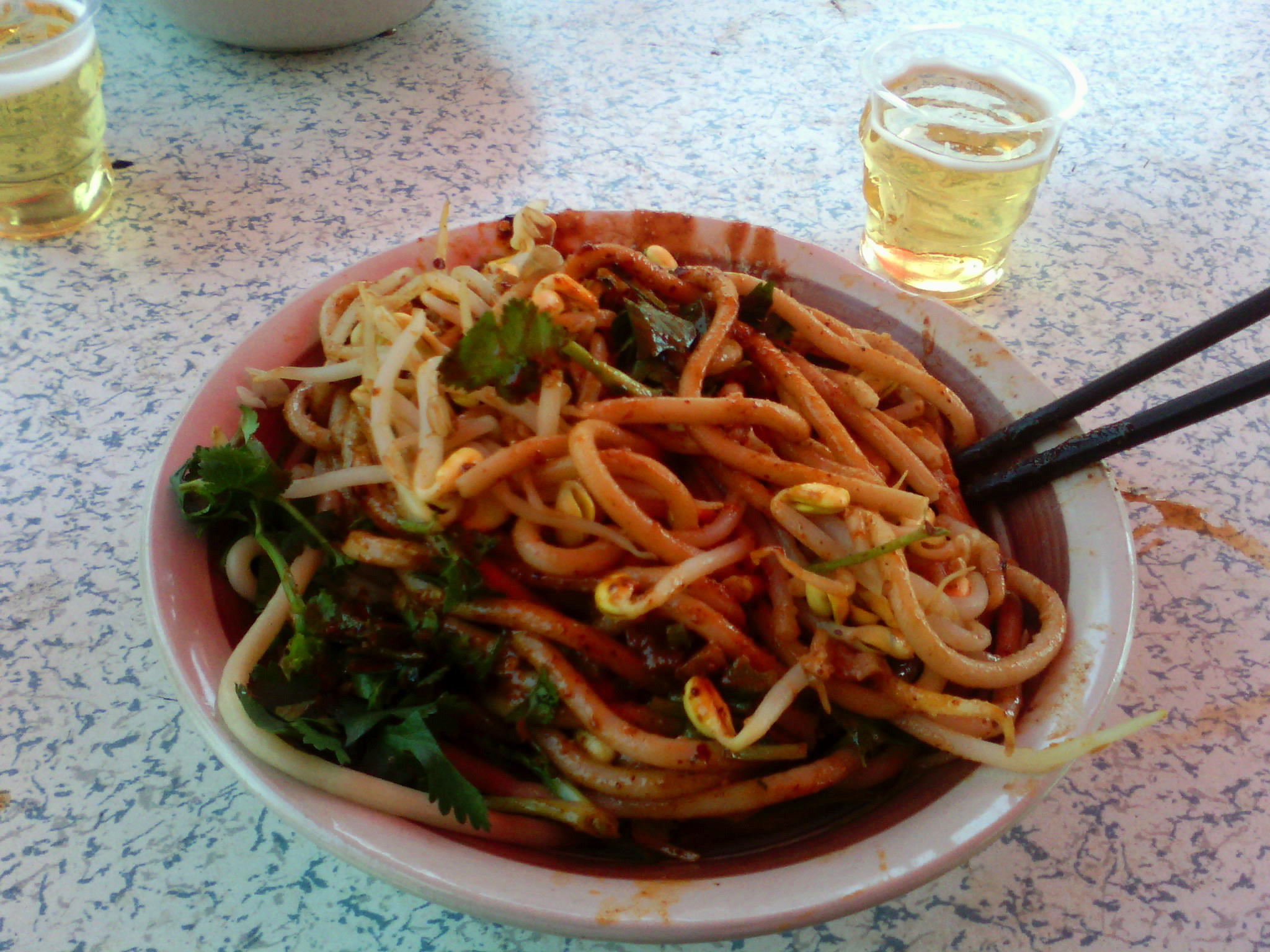
Ge La Tiao, a popular local dish made with thick noodles

The most notable local dish in Fuyang is Ge La Tiao (格拉条), a spicy noodle dish made with thick noodles mixed with sesame sauce, coriander, garlic, chili oil, and other ingredients. Many people native to Fuyang enjoy this dish, but some people who come to Fuyang from other areas may dislike it and find it difficult to digest.

Other notable local dishes include:

- Taihe Yangrou Banmian (太和羊肉板面): a very common noodle dish served in Fuyang. This dish includes wide, flat noodles, along with Chinese cabbage, lamb, and red chili peppers.
- Fen Ji (粉鸡): a chicken soup made with cellophane noodles, breaded chicken, quail eggs, dasheen powder, and other seasonings.
- Zhen Tou Mo (枕头馍): a type of large steamed bread, which is often compared in size and shape to a pillow.
- Tian San Juan Mo (田三卷膜): a type of pancake wrapped in the shape of a cone, stuffed with bean sprouts, tofu, and other ingredients, with sauce on top.

The most common type of Chinese tea in Fuyang is Huangshan Maofeng, followed by other teas such as Lu'an Guapian, Keemun black tea (Qimen Hongcha), and Taiping Houkui. Teas from outside the region are also popular, such as Tieguanyin and Longjing.

== Transportation ==
=== Automobile ===
The G36 Nanjing–Luoyang Expressway goes through Fuyang, and runs from Nanjing, Jiangsu to the east, to Luoyang, Henan to the west.

=== Rail ===
Fuyang has a large railway station, and is a railway transportation hub for Anhui province. The Shangqiu-Hefei-Hangzhou High-speed Rail was opened in 2019, which serve Fuyang through the new Fuyang West railway station.

=== Air ===
Flights to and from major cities in China are possible through Fuyang Airport.

== Education ==
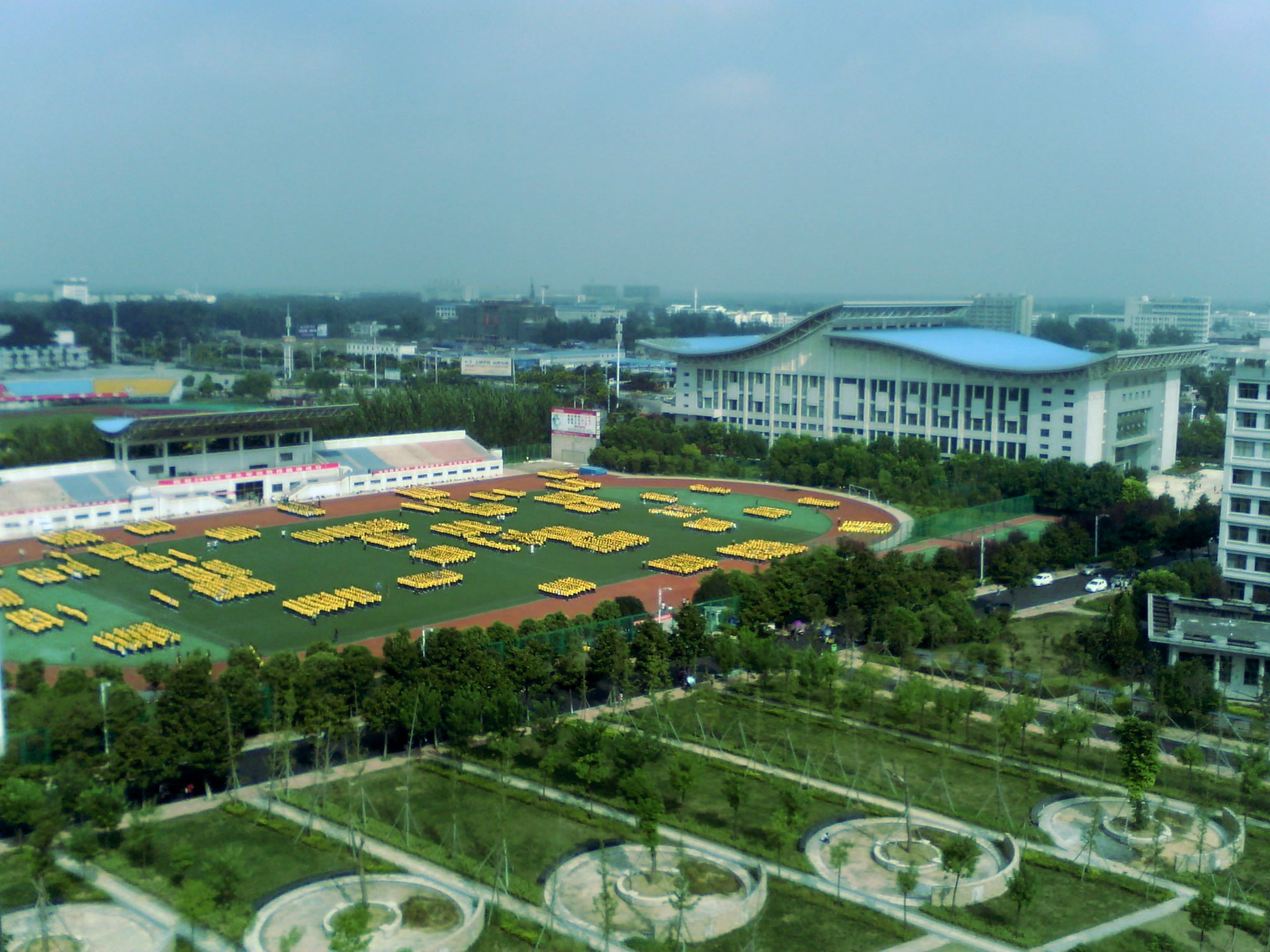
Fuyang Normal University, the largest higher learning institution

The city of Fuyang includes the following institutions of higher learning:

- Fuyang Normal University (阜阳师范大学)
- Fuyang Vocational and Technical College (阜阳职业技术学院)
- Fuyang Vocational College of Science and Technology (阜阳科技职业学院)

Fuyang Normal University is the largest institution of higher learning in the city of Fuyang. The university has three campuses with over 21,000 students and over 1100 full-time teachers.

== Notable people ==
- Guan Zhong (?−645 BC), Spring and Autumn period politician and economist
- Lü Meng (178−219), Three Kingdoms era military general serving the Kingdom of Wu
- Ni Sichong (1868–1924), general, part of the Anhui clique until resigning in 1920 due to the disastrous defeat in the Zhili–Anhui War
- Dai Houying (1938 – 1996), novelist
- Xie Yi (1967), chemist
- Deng Linlin (1992), gymnast
- Wang Xiaolong (1995-2023), the only Chinese Coast Guardsman killed in the line of duty
