= List of township-level divisions of Anhui =

Location of Anhui province in China

This is a list of township-level divisions of the province of Anhui, People's Republic of China (PRC). After province, prefecture, and county-level divisions, township-level divisions constitute the formal fourth-level administrative divisions of the PRC. There are a total of 1,507 such divisions in Anhui, divided into 225 subdistricts, 898 towns, 377 townships, and 7 ethnic townships. This list is divided first into the prefecture-level cities, then the county-level divisions.

== Hefei ==
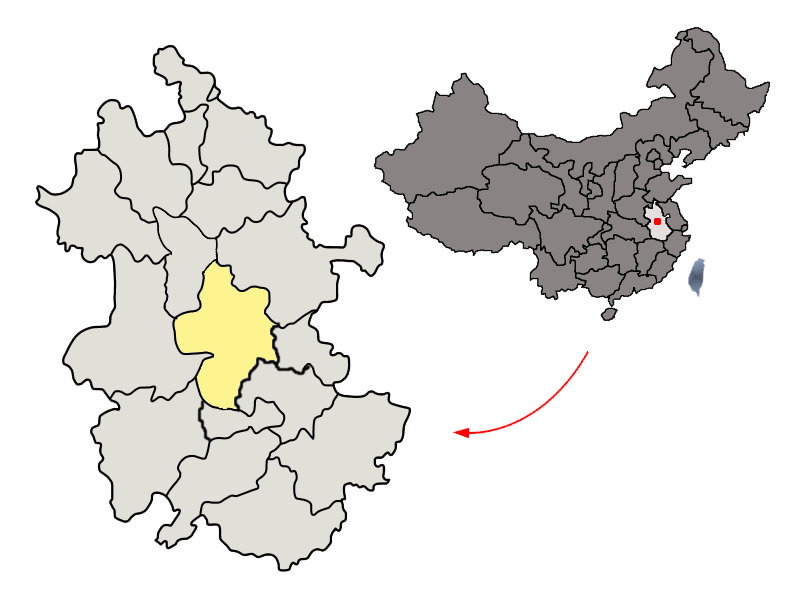
Location of Hefei in the province

=== Baohe District ===
Subdistricts

- Changqing Subdistrict (常青街道), Ningguo Road Subdistrict (宁国路街道), Wuhu Road Subdistrict (芜湖路街道), Chaohu Road Subdistrict (巢湖路街道), Luogang Subdistrict (骆岗街道), Yicheng Subdistrict (义城街道)

Towns

- Feihe (淝河镇), Daxu (大圩镇)

=== Luyang District ===
Subdistricts

- Xinghuacun Subdistrict (杏花村街道), Sanpailou Subdistrict (三牌楼街道), Guangming Subdistrict (光明街道), Xianqiao Subdistrict (县桥街道), Bozhou Road Subdistrict (亳州路街道), Shouchun Road Subdistrict (寿春路街道), Shuanggang Subdistrict (双岗街道), Yimin Subdistrict (益民街道), Anqing Road Subdistrict (安庆路街道), Xiaoyaojin Subdistrict (逍遥津街道), Gulou Subdistrict (鼓楼街道), Haitang Subdistrict (海棠街道)

Towns

- Dayang (大杨镇)

Townships

- Sanshigang Township (三十岗乡)

=== Shushan District ===
Subdistricts

- Daoxiangcun Subdistrict (稻香村街道), Sanli'an Subdistrict (三里庵街道), South Qili Station Subdistrict (南七里站街道), Wulidun Subdistrict (五里墩街道), West Yuanxicun Subdistrict (西园新村街道), Huposhanzhuang Subdistrict (琥珀山庄街道), Heyedi Subdistrict (荷叶地街道), Maojiashan Subdistrict (笔架山街道)

Towns

- Jinggang (井岗镇), Nangang (南岗镇)

=== Yaohai District ===
Subdistricts

- Chengdong Subdistrict (城东街道), Shengli Road Subdistrict (胜利路街道), Mingguang Road Subdistrict (明光路街道), Sanli Avenue Subdistrict (三里街街道), Tongling Road Subdistrict (铜陵路街道), Qilizhan Subdistrict (七里站街道), Datong Road Subdistrict (大通路街道), Hongguang Subdistrict (红光街道), Heping Road Subdistrict (和平路街道), Chezhan Subdistrict (车站街道)

Towns

- Daxing (大兴镇)

Townships

- Modian Township (磨店乡).

Others

- Yaohai Industrial Park (瑶海工业园), Longgang Development Zone (龙岗开发区)

=== Chaohu City ===
Subdistricts:

- Woniushan Subdistrict (卧牛山街道), Yafu Subdistrict (亚父街道), Tianhe Subdistrict (天河街道), Bantang Subdistrict (半汤街道), Fenghuangshan Subdistrict (凤凰山街道), Zhongmiao Subdistrict (中庙街道)

Towns:

- Zhegao (柘皋镇), Jiongyang (烔炀镇), Huanglu (黄麓镇), Huailin (槐林镇), Zhong'an (中垾镇), Sanbing (散兵镇), Suwan (苏湾镇), Xiage (夏阁镇), Bazhen (坝镇镇), Yinping (银屏镇), Langanji (栏杆集镇)

The only township is Miaogang Township (庙岗乡)

=== Changfeng County ===
Towns:

- Shuihu (水湖镇), Shuangdun (双墩镇), Gangji (岗集镇), Sanshitou (三十头镇), Xiatang (下塘镇), Wushan (吴山镇), Yangmiao (杨庙镇), Zhuxiang (朱巷镇), Zhuangmu (庄墓镇)

Townships:

- Luotang Township (罗塘乡), Yijing Township (义井乡), Zuodian Township (左店乡), Duji Township (杜集乡), Zaojia Township (造甲乡), Taolou Township (陶楼乡)

Other:

- Shuangfeng Development Zone (双凤开发区)

=== Feidong County ===
Towns

- Dianbu (店埠镇), Zuozhen (撮镇镇), Liangyuan (梁园镇), Qiatouji (桥头集镇), Changlinhe (长临河镇), Shitang (石塘镇), Gucheng (古城镇), Badou (八斗镇), Yuantuan (元疃镇), Bailong (白龙镇), Baogong (包公镇)

Townships

- Zhongxing Township (众兴乡), Zhangji Township (张集乡), Mahu Township (马湖乡), Chenji Township (陈集乡), Xiangdao Township (响导乡), Yangdian Township (杨店乡), Paifang Hui and Manchu Ethnic Township (牌坊回族满族乡)

=== Feixi County ===
Towns

- Shangpai (上派镇), Sanhe (三河镇), Taohua (桃花镇), Huagang (花岗镇), Gaoliu (高刘镇), Guanxiang (官亭镇), Xiaomiao (小庙镇), Shannan (山南镇), Fengle (丰乐镇), Zipeng (紫蓬镇)

Townships

- Gaodian Township (高店乡), Mingchuan Township (铭传乡), Shishugang Township (柿树岗乡), Yandian Township (严店乡)

Other Areas

- Taohua Industrial Park Management Committee (桃花工业园管委会), Zipengshan Management Committee (紫蓬山管委会)

=== Lujiang County ===
Towns:

- Lucheng (庐城镇), Yefushan (冶父山镇), Tangchi (汤池镇), Wanshan (万山镇), Jinniu (金牛镇), Leqiao (乐桥镇), Guohe (郭河镇), Shitou (石头镇), Baishan (白山镇), Tongda (同大镇), Ketan (柯坦镇), Shengqiao (盛桥镇), Longqiao (龙桥镇), Baihu (白湖镇), Fanshan (矾山镇), Nihe (泥河镇), Luohe (罗河镇)

== Anqing ==
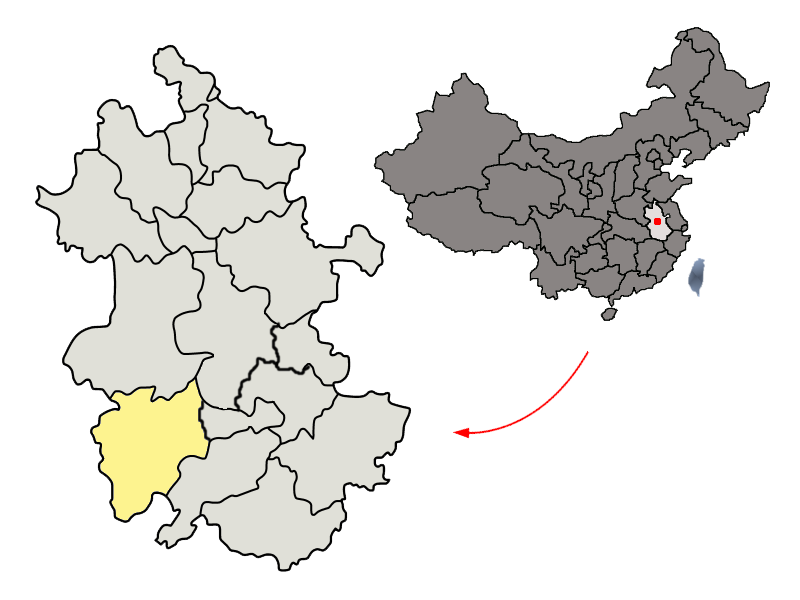
Location of Anqing in the province

=== Daguan District ===
Subdistricts:

- Yulin Road Subdistrict (玉琳路街道), Dekuan Road Subdistrict (德宽路街道), Longshan Road Subdistrict (龙山路街道), Jixuan Road Subdistrict (集贤路街道), Huaxiang Road Subdistrict (花亭路街道), Shihua Road Subdistrict (石化路街道), Linghu Subdistrict (菱湖街道)

Towns:

- Haikou (海口镇)

=== Yingjiang District ===
Subdistricts:

- Renmin Road Subdistrict (人民路街道), Huazhong Road Subdistrict (华中路街道), Xiaosu Road Subdistrict (孝肃路街道), Yicheng Road Subdistrict (宜城路街道), Xinhe Road Subdistrict (新河路街道), Jianshe Road Subdistrict (建设路街道)

Towns:

- Changfeng (长风镇), Xinzhou (新洲镇), Longshiqiao (龙狮桥镇), Laofeng (老峰镇)

=== Yixiu District ===
The only subdistrict is Daqiao Subdistrict (大桥街道)

Towns:

- Dalongshan (大龙山镇), Luoling (罗岭镇), Yangqiao (杨桥镇)

Townships:

- Wuheng Township (五横乡), Baizehu Township (百泽湖乡)

Others:

- Daqiao Economic Development Zone (大桥经济开发区)

=== Tongcheng ===
Subdistricts:

- Longteng Subdistrict (龙腾街道), Wenchang Subdistrict (文昌街道), Longmin Subdistrict (龙眠街道)

Towns:

- Xindu (新渡镇), Shuanggang (双港镇), Qingcao (青草镇), Kongcheng (孔城镇), Daguan (大关镇), Fangang (范岗镇), Jinshen (金神镇), Lüting (吕亭镇), Tangwan (唐湾镇), Huangjia (黄甲镇), Xunyu (鲟鱼镇), Xizihu (嬉子湖镇)

Others:

- Tongcheng Economic Development Zone (桐城经济开发区), Tongcheng Shuangxin Economic Development Zone (桐城双新经济开发区)

=== Huaining County ===
Towns:

- Gaohe (高河镇), Shipai (石牌镇), Yueshan (月山镇), Hongpu (洪铺镇), Chaling (茶岭镇), Jingong (金拱镇), Sanqiao (三桥镇), Huangdun (黄墩镇), Jiangzhen (江镇镇), Xiaoshi (小市镇), Lashu (腊树镇), Huanglong (黄龙镇), Gongling (公岭镇), Pingshan (平山镇), Mamiao (马庙镇)

Townships:

- Liangting Township (凉亭乡), Xiushan Township (秀山乡), Qinghe Township (清河乡), Leibu Township (雷埠乡), Shijing Township (石镜乡)

=== Qianshan ===
Towns:

- Meicheng (梅城镇), Huangni (黄泥镇), Yuantan (源潭镇), Wanghe (王河镇), Yujing (余井镇), Huangpu (黄铺镇), Shuihou (水吼镇), Huangbai (黄柏镇), Guanzhuang (官庄镇), Chashui (槎水镇), Tianzhushan (天柱山镇)

Townships:

- Youba Township (油坝乡), Doumu Township (痘姆乡), Longtan Township (龙潭乡), Wumiao Township (五庙乡), Tafan Township (塔畈乡)

=== Susong County ===
Towns:

- Fuyu (孚玉镇), Fuxing (复兴镇), Xuling (许岭镇), Xiacang (下仓镇), Erlang (二郎镇), Liangting (凉亭镇), Poliang (破凉镇), Huikou (汇口镇), Changpu (长铺镇)

Townships:

- Chenhan Township (陈汉乡), Aikou Township (隘口乡), Zuoba Township (佐坝乡), Qianling Township (千岭乡), Jiugu Township (九姑乡), Chengling Township (程岭乡), Zhoutou Township (洲头乡), Wuli Township (五里乡), Beiyu Township (北浴乡), Liuping Township (柳坪乡), Zhifeng Township (趾凤乡), Heta Township (河塌乡), Gaoling Township (高岭乡))

Others:

- 九成监狱管理分局, 华阳河农场总场

=== Taihu County ===
Towns

- Jinxi (晋熙镇), Xuqiao (徐桥镇), Xiaochi (小池镇), Xincang (新仓镇), Siqian (寺前镇), Tianhua (天华镇), Niuzhen (牛镇镇), Mituo (弥陀镇), Beizhong (北中镇), Baili (百里镇)

Townships

- Chengxi Township (城西乡), Jiangtang Township (江塘乡), Dashi Township (大石乡), Yangquan Township (汤泉乡), Liufan Township (刘畈乡)

=== Wangjiang County ===
Towns

- Huayang (华阳镇), Saikou (赛口镇), Yatan (雅滩镇), Changling (长岭镇), Taici (太慈镇), Zhanghu (漳湖镇), Gaotu (高土镇), Yangwan (杨湾镇)

Townships:

- Leichi Township (雷池乡), Liangquan Township (凉泉乡)

=== Yuexi County ===
Towns:

- Tiantang (天堂镇), Dianqian (店前镇), Laipang (来榜镇), Changpu (菖蒲镇), Toutuo (头陀镇), Baimao (白帽镇), Wenquan (温泉镇), Xiangchang (响肠镇), Hetu (河图镇), Wuhe (五河镇), Zhubu (主簿镇), Yexi (冶溪镇), Huangwei (黄尾镇)

Townships:

- Lianyun Township (莲云乡), Qingtian Township (青天乡), Baojia Township (包家乡), Gufang Township (古坊乡), Tiantou Township (田头乡), Zhongguan Township (中关乡), Shiguan Township (石关乡), Yaohe Township (姚河乡), Heping Township (和平乡), Weiling Township (巍岭乡), Maojianshan Township (毛尖山乡)

=== Zongyang County ===
Seventeen towns:

- Zongyang (枞阳镇), Oushan (𠙶山镇), Tanggou (汤沟镇), Laozhou (老洲镇), Chenyaohu (陈瑶湖镇), Zhoutan (周潭镇), Hengbu (横埠镇), Xiangpu (项铺镇), Qianqiao (钱桥镇), Qilin (麒麟镇), Yijin (义津镇), Fushan (浮山镇), Huigong (会宫镇), Guanbuqiao (官埠桥镇), Qianpu (钱铺镇), Jinshe (金社镇), Bailiu (白柳镇)

Five townships:

- Tietong Township (铁铜乡), Fengyi Township (凤仪乡), Changsha Township (长沙乡), Baimei Township (白梅乡), Yutan Township (雨坛乡)

Other area:

- Zongyang Economic Development Area (枞阳经济开发区)

== Bengbu ==
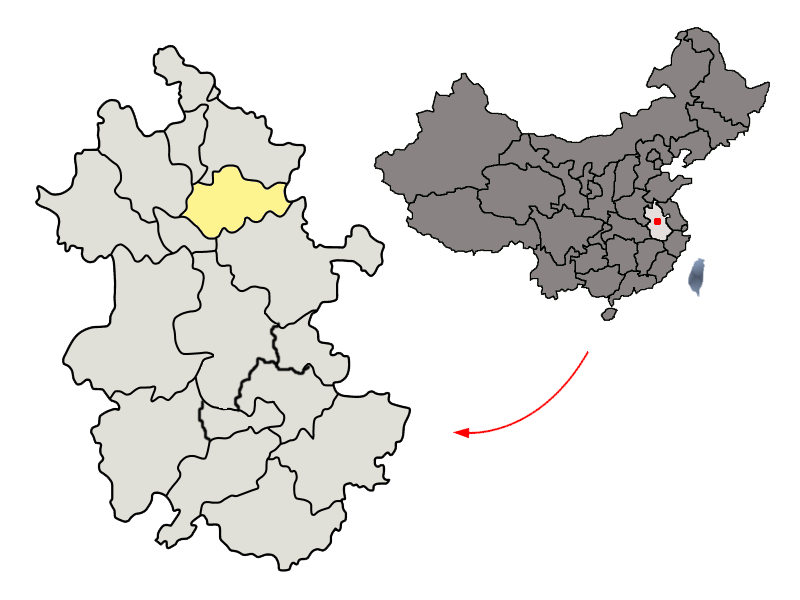
Location of Bengbu in the province

=== Bengshan District ===
Subdistricts:

- Tianqiao Subdistrict (天桥街道), Qingnian Subdistrict (青年街道), Wei'erlu Subdistrict (纬二路街道), Huangzhuang Subdistrict (黄庄街道), Hongyecun Subdistrict (宏业村街道)

Townships:

- Xuehua Township (雪华乡), Yanshan Township (燕山乡)

=== Huaishang District ===
The only subdistrict is Huaibin Subdistrict (淮滨街道).

Towns

- Xiaobengbu (小蚌埠镇), Wuxiaojie (吴小街镇), Caolaoji (曹老集镇)

The only township is Meiqiao Township (梅桥乡).

=== Longzihu District ===
Subdistricts:

- Zhihuai Subdistrict (治淮街道), Dongfeng Subdistrict (东风街道), Dongsheng Subdistrict (东升街道), Yan'an Subdistrict (延安街道), Caoshan Subdistrict (曹山街道), Jiefang Subdistrict (解放街道)

The only town is Changhuaiwei (长淮卫镇), and the only township is Lilou Township (李楼乡)

=== Yuhui District ===
- Chaoyang Subdistrict (朝阳街道), Diaoyutai Subdistrict (钓鱼台街道), Zhanggongshan Subdistrict (张公山街道), Daqing Subdistrict (大庆街道), Weisi Subdistrict (纬四街道)

Towns

- Qinji (秦集镇)

Townships

- Changqing Township (长青乡)

=== Huaiyuan County ===
Towns

- Tangji (唐集镇), Shuangqiaoji (双桥集镇), Baoji (鲍集镇), Macheng (马城镇), Longkang (龙亢镇), Heliu (河溜镇), Changfen (常坟镇), Weizhuang (魏庄镇), Chengguan Town (城关镇), Wanfu (万福镇)

Townships

- Zhaoying Township (找郢乡), Yingqian Township (荆芡乡), Lanqiao Township (兰桥乡), Xuwei Township (徐圩乡), Chuji Township (褚集乡), Feihe Township (淝河乡), Feinan Township (淝南乡), Gucheng Township (古城乡), Chenji Township (陈集乡)

=== Wuhe County ===
Towns:

- Chengguan (城关镇), Dongliuji (东刘集镇), Xiaowei (小圩镇), Xiaoxi (小溪镇), Shuangzhongmiao (双忠庙镇), Xinji (新集镇), Mohekou (沫河口镇), Shenji (申集镇), Wuqiao (武桥镇), Toupu (头铺镇), Huinan (浍南镇), Daxin (大新镇), Zhuding (朱顶镇)

Townships

- Lunhu Township (沱湖乡), Linbei Hui Township (临北回族乡)

=== Guzhen County ===
Towns

- Chengguan (城关镇), Haocheng (濠城镇), Liancheng (连城镇), Renqiao (任桥镇), Hugou (湖沟镇), Xinmaqiao (新马桥镇), Liuji (刘集镇), Wangzhuang (王庄镇)

Townships

- Shihu Township (石湖乡), Yangmiao Township (杨庙乡), Zhongxing Township (仲兴镇)

== Bozhou ==
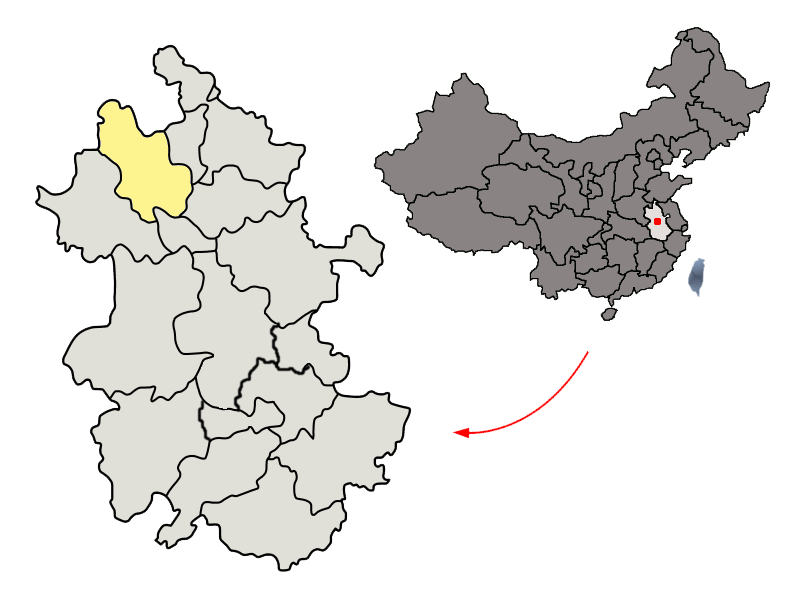
Location of Bozhou in the province

=== Qiaocheng District ===
Subdistricts:

- Tangling Subdistrict (汤陵街道), Huaxilou Subdistrict (花戏楼街道), Xuege Subdistrict (薛阁街道)

Towns:

- Gujing (古井镇), Shuanggou (双沟镇), Gucheng (古城镇), Feihe (淝河镇), Dayang (大杨镇), Chengfu (城父镇), Shihe (十河镇), Shuangtang (观堂镇), Wuma (五马镇), Weigang (魏岗镇), Niuji (牛集镇), Lumiao (芦庙镇), Longyang (龙扬镇), Qiaodong (谯东镇), Shatu (沙土镇), Shibali (十八里镇), Shijiuli (十九里镇), Yanji (颜集镇)

Townships:

- Zhangdian Township (张店乡), Zhaoqiao Township (赵桥乡)

=== Lixin County ===
Towns:

- Wuren (五人镇), Chengguan (城关镇), Jiangji (江集镇), Zhongtuan (中疃镇), Gongdian (巩店镇), Kantuan (阚疃镇), Wangtuan (望疃镇), Ruji (汝集镇), Huji (胡集镇), Xipanlou (西潘楼镇), Yongxing (永兴镇), Wangshi (王市镇), Jiucheng (旧城镇), Madianzi (马店孜镇), Sunji (孙集镇), Chengjiaji (程家集镇), Zhangou (展沟镇), Zhangcun (张村镇), Daliji (大李集镇)

Townships:

- Liujiaji Township (刘家集乡), Xinzhangji Township (新张集乡), Jiwangchang Township (纪王场乡), Sunmiao Township (孙庙乡)

=== Mengcheng County ===
Towns:

- Maji (马集镇), Chengguan (城关镇), Yuefang (岳坊镇), Xutuan (许疃镇), Tancheng (坛城镇), Letu (乐土镇), Licang (立仓镇), Sanyi (三义镇), Chucun (楚村镇), Xiaojian (小涧镇), Shuangjian (双涧镇), Liba (篱笆镇), Banqiaoji (板桥集镇)

Townships:

- Xiaoxinji Township (小辛集乡), Wangji Township (王集乡)

Others:

- Fanji Industrial Park (范集工业园), Baiyang Forestry (白杨林场)

=== Guoyang County ===
Subdistricts:

- Chengguan Subdistrict (城关街道), Chengxi Subdistrict (城西街道), Chengdong Subdistrict (城东街道), Guobei Subdistrict (涡北街道)

Towns:

- Xiyang (西阳镇), Guonan (涡南镇), Qingtuan (青疃镇), Dancheng (丹城镇), Shiyin (石弓镇), Longshan (龙山镇), Caoshi (曹市镇), Dianji (店集镇), Gaolu (高炉镇), Chudian (楚店镇), Gongjisi (公吉寺镇), Xinxing (新兴镇), Paifang (牌坊镇), Chenda (陈大镇), Yimen (义门镇), Huagou (花沟镇), Biaoli (标里镇), Linhu (临湖镇), Gaogong (高公镇), Madianji (马店集镇)

== Chizhou ==
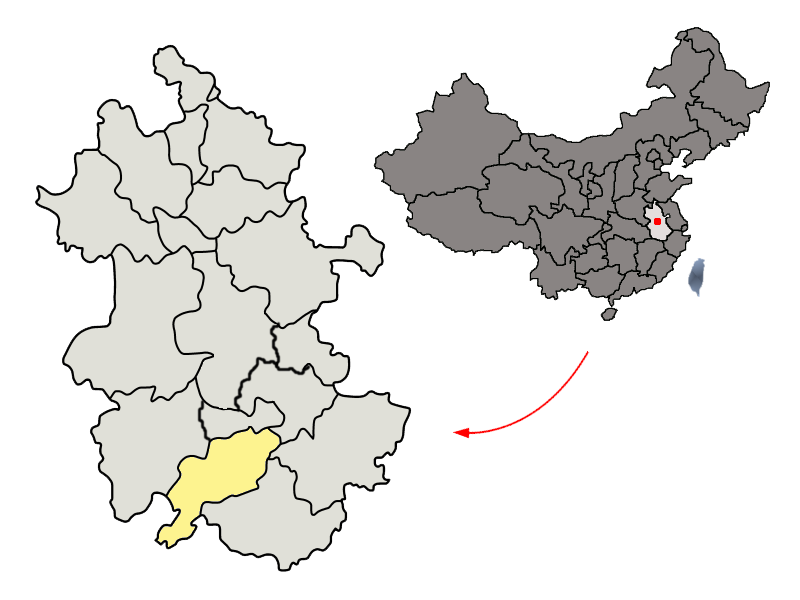
Location of Chizhou in the province

=== Guichi District ===
Subdistricts:

- Chiyang Subdistrict (池阳街道), Qiupu Subdistrict (秋浦街道), Lishan Subdistrict (里山街道), Jiangkou Subdistrict (江口街道), Maya Subdistrict (马衙街道), Dunshang Subdistrict (墩上街道), Meilong Subdistrict (梅龙街道), Qiujiang Subdistrict (秋江街道), Xinghuacun Subdistrict (杏花村街道), Qingfeng Subdistrict (清风街道), Qingxi Subdistrict (清溪街道)

Towns:

- Yinhui (殷汇镇), Niutoushan (牛头山镇), Wusha (乌沙镇), Meijie (梅街镇), Meicun (梅村镇), Tangtian (唐田镇), Pailou (牌楼镇), Tangxi (棠溪镇), Juanqiao (涓桥镇)

=== Dongzhi County ===
Towns:

- Yaodu (尧渡镇), Dongliu (东流镇), Longquan (龙泉镇), Xiangyu (香隅镇), Zhangxi (张溪镇), Yanghu (洋湖镇), Gegong (葛公镇), Dadukou (大渡口镇), Guangang (官港镇), Zhaotan (昭潭镇), Nixi (泥溪镇)

Townships:

- Muta Township (木塔乡), Huayuanli Township (花园里乡), Qingshan Township (青山乡)

=== Shitai County ===
Towns:

- Renli (仁里镇), Hengdu (横渡镇), Xianyu (仙寓镇), Qidu (七都镇), Xiaohe (小河镇), Dingxiang (丁香镇)

Townships:

- Dayan Township (大演乡), Jitan Township (矶滩乡)

Other:

- Shitai Dadukou Development Zone (石台大渡口开发区)

=== Qingyang County ===
Towns

- Rongcheng (蓉城镇), Muzhen (木镇镇), Dingqiao (丁桥镇), Xinhe (新河镇), Zhubei (朱备镇), Lingyang (陵阳镇), Yangtian (杨田镇), Miaoqian (庙前镇)

Townships

- Qiaomu Township (乔木乡), Youhua Township (酉华乡), Ducun Township (杜村乡)

== Chuzhou ==
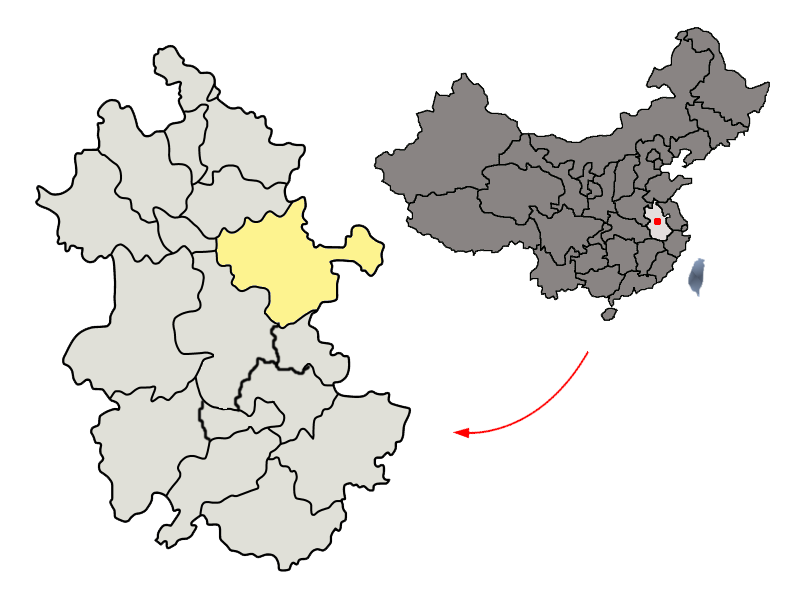
Location of Chuzhou in the province

=== Langya District ===
Subdistricts:

- Langya Subdistrict (琅琊街道), Yangzi Subdistrict (扬子街道), Qingliu Subdistrict (清流街道), Dongmen Subdistrict (东门街道), Ximen Subdistrict (西门街道), Nanmen Subdistrict (南门街道), Beimen Subdistrict (北门街道), Fenghuang Subdistrict (凤凰街道), Chengbei New Area Subdistrict (城北新区街道), Xijian Subdistrict (西涧街道)

=== Nanqiao District ===
The only subdistrict is Dawang Subdistrict (大王街道)

Towns:

- Wuyi (乌衣镇), Shahe (沙河镇), Zhangguang (章广镇), Nannigang (南泥岗镇), Daliu (大柳镇), Jiaopu (腰铺镇), Zhulong (珠龙镇), Shiji (施集镇)

=== Mingguang ===
Subdistricts:

- Mingdong Subdistrict (明东街道), Mingnan Subdistrict (明南街道), Mingxi Subdistrict (明西街道), Mingguang Subdistrict (明光街道)

Towns:

- Jianxi (涧溪镇), Guandian (管店镇), Nüshanhu (女山湖镇), Zilaiqiao (自来桥镇), Sanjie (三界镇), Shiba (石坝镇), Suxiang (苏巷镇), Zhangbaling (张八岭镇), Qiaotou (桥头镇), Gupei (古沛镇), Pancun (潘村镇), Liuxiang (柳巷镇)

The only township is Bogang Township (泊岗乡)

=== Tianchang ===
The only subdistrict is Tianchang Subdistrict (天长街道)

Towns:

- Tongcheng (铜城镇), Chajian (汊涧镇), Qinlan (秦栏镇), Datong (大通镇), Yangcun (杨村镇), Shiliang (石梁镇), Jinji (金集镇), Yeshan (冶山镇), Zhengji (郑集镇), Zhangpu (张铺镇), Xinjie (新街镇), Wanshou (万寿镇), Yongfeng (永丰镇), Renheji (仁和集镇)

=== Dingyuan County ===
Towns:

- Dingcheng (定城镇), Luqiao (炉桥镇), Zhangqiao (张桥镇), Chihe (池河镇), Jiangji (蒋集镇), Zhuwan (朱湾镇), Lianjiang (连江镇), Cang (仓镇), Jiepaiji (界牌集镇), Xisadian (西卅店镇), Yongkang (永康镇), Sangjian (桑涧镇), Sanheji (三和集镇), Outang (藕塘镇), Daqiao (大桥镇), Wuxu (吴圩镇)

Townships:

- Qilitang Township (七里塘乡), Nengren Township (能仁乡), Erlong Hui Ethnic Township (二龙回族乡), Fangang Township (范岗乡), Yanqiao Township (严桥乡), Fuxiao Township (拂晓乡)

Other areas:

- Dingyuan Economic and Technological Development Zone (安徽定远经济开发区), Dingyuan Salt Chemical Industrial Park (定远盐化工业园), Lingjiahu Farm (凌家湖农场)

=== Fengyang County ===
Towns:

- Banqiao (板桥镇), Damiao (大庙镇), Fucheng (府城镇), Guantang (官塘镇), Hongxin (红心镇), Liufu (刘府镇), Wudian (武店镇), Xiquan (西泉镇), Linhuaiguan (临淮关镇), Zaoxiang (枣巷镇), Yinjian (殷涧镇), Zongpu (总铺镇), Xiaoxihe (小溪河镇), Daxihe (大溪河镇)

The only township is Huangwan Township (黄湾乡)

=== Lai'an County ===
Towns:

- Xin'an (新安镇), Chahe (汊河镇), Banta (半塔镇), Shuikou (水口镇), Shunshan (舜山镇), Leiguan (雷官镇), Shiguan (施官镇), Daying (大英镇)

Townships:

- Yangying Township (杨郢乡), Zhangshan Township (张山乡), Dushan Township (独山乡), Sancheng Township (三城乡)

=== Quanjiao County ===
Towns:

- Xianghe (襄河镇), Wugang (武岗镇), Shizi (十字镇), Liuzhen (六镇镇), Erlangkou (二郎口镇), Xiwang (西王镇), Machang (马厂镇), Dashu (大墅镇), Shipei (石沛镇), Guhe (古河镇)

== Fuyang ==
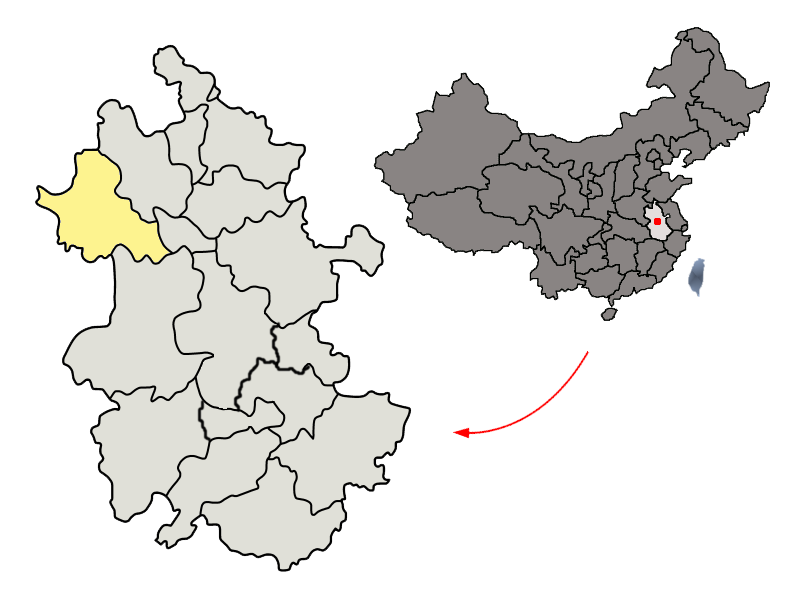
Location of Fuyang in the province

=== Yingdong District ===
Subdistricts:

- Xinhua Subdistrict (新华街道), Xiangyang Subdistrict (向阳街道), Hedong Subdistrict (河东街道)

Towns:

- Kouzi (口孜镇), Laomiao (老庙镇), Zhengwu (正午镇), Chahua (插花镇), Yuanzhai (袁寨镇), Xinwujiang (新乌江镇), Ranmiao (冉庙镇)

Townships:

- Zaozhuang Township (枣庄乡), Yanglouzi Township (杨楼孜乡)

=== Yingquan District ===
Subdistricts:

- Zhongshi Subdistrict (中市街道), Zhoupeng Subdistrict (周棚街道)

Towns:

- Renming (任明镇), Ninglaozhuang (宁老庄镇), Wenji (闻集镇), Hangliu (行流镇)

=== Yingzhou District ===
Subdistricts:

- Yingxi Subdistrict (颍西街道), Gulou Subdistrict (鼓楼街道), Qinghe Subdistrict (清河街道), Wenfeng Subdistrict (文峰街道)

Towns:

- Wangdian (王店镇), Chengji (程集镇), Xihu (西湖镇), Sanhe (三合镇), Yuanji (袁集镇), Sanshilipu (三十里铺镇), Jiulong (九龙镇)

Townships:

- Mazhai (马寨乡)

=== Jieshou ===
Subdistricts:

- Xicheng Subdistrict (西城街道), Yingnan Subdistrict (颍南街道), Dongcheng Subdistrict (东城街道)

Towns:

- Tianying (田营镇), Guji (顾集镇), Wangji (王集镇), Xinmaji (新马集镇), Lucun (芦村镇), Dahuang (大黄镇), Taomiao (陶庙镇), Yangquan (阳泉镇), Shuzhuang (舒庄镇), Daiqiao (代桥镇), Guangwu (光武镇), Zhuanji (砖集镇)

Townships:

- Renzhai Township (任寨乡), Jinzhai Township (靳寨乡), Bingji Township (邴集乡)

=== Funan County ===
Towns:

- Fangji (方集镇), Zhonggang (中岗镇), Chaiji (柴集镇), Xincun (新村镇), Santa (三塔镇), Zhuzhai (朱寨镇), Liugou (柳沟镇), Zhaoji (赵集镇), Tianji (田集镇), Miaoji (苗集镇), Huanggang (黄岗镇), Jiaobei (焦陂镇), Zhangzhai (张寨镇), Wangshi (王石镇), Dicheng (地城镇), Hongheqiao (洪河桥镇), Wangjiaba (王家坝镇), Wanghua (王化镇), Caoji (曹集镇), Lucheng (鹿城镇), Huilong (会龙镇)

Townships:

- Wangdianzi Township (王店孜乡), Xutang Township (许堂乡), Duanying Township (段郢乡), Gongqiao Township (公桥乡), Longwang Township (龙王乡), Yuji Township (于集乡), Laoguan Township (老观乡), Gaotai Township (郜台乡)

=== Linquan County ===
Towns:

- Chengguan (城关镇), Yangqiao (杨桥镇), Tongcheng (同城镇), Tanpeng (谭棚镇), Laoji (老集镇), Huaji (滑集镇), Lüzhai (吕寨镇), Danqiao (单桥镇), Changguan (长官镇), Songji (宋集镇), Zhangxin (张新镇), Aiting (艾亭镇), Chenji (陈集镇), Weizhai (韦寨镇), Yingxian (迎仙镇), Wadian (瓦店镇), Jiangzhai (姜寨镇), Miaocha (庙岔镇), Huangling (黄岭镇), Baimiao (白庙镇), Guanmiao (关庙镇)

Townships:

- Niuzhuang Township (牛庄乡), Gaotang Township (高塘乡), Fanxingji Township (范兴集乡), Tupi Township (土陂乡), Xieji Township (谢集乡), Yangxiaojie Township (杨小街乡), Taolao Township (陶老乡), Tianqiao Township (田桥乡), Zhangying Township (张营乡), Pangying Township (庞营乡)

=== Taihe County ===
Towns:

- Chengguan (城关镇), Jiuxian (旧县镇), Shuizhen (税镇镇), Pitiaosun (皮条孙镇), Yuanqiang (原墙镇), Niqiu (倪邱镇), Lixing (李兴镇), Daxin (大新镇), Xiaokou (肖口镇), Guanji (关集镇), Santa (三塔镇), Shuangfu (双浮镇), Caimiao (蔡庙镇), Santang (三堂镇), Miaolaoji (苗老集镇), Zhaomiao (赵庙镇), Gongji (宫集镇), Fentai (坟台镇), Hongshan (洪山镇), Qingqian (清浅镇), Wuxing (五星镇), Gaomiao (高庙镇), Sangying (桑营镇), Damiaoji (大庙集镇), Ruanqiao (阮桥镇), Shuangmiao (双庙镇)

Townships:

- Huzong Township (胡总乡), Zhaoji Township (赵集乡), Guomiao Township (郭庙乡), Maji Township (马集乡), Erlang Township (二郎乡)

=== Yingshang County ===
Towns:

- Shencheng (慎城镇), Xieqiao (谢桥镇), Nanzhao (南照镇), Yanghu (杨湖镇), Liushipu (六十铺镇), Jiangkou (江口镇), Runhe (润河镇), Xinji (新集镇), Gengpeng (耿棚镇), Bangang (半岗镇), Wanggang (王岗镇), Xiaqiao (夏桥镇), Chenqiao (陈桥镇), Huangqiao (黄桥镇), Jiangdianzi (江店孜镇), Digou (迪沟镇), Balihe (八里河镇), Xisanshipu (西三十铺镇), Shibalipu (十八里铺镇), Lukou (鲁口镇), Hongxin (红心镇)

Townships:

- Jianyi Township (建颍乡), Shengtang Township (盛堂乡), Liuji Township (刘集乡), Gucheng Township (古城乡), Huangba Township (黄坝乡), Wushipu Township (五十铺乡), Guantun Township (关屯乡), Saijian Hui Ethnic Township (赛涧回族乡)

== Huaibei ==
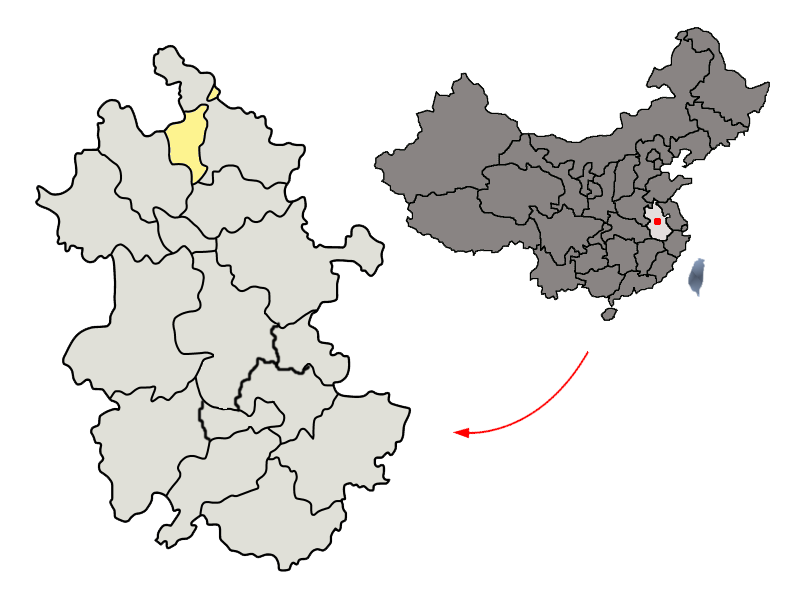
Location of Huaibei in the province

=== Duji District ===
Subdistricts:

- Gaoyue Subdistrict (高岳街道), Kuangshanji Subdistrict (矿山集街道)

Towns:

- Duanyuan (段园镇), Shuoli (朔里镇), Shitai (石台镇)

=== Lieshan District ===
Subdistricts:

- Yangzhuang Subdistrict (杨庄街道), Renlou Subdistrict (任楼街道), Linhaitong Subdistrict (临海童街道), Baishan Subdistrict (百善街道)

Towns:

- Songting (宋瞳镇), Lieshan Town (烈山镇), Gurao (古饶镇)

=== Xiangshan District ===
Subdistricts:

- Renxu Subdistrict (任圩街道), Xiangnan Subdistrict (相南街道), Renminlu Subdistrict (人民路街道), Quyang Subdistrict (曲阳街道), Dongqu Subdistrict (东区街道), Dongshan Subdistrict (东山街道), Sandikou Subdistrict (三堤口街道), Xiqu Subdistrict (西区街道), Liuqiao Subdistrict (刘桥街道), Nanli Subdistrict (南黎街道), Dong Subdistrict (东街道), Xi Subdistrict (西街道)

The only town is Qugou (渠沟镇)

=== Suixi County ===
Towns:

- Suixi Town (濉溪镇), Liuqiao (刘桥镇), Shuangduiji (双堆集镇), Baishan (百善镇), Nanping (南坪镇), Wugou (五沟镇), Linhuan (临涣镇), Hancun (韩村镇), Tiefo (铁佛镇), Sunting (孙曈镇)

The only township is Sibo Township (四卜乡)

== Huainan ==
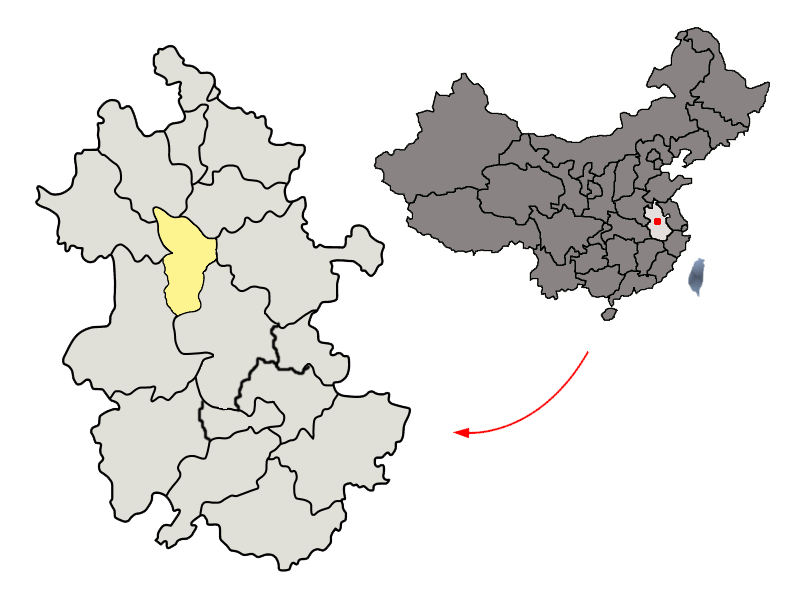
Location of Huainan in the province

=== Bagongshan District ===
Subdistricts:

- Xinzhuangzi Subdistrict (新庄孜街道), Tubazi Subdistrict (土坝孜街道), Bijiagang Subdistrict (毕家岗街道)

Towns:

- Bagongshan Town (八公山镇), Shanwang (山王镇)

Other:

- Miaoshan Forestry (妙山林场)

=== Datong District ===
The only subdistrict is Datong Subdistrict (大通街道)

Towns:

- Shangyao (上窑镇), Luohe (洛河镇), Jiulonggang (九龙岗镇)

The only township is Kongdian Township (孔店乡)

=== Panji District ===
The only subdistrict is Tianji Subdistrict (田集街道)

Towns:

- Panji Town (潘集镇), Luji (芦集镇), Pingxu (平圩镇), Gaohuang (高皇镇), Jiahe (架河镇), Nihe (泥河镇)

Townships:

- Hetuan Township (贺瞳乡), Jiagou Township (夹沟乡), Qiji Township (祁集乡), Gugou Hui Ethnic Township (古沟回族乡)

=== Tianjia'an District ===
Subdistricts:

- Dongshan Subdistrict (洞山街道), Huaibin Subdistrict (淮滨街道), Tiandong Subdistrict (田东街道), Longquan Subdistrict (龙泉街道), Guoqing Subdistrict (国庆街道), Chaoyang Subdistrict (朝阳街道), Quanshan Subdistrict (泉山街道), Gongyuan Subdistrict (公园街道), Xinhuai Subdistrict (新淮街道)

=== Xiejiaji District ===
Subdistricts:

- Xiejiaji Subdistrict (谢家集街道), Caijiagang Subdistrict (蔡家岗街道), Lixin Subdistrict (立新街道), Pingshan Subdistrict (平山街道), Xiesancun Subdistrict (谢三村街道)

Towns:

- Wangfenggang (望峰岗镇), Liyingzi (李郢孜镇), Tangshan (唐山镇), Yanggong (杨公镇)

Townships:

- Sunmiao Township (孙庙乡), Gudui Hui Ethnic Township (孤堆回族乡)

=== Fengtai County ===
Towns:

- Chengguan (城关镇), Xinji (新集镇), Yuezhangji (岳张集镇), Zhumadian (朱马店镇), Guqiao (顾桥镇), Maoji (毛集镇), Xiaji (夏集镇), Guiji (桂集镇), Jiaoganghu (焦岗湖镇), Fenghuang (凤凰镇)

Townships:

- Guandian Township (关店乡), Gudian Township (古店乡), Shangtang Township (尚塘乡), Liuji Township (刘集乡), Dingji Township (丁集乡), Qianmiao Township (钱庙乡), Yangcun Township (杨村乡), Daxingji Township (大兴集乡), Lichong Hui Ethnic Township (李冲回族乡)

=== Shou County ===
Towns:

- Shouchun (寿春镇), Shuangqiao (双桥镇), Liugang (刘岗镇), Jiangou (涧沟镇), Banqiao (板桥镇), Baoyi (保义镇), Anfeng (安丰镇), Anfengtang (安丰塘镇), Xiaodian (小甸镇), Dashun (大顺镇), Zhongxing (众兴镇), Yanliu (炎刘镇), Wabu (瓦埠镇), Zhengyangguan (正阳关镇), Shikou (堰口镇), Shuangmiaoji (双庙集镇), Yinxian (隐贤镇), Fengzhuang (丰庄镇), Sanjue (三觉镇), Cha'an (茶庵镇), Yinghe (迎河镇)

Townships:

- Zhangli Township (张李乡), Bagongshan Township (八公山乡), Yaokou Township (窑口乡), Taodian Hui Ethnic Township (陶店回族乡)

== Huangshan City ==
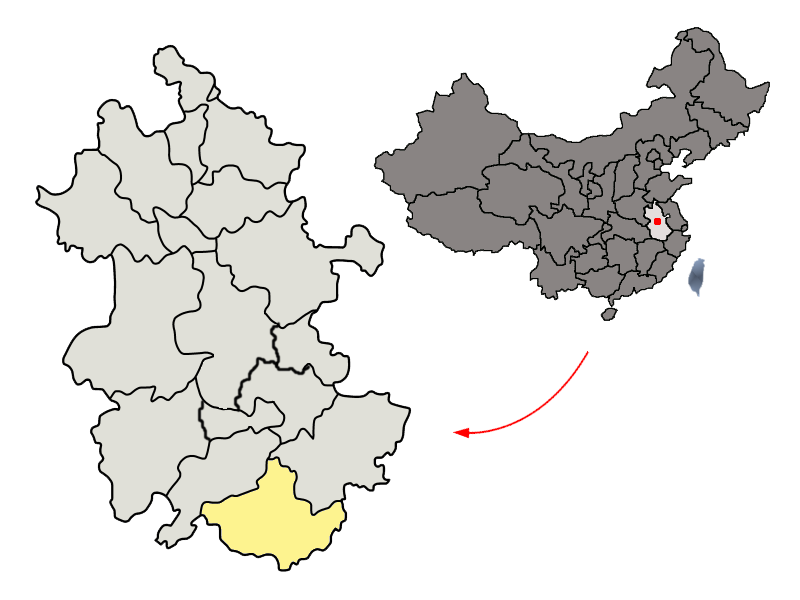
Location of Huangshan City in the province

=== Huangshan District ===
The only subdistrict is Xincheng Subdistrict (新城街道)

Towns:

- Gantang (甘棠镇), Xianyuan (仙源镇), Taipinghu (太平湖镇), Gengcheng (耿城镇), Tanjiaqiao (谭家桥镇), Tangkou (汤口镇), Sankou (三口镇), Jiaocun (焦村镇), Wushi (乌石镇)

Townships:

- Xinfeng Township (新丰乡), Xinhua Township (新华乡), Yongfeng Township (永丰乡), Longmen Township (龙门乡), Xinming Township (新明乡)

=== Huizhou District ===
Towns:

- Yansi (岩寺镇), Xixinan (西溪南镇), Qiankou (潜口镇), Chengkan (呈坎镇)

Townshisp:

- Qiashe Township (洽舍乡), Fuxi Township (富溪乡), Yangcun Township (杨村乡)

=== Tunxi District ===
Subdistricts:

- Yudong Subdistrict (昱东街道), Yuzhong Subdistrict (昱中街道), Yuxi Subdistrict (昱西街道), Laojie Subdistrict (老街街道)

Towns:

- Tunguang (屯光镇), Liyang (黎阳镇), Yanghu (阳湖镇), Yiqi (奕棋镇), Xintan (新潭镇)

=== Qimen County ===
Towns:

- Qishan (祁山镇), Pingli (平里镇), Jinzipai (金字牌镇), Shanli (闪里镇), Likou (历口镇), Xiaolukou (小路口镇), Anling (安凌镇), Fufeng (凫峰镇)

Townships:

- Rongkou Township (溶口乡), Tafang Township (塔坊乡), Luxi Township (芦溪乡), Guxi Township (古溪乡), Xin'an Township (新安乡), Ruokeng Township (箬坑乡), Baixi Township (柏溪乡), Qihong Township (祁红乡), Datan Township (大坦乡), Zhukou Township (渚口乡)

=== She County ===
Towns:

- Huicheng (徽城镇), Xucun (许村镇), Shendu (深度镇), Xitou (溪头镇), Chakou (岔口镇), Xiakeng (霞坑镇), Bei'an (北岸镇), Jiekou (街口镇), Guilin (桂林镇), Fu'ai (富堨镇), Zhengcun (郑村镇), Wangcun (王村镇), Qizili (杞梓里镇)

Townships:

- Hangkou Township (坑口乡), Jinchuan Township (金川乡), Changxi Township (昌溪乡), Sanyang Township (三阳乡), Changgai Township (长陔乡), Xiaochuan Township (小川乡), Xiongcun Township (雄村乡), Shangfeng Township (上丰乡), Wuyang Township (武阳乡), Sencun Township (森村乡), Shimen Township (石门乡), Huangtian Township (璜田乡), Shaolian Township (绍濂乡), Shishi Township (狮石乡), Xinxikou Township (新溪口乡)

=== Xiuning County ===
Towns:

- Haiyang (海阳镇), Qiyunshan (齐云山镇), Wan'an (万安镇), Wucheng (五城镇), Lantian (兰田镇), Donglinxi (东临溪镇), Xikou (溪口镇), Liukou (流口镇), Wangcun (汪村镇), Shangshan (商山镇)

Townships:

- Weiqiao Township (渭桥乡), Shandou Township (山斗乡), Lingnan Township (岭南乡), Yuanfang Township (源芳乡), Yucun Township (榆村乡), Huangjian Township (璜尖乡), Longtian Township (龙田乡), Baiji Township (白际乡), Chenxia Township (陈霞乡), Banqiao Township (板桥乡), Hecheng Township (鹤城乡)

=== Yi County ===
Towns:

- Biyang (碧阳镇), Jilian (际联镇), Yuting (渔亭镇)

Townships:

- Longjiang Township (龙江乡), Bishan Township (碧山乡), Xiwu Township (西武乡), Kecun Township (柯村乡), Meixi Township (美溪乡), Hongtan Township (宏潭乡), Dongyuan Township (东源乡), Sixi Township (泗溪乡), Hongxing Township (洪星乡)

== Lu'an ==
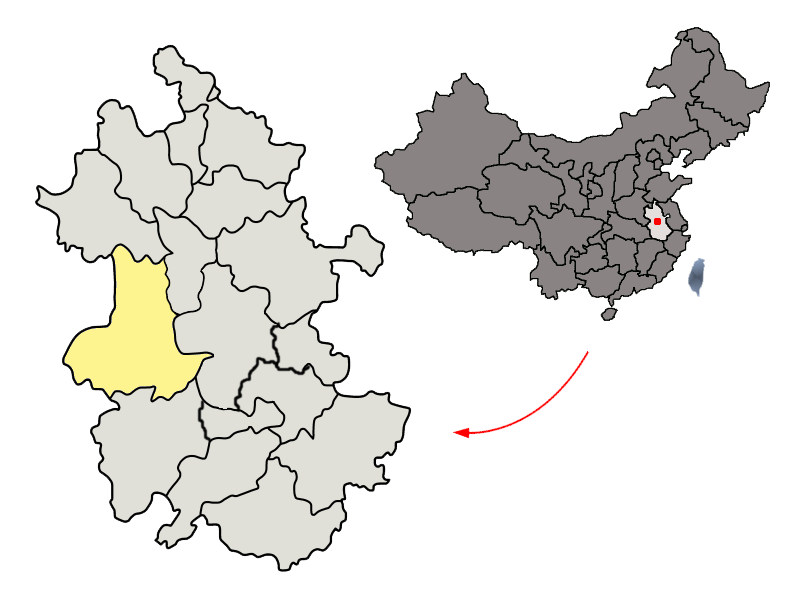
Location of Lu'an in the province

=== Jin'an District ===
Subdistricts:

- Wangcheng Subdistrict (望城街道), Qingshuihe Subdistrict (清水河街道), Zhongshi Subdistrict (中市街道), Sanliqiao Subdistrict (三里桥街道), Dongshi Subdistrict (东市街道)

Towns:

- Zhangdian (张店镇), Maotanchang (毛坦厂镇), Shiqiao (施桥镇), Chunshu (椿树镇), Dongqiao (东桥镇), Sungang (孙岗镇), Matou (马头镇), Donghekou (东河口镇), Muchang (木厂镇), Sanshipu (三十铺镇), Shuanghe (双河镇)

Townships:

- Zhongdian Township (中店乡), Chengbei Township (城北乡), Xianshengdian Township (先生店乡), Weidong Township (渭东乡), Wengdun Township (翁墩乡), Hengtanggang Township (横塘岗乡)

=== Yeji District ===
Towns:

- Yeji (叶集镇), Sanyuan (三原镇)

Townships:

- Sungang (孙岗乡)

=== Yu'an District ===
Subdistricts:

- Gulou Subdistrict (鼓楼街道), Xishi Subdistrict (西市街道), Xiaohuashan Subdistrict (小华山街道)

Towns:

- Subu (苏埠镇), Hanbaidu (韩摆渡镇), Xin'an (新安镇), Shunhe (顺河镇), Shipozhuang (石婆庄镇), Dushan (独山镇), Chengnan (城南镇), Dingji (丁集镇), Guzhen (固镇镇), Xuji (徐集镇), Fenlukou (分路口镇), Jiangjiadian (江家店镇)

Townships:

- Danwang Township (单王乡), Qingshan Township (青山乡), Shibanchong Township (石板冲乡), Xihekou Township (西河口乡), Pingqiao Township (平桥乡), Luoji Township (罗集乡)

=== Huoqiu County ===
Towns:

- Chengguan (城关镇), Yaoli (姚李镇), Hongji (洪集镇), Caomiao (曹庙镇), Zhongxingji (众兴集镇), Xiadian (夏店镇), Wulong (乌龙镇), Huhu (户胡镇), Longtan (龙潭镇), Shidian (石店镇), Fengjing (冯井镇), Linshui (临水镇), Gaotang (高塘镇), Chalu (岔路镇), Xindian (新店镇), Mengji (孟集镇), Huayuan (花园镇), Zhouji (周集镇), Madian (马店镇), Changji (长集镇), Hekou (河口镇), Yeji (叶集镇)

Townships:

- Songdian Township (宋店乡), Sanliu Township (三流乡), Chengxihu Township (城西湖乡), Linhuaigang Township (临淮岗乡), Shaogang Township (邵岗乡), Bailian Township (白莲乡), Fanqiao Township (范桥乡), Wangdailiu Township (王截流乡), Panji Township (潘集乡), Pengta Township (彭塔乡), Fengling Township (冯瓴乡)

=== Huoshan County ===
Towns:

- Hengshan (衡山镇), Danjiamiao (但家庙镇), Foziling (佛子岭镇), Heishidu (黑石渡镇), Luo'erling (落儿岭镇), Xiafuqiao (下符桥镇), Shangtushi (上土市镇), Yu'erjie (与儿街镇), Manshuihe (漫水河镇), Mozitan (磨子潭镇), Zhufo'an (诸佛庵镇), Dahuaping (大化坪镇)

Townships:

- Taipingfan Township (太平畈乡), Dongxixi Township (东西溪乡), Danlongsi Township (单龙寺乡), Taiyang Township (太阳乡)

=== Jinzhai County ===
Towns:

- Meishan (梅山镇), Shuanghe (双河镇), Nanxi (南溪镇), Gubei (古碑镇), Qingshan (青山镇), Tiantangzhai (天堂寨镇), Wujiadian (吴家店镇), Mabu (麻埠镇), Tangjiahui (汤家汇镇), Banzhuyuan (斑竹园镇), Yanzihe (燕子河镇)

Townships:

- Baitafan Township (白塔畈乡), Youfangdian Township (油坊店乡), Huaishuwan Township (槐树湾乡), Huashi Township (花石乡), Shahe Township (沙河乡), Taoling Township (桃岭乡), Tiechong Township (铁冲乡), Changling Township (长岭乡), Zhangchong Township (张冲乡), Guanmiao Township (关庙乡), Guoziyuan Township (果子园乡), Quanjun Township (全军乡)

=== Shucheng County ===
Towns:

- Chengguan (城关镇), Taoxi (桃溪镇), Qianrenqiao (千人桥镇), Hangbu (杭埠镇), Baishenmiao (百神庙镇), Wuxian (五显镇), Nangang (南港镇), Shucha (舒茶镇), Ganchahe (干汊河镇), Wanfohu (万佛湖镇), Shanqi (山七镇), Xiaotian (晓天镇), Tangchi (汤池镇), Hepeng (河棚镇), Zhangmuqiao (张母桥镇)

Townships:

- Chunqiu Township (春秋乡), Bolin Township (柏林乡), Quedian Township (阙店乡), Tangshu Township (棠树乡), Luzhen Township (庐镇乡), Gaofeng Township (高峰乡)

== Ma'anshan ==
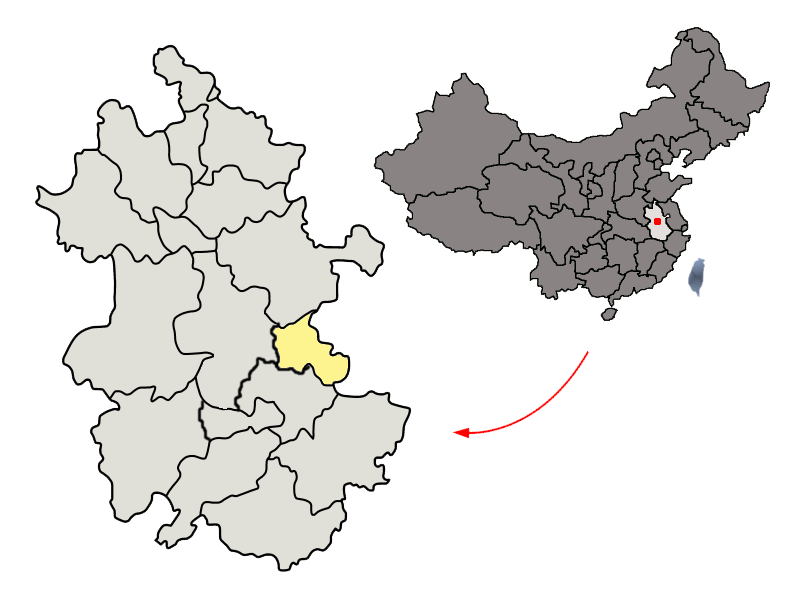
Location of Ma'anshan in the province

=== Huashan District ===
Subdistricts:

- Huoli Subdistrict (霍里街道), Shatang Road Subdistrict (沙塘路街道), Jiefang Road Subdistrict (解放路街道), Hudong Road Subdistrict (湖东路街道), Taoyuan Road Subdistrict (桃源路街道)

=== Jinjiazhuang District ===
Subdistricts:

- Jinjiazhuang Subdistrict (金家庄街道), Tangxi Subdistrict (塘西街道), Cihu Subdistrict (慈湖街道), Jiangbian Subdistrict (江边街道)

The only township is Cihu Township (慈湖乡)

=== Yushan District ===
Subdistricts:

- Pinghu Subdistrict (平湖街道), Anmin Subdistrict (安民街道), Yushan Subdistrict (雨山街道), Caishi Subdistrict (采石街道)

Towns:

- Xiangshan (向山镇), Yintang (银塘镇)

The only township is Jiashan Township (佳山乡)

=== Dangtu County ===
Towns:

- Gushu (姑孰镇), Xinshi (新市镇), Taibai (太白镇), Bowang (博望镇), Huangchi (黄池镇), Danyang (丹阳镇), Tangnan (塘南镇), Wuxi (乌溪镇), Shiqiao (石桥镇), Huhe (护河镇), Huyang (湖阳镇), Niandou (年陡镇)

Townships:

- Jiangxin Township (江心乡), Dalong Township (大陇乡)

=== Hanshan County ===
Towns:

- Huanfeng (环峰镇), Yuncao (运漕镇), Xianzong (仙踪镇), Qingxi (清溪镇), Lintou (林头镇), Tongzha (铜闸镇), Taochang (陶厂镇), Zhaoguan (昭关镇)

=== He County ===
Towns:

- Liyang (历阳镇), Shenxiang (沈巷镇), Baiqiao (白桥镇), Laoqiao (姥桥镇), Gongqiao (功桥镇), Xibu (西埠镇), Xiangquan (香泉镇), Wujiang (乌江镇), Shanhou (善厚镇), Shiyang (石杨镇)

== Suzhou ==
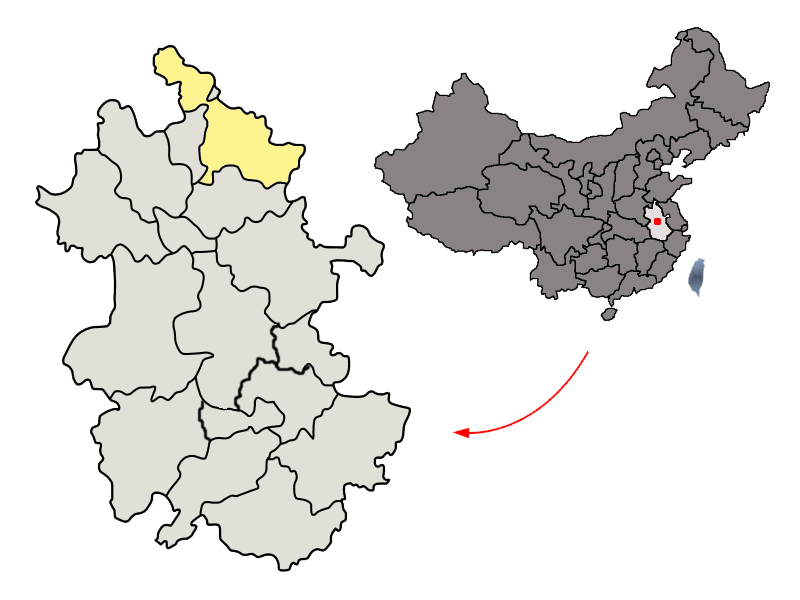
Location of Suzhou in the province

=== Yongqiao District ===
Subdistricts:

- Daodong Subdistrict (道东街道), Dongguan Subdistrict (东关街道), Xiguan Subdistrict (西关街道), Nanguan Subdistrict (南关街道), Beiguan Subdistrict (北关街道), Bianhe Subdistrict (汴河街道), Sanliwan Subdistrict (三里湾街道), Tuohe Subdistrict (沱河街道), Yongqiao Subdistrict (埇桥街道), Chengdong Subdistrict (城东街道), Chengxi Subdistrict (城西街道)

Towns:

- Caocun (曹村镇), Chulan (褚兰镇), Fuli (符离镇), Dadian (大店镇), Daying (大营镇), Huidian (灰古镇), Jiagou (夹沟镇), Langan (栏杆镇), Qixian (蕲县镇), Luling (芦岭镇), Shichun (时春镇), Yaoyuan (姚园镇), Xisipo (西寺坡镇), Yong'an (永安镇), Zhuxianzhuang (朱仙庄镇)

Townships:

- Beiyangzhai Township (北杨寨乡), Haohe Township (蒿河乡), Miao'an Township (苗庵乡), Jieji Township (解集乡), Shunhe Township (顺河乡), Taogou Township (桃沟乡), Xi'erpu Township (西二铺乡), Yangzhuang Township (杨庄乡), Yongzhen Township (永镇乡), Zhihe Township (支河乡)

=== Dangshan County ===
Towns:

- Dangcheng (砀城镇), Lizhuang (李庄镇), Xuanmiao (玄庙镇), Guanzhuangba (官庄坝镇), Zhouzhai (周寨镇), Caozhuang (曹庄镇), Guandimiao (关帝庙镇), Liangli (良梨镇), Zhulou (朱楼镇), Chengzhuang (程庄镇), Wenzhuang (文庄镇), Xin'anmen (西南门镇), Tangzhai (唐寨镇), Geji (葛集镇)

Townships:

- Huanglou Township (黄楼乡), Zhaotun Township (赵屯乡), Quanji Township (权集乡), Liu'anlou Township (刘暗楼乡)

=== Lingbi County ===
Towns:

- Lingcheng (灵城镇), Weiji (韦集镇), Huangwan (黄湾镇), Louzhuang (娄庄镇), Yinji (尹集镇), Youji (尤集镇), Yangtuan (杨疃镇), Xialou (夏楼镇), Chaoyang (朝阳镇), Yugou (渔沟镇), Gaolou (高楼镇), Fengmiao (冯庙镇), Huigou (浍沟镇)

Townships:

- Xiangyang Township (向阳乡), Zhuji Township (朱集乡), Dalu Township (大路乡), Damiao Township (大庙乡), Chantang Township (禅堂乡), Yuji Township (虞姬乡)

=== Si County ===
Towns:

- Sicheng (泗城镇), Pingshan (屏山镇), Huangxu (黄圩镇), Dazhuang (大庄镇), Shantou (山头镇), Liuxu (刘圩镇), Heita (黑塔镇), Caomiao (草庙镇), Caogou (草沟镇), Dunji (墩集镇), Dinghu (丁湖镇), Changgou (长沟镇)

Townships:

- Dalukou Township (大路口乡), Dayang Township (大杨乡), Wafang Township (瓦坊乡)

=== Xiao County ===
Towns:

- Longcheng (龙城镇), Huangkou (黄口镇), Dingli (丁里镇), Xinzhuang (新庄镇), Qinglong (青龙镇), Majing (马井镇), Baitu (白土镇), Datun (大屯镇), Dulou (杜楼镇), Guanqiao (官桥镇), Yanglou (杨楼镇), Liutao (刘套镇), Wangzhai (王寨镇), Yanji (闫集镇), Yonggu (永固镇), Zhangzhuangzhai (张庄寨镇), Zhaozhuang (赵庄镇), Zulou (祖楼镇)

Townships:

- Shilin Township (石林乡), Shengquan Township (圣泉乡), Jiudian Township (酒店乡), Zhuangli Township (庄里乡), Sunweizi Township (孙圩孜乡)

== Tongling ==
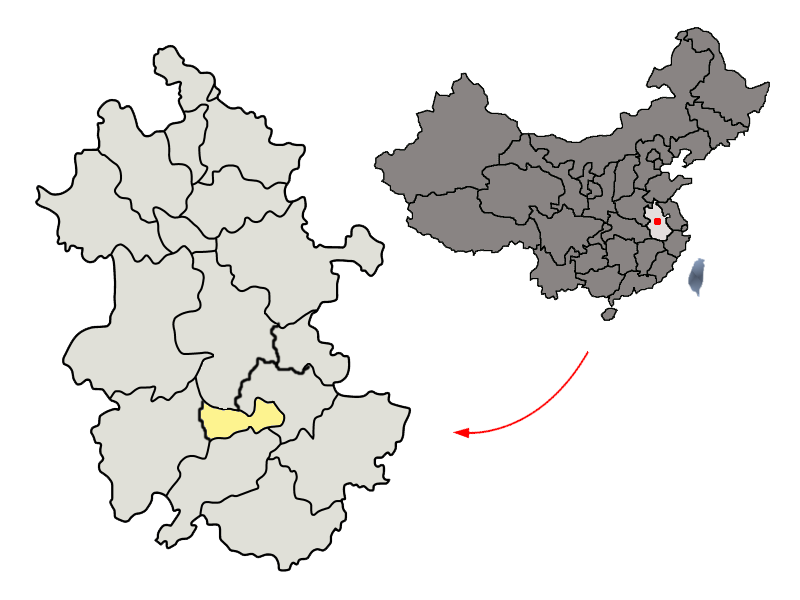
Location of Tongling in the province

=== Jiaoqu ===
The only subdistrict is Qiaonan Subdistrict (桥南街道)

Towns:

- Datong (大通镇), Tongshan (铜山镇)

The only township is Huihe Township (灰河乡)

Other:

- Anqing Mining District Office (安庆矿区办事处)

=== Shizishan District ===
Subdistricts:

- Shizishan Subdistrict (狮子山街道), Xinmiao Subdistrict (新庙街道), Cuihu Subdistrict (翠湖街道), Fenghuangshan Subdistrict (凤凰山街道), Dongjiao Subdistrict (东郊街道)

The only town is Xihu (西湖镇)

Other:

- Shizishan Economic Development Zone (狮子山经济开发区)

=== Tongguanshan District ===
Subdistricts:

- Changjiang Road Subdistrict (长江路街道), Shicheng Road Subdistrict (石城路街道), Tongguanshan Subdistrict (铜官山街道), Yangjiashan Subdistrict (杨家山街道), Saobagou Subdistrict (扫把沟街道), Henggang Subdistrict (横港街道)

=== Tongling County ===
Towns:

- Wusong (五松镇), Shun'an (顺安镇), Zhongming (钟鸣镇), Tianmen (天门镇)

Townships:

- Donggeng Township (东联乡), Xigeng Township (西联乡), Xuba Township (胥坝乡), Laozhou Township (老洲乡)

== Wuhu ==
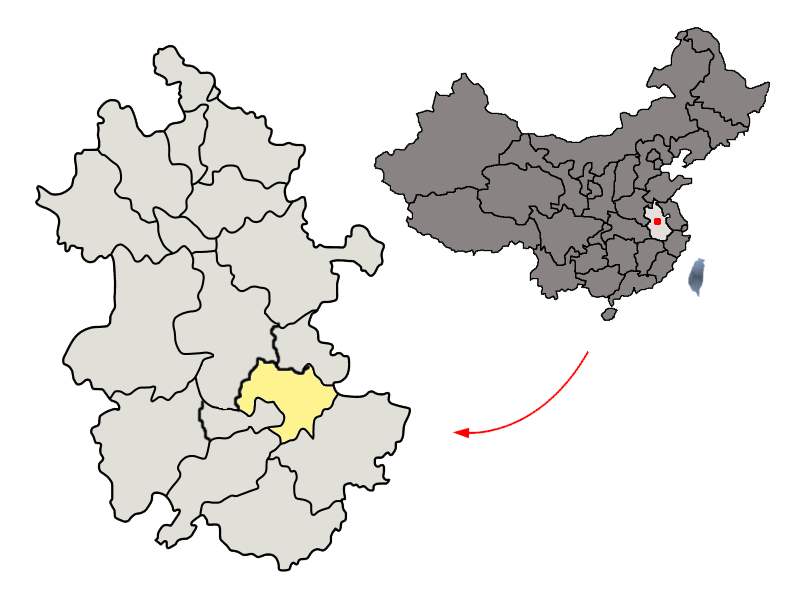
Location of Wuhu in the province

=== Jinghu District ===
Subdistricts:

- Beijing Road Subdistrict (北京路街道), Zhelu Subdistrict (赭麓街道), Jinghu Subdistrict (镜湖街道), Jihe Subdistrict (吉和街道), Zheshan Subdistrict (赭山街道), Gejishan Subdistrict (弋矶山街道), Tingtang Subdistrict (汀棠街道), Tianmenshan Subdistrict (天门山街道), Beimen Subdistrict (北门街道), Dongmen Subdistrict (东门街道), Jingshan Subdistrict (荆山街道)

The only town is Fangcun (方村镇)

=== Jiujiang District ===
Subdistricts:

- Qingshui Subdistrict (清水街道), Guandou Subdistrict (官陡街道), Wanli Subdistrict (湾里街道), Siheshan Subdistrict (四褐山街道), Yuxijiang Subdistrict (裕溪江街道)

Other:

- Jiujiang Economic and Technological Development Zone (鸠江经济技术开发区)

=== Sanshan District ===
Subdistricts:

- Sanshan Subdistrict (三山街道), Baoding Subdistrict (保定街道), Longhu Subdistrict (龙湖街道)

The only town is Eqiao (峨桥镇)

=== Yijiang District ===
Subdistricts:

- Yijiangqiao Subdistrict (弋江桥街道), Limin Road Subdistrict (利民路街道), Matang Subdistrict (马塘街道), Lugang Subdistrict (瀂港街道), Huolong Subdistrict (火龙街道), South Zhongshan Road Subdistrict (中山南路街道), Baima Subdistrict (白马街道)

=== Fanchang County ===
Towns:

- Fanyang (繁阳镇), Eshan (峨山镇), Pingpu (平铺镇), Xingang (新港镇), Suncun (孙村镇), Huogang (荻港镇)

=== Nanling County ===
Towns:

- Jishan (籍山镇), Yijiang (弋江镇), Xuzhen (许镇镇), Sanli (三里镇), Hewan (何湾镇), Gongshan (工山镇), Jiafa (家发镇), Yandun (烟墩镇), Jiafa (家发镇)

=== Wuhu County ===
Towns:

- Wanzhi (湾址镇), Liulang (六郎镇), Taoxin (陶辛镇), Hongyang (红杨镇), Huaqiao (花桥镇)

=== Wuwei County ===
Towns:

- Wucheng (无城镇), Xiang'an (襄安镇), Erba (二坝镇), Tanggou (汤沟镇), Dougou (陡沟镇), Shijian (石涧镇), Yanqiao (严桥镇), Kaicheng (开城镇), Shushan (蜀山镇), Niubu (牛埠镇), Liudu (刘渡镇), Yaogou (姚沟镇), Nicha (泥汊镇), Baimao (白茆镇), Fudu (福渡镇), Gaogou (高沟镇), Quantang (泉塘镇), Hongmiao (红庙镇), Hedian (赫店镇)

Townships:

- Hemao Township (鹤毛乡), Hongxiang Township (洪巷乡), Kunshan Township (昆山乡), Shilidun Township (十里墩乡)

== Xuancheng ==
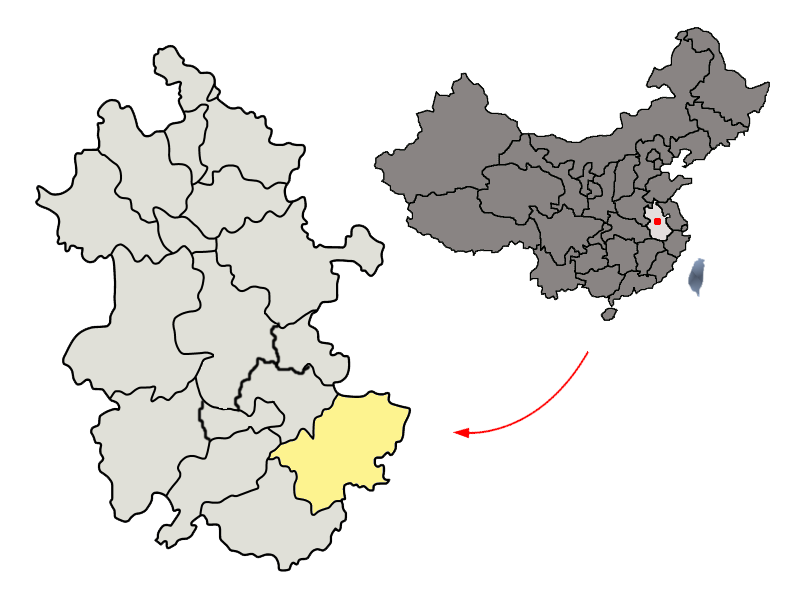
Location of Xuancheng in the province

=== Xuanzhou District ===
Subdistricts:

- Shuangqiao Subdistrict (双桥街道), Jichuan Subdistrict (济川街道), Chengjiang Subdistrict (澄江街道), Aofeng Subdistrict (鳌峰街道), Xilin Subdistrict (西林街道), Jingtingshan Subdistrict (敬亭山街道), Feicai Subdistrict (飞彩街道)

Towns:

- Shuiyang (水阳镇), Liqiao (狸桥镇), Shencun (沈村镇), Guquan (古泉镇), Honglin (洪林镇), Hanting (寒亭镇), Wenchang (文昌镇), Xikou (溪口镇), Zhouwang (周王镇), Xintian (新田镇), Yangliu (杨柳镇), Shuidong (水东镇), Xiangyang (向阳镇), Sunbu (孙埠镇)

Towns:

- Zhuqiao Township (朱桥乡), Yangxian Township (养贤乡), Wuxing Township (五星乡), Jinba Township (金坝乡), Huangdu Township (黄渡乡)

=== Ningguo ===
Subdistricts:

- Xijin Subdistrict (西津街道), Heli Subdistrict (河沥街道), Nanshan Subdistrict (南山街道), Wangxi Subdistrict (汪溪街道), Zhufeng Subdistrict (竹峰街道), Tianhu Subdistrict (天湖街道)

Towns:

- Zhongxi (中溪镇), Gangkou (港口镇), Ningdun (宁墩镇), Xiaxi (霞西镇), Xianxia (仙霞镇), Meilin (梅林镇), Jialu (甲路镇), Hule (胡乐镇)

Townships:

- Yunti Township (云梯乡), Nanji Township (南极乡), Wanjia Township (万家乡), Qinglong Township (青龙乡), Fantang Township (方塘乡)

=== Guangde County ===
Towns:

- Taozhou (桃州镇), Xinhang (新杭镇), Qiucun (邱村镇), Baidian (柏垫镇), Shijie (誓节镇)

Townships:

- Lucun Township (卢村乡), Sihe Township (四合乡), Yangtan Township (杨滩乡), Dongting Township (东亭乡)

=== Langxi County ===
Towns:

- Nanfeng (南丰镇), Xinfa (新发镇), Meizhu (梅渚镇), Taocheng (涛城镇), Shizi (十字镇), Biqiao (毕桥镇), Dongxia (东夏镇), Jianping (建平镇)

Townships:

- Xingfu Township (幸福乡), Feili Township (飞里乡), Yaocun Township (姚村乡), Lingda Township (凌笪乡)

=== Jing County ===
Towns:

- Maolin (茂林镇), Langqiao (榔桥镇), Huangcun (黄村镇), Dingjiaqiao (顶家桥镇), Jingchuan (泾川镇), Caicun (蔡村镇), Yunling (云岭镇)

Townships:

- Changqiao Township (昌桥乡), Tingxi Township (汀溪乡)

=== Jixi County ===
Towns:

- Huayang (华阳镇), Chang'an (长安镇), Fuling (伏岭镇), Jinsha (金沙镇), Shangzhuang (上庄镇), Yangxi (扬溪镇), Linxi (临溪镇), Yingzhou (瀛洲镇)

Townships:

- Jiapeng Township (家朋乡), Jingzhou Township (荆州乡), Banqiaotou Township (板桥头乡)

=== Jingde County ===
Towns:

- Jingyang (旌阳镇), Baidi (白地镇), Sanxi (三溪镇), Miaoshou (庙首镇), Caijiaqiao (蔡家桥镇)

Townships:

- Banshu Township (版书乡), Yucun Township (俞村乡), Suncun Township (孙村乡), Xinglong Township (兴隆乡), Yunle Township (云乐乡)
