= 2021 Anqing stabbing =

Mass stabbing in Anqing, China

2021 Anqing stabbing attack
- Location: 30.5012°N 117.0496°E; Anqing, Anhui, China
- Date: 5 June 2021; 16:26 – 16:35
- Target: Random pedestrians
- Attack type: Mass stabbing
- Weapon: Knife
- Deaths: 7
- Injuries: 13
- Perpetrator: Wu Liang

On 5 June 2021, a mass stabbing took place in Anqing, Anhui, China, killing seven people and wounding thirteen others.

== Incident ==
The attack occurred on Renmin Road, a popular shopping street in Anqing's eastern Yingjiang district. Within a timeframe of four minutes, the perpetrator indiscriminately stabbed twenty pedestrians. The perpetrator fled when police arrived at the scene, and was apprehended at a bus station at the adjoining Yicheng Road with the aid of bystanders after a five-minute search. The stabbings were recorded on surveillance footage.

By the end of the day, the Ministry of Public Security dispatched a team of investigators and medical specialists to Anqing to supervise the investigation and recovery of the injured victims. Provincial Party Secretary Li Jinbin, and Governor of Anhui Wang Qingxian ordered provincial services to provide direct aid to the city's hospitals.

== Victims ==
Six people died at the scene while a seventh died at a hospital four hours later. Of the deceased, five were male and two were female, aged 24 to 70, all of whom died of rupture wounds to vital organs. Five people were moderately wounded while another eight were treated for light injuries.

== Perpetrator ==
The perpetrator was identified as 25-year-old Wu Liang (Chinese: 吴亮), born 1 May 1996 in nearby Huaining County. He had primary school education, dropping out following the divorce of his parents. He remained unemployed his whole life and frequently ran away from home. In May 2013, Wu was committed to the 6th People's Hospital in Anqing for eight days. In later online posts, Wu claimed to have exercised with the goal of strangling someone more effectively, but found this too much effort and instead practised stabbing with a sharpened toothbrush. In July 2015, after again running away from home, police arrested Wu in Wuhan for intentional injury. Jianghan District People's Court sentenced him to fourteen months imprisonment at Qindankou prison, from which he was released on 4 September 2016.

Wu confessed to the crime, claiming to have been motivated by his family problems, describing himself as a pessimist. He apparently viewed his attack as a way to "vent" from his family issues. Wu had purchased the knife used in the attack online in spring of 2021 and lingered around Renmin Road several times in the preceding months. On social media posts on Baidu, Wu had previously expressed a desire to attain infamy and die young rather than of old age. Wu was sentenced to death on 15 November 2021 on counts of homicide and executed on 15 February 2022.
