= Gudian =

Gudian may refer to the following locations in China:

- Gudian, Hebei (固店镇), town in Wangdu County
- Gudian, Shanxi (古店镇), town in Nanjiao District, Datong
  - Gudian railway station (古店站), station on the Beijing–Baotou Railway in Datong
- Gudian Township, Anhui (古店乡), in Fengtai County
- Gudian Township, Sichuan (古店乡), in Zhongjiang County
