= Tongshan =

Tongshan may refer to the following locations in China:

- Tongshan County (通山县), Xianning, Hubei
- Tongshan District (铜山区, formerly Tongshan County), Xuzhou, Jiangsu

Township-level units

- Tongshan Subdistrict (铜山街道), Tongshan District, Xuzhou, Jiangsu
- Tongshan, Anhui (铜山镇), a town in Jiaoqu, Tongling
- Tongshan, Zhejiang (同山镇), a town in Zhuji
- Tongshan Township (铜山乡), Biyang County, Henan
- Tongshan, Dongkou (桐山乡), a township of Dongkou County, Hunan

== See also ==
- Dongshan County, formerly Tongshan
- Tangshan
