= Huihe =

Huihe may refer to:

- Uyghur Khaganate, or Huihe, a Turkic empire from the mid 8th century to the 9th century
- Huihe Township, in Tongling, Anhui, China
