= Zhaoji =

Zhaoji (赵集) may refer to the following locations in China:

- Zhaoji, Funan County, Anhui
- Zhaoji, Dengzhou, town in Henan
- Zhaoji, Huaibin County, town in Henan
- Zhaoji, Jiangsu, in Huaiyin District, Huai'an
- Zhaoji Township, Taihe County, Anhui
- Zhaoji, Wulipu in Wulipu, Shayang, Jingmen, Hubei
