= Kaicheng =

Kaicheng may refer to:

- Kaicheng (836–841), reign period of Emperor Wenzong of Tang
- Kaicheng, Anhui, in Sihou County, Anhui, China
- Kaicheng, Ningxia, in Yuanzhou District, Guyuan, Ningxia, China

== See also ==
- Kaesong, North Hwanghae, North Korea, whose Hanja name, when transliterated into Mandarin, is Kaicheng
