= Taomiao =

Táomiào (陶庙) may refer to the following locations in China:

- Taomiao, Anhui, town in Jieshou
- Taomiao, Shandong, town in Juye County
