= Huiguan Township =

- Subdistrict

Chinese transcription(s)
- Country: China
- Province: Anhui
- Prefecture: Anqing
- Time zone: UTC+8 (China Standard Time)

Huiguan Township (Chinese: 会馆乡) is a township-level division situated in Anqing, Anhui, China.

== See also ==
- List of township-level divisions of Anhui
