= Tianqiao =

Tianqiao may refer to the following places in China:

- Tianqiao District, a district of Jinan, Shandong

== Anhui ==
- Tianqiao Subdistrict, Bengbu, in Bengshan District, Bengbu
- Tianqiao Township, Anhui (田桥乡), in Linquan County

== Guizhou ==
- Tianqiao, Fenggang County (天桥), a town in Fenggang County
- Tianqiao Tujia and Miao Ethnic Township (天桥土家族苗族乡), in Sinan County, Guizhou

== Other provinces ==
- Tianqiao Subdistrict, Beijing (天桥街道), in Xicheng District, Beijing
- Tianqiao, Hebei (天桥), a town in Fengning Manchu Autonomous County, Hebei
- Tianqiao Subdistrict, Jinzhou (天桥街道), in Taihe District, Jinzhou, Liaoning
- Tianqiao, Juye County (田桥), a town in Juye County, Shandong
