= Jieshou =

Jieshou 界首市 Kieshu
- County-level city
- Interactive map of Jieshou
- Coordinates: 33°15′25″N 115°22′29″E
- Country: People's Republic of China
- Province: Anhui
- Prefecture-level city: Fuyang

Area
  - Total: 667.3 km^{2} (257.6 sq mi)
- Elevation: 39 m (128 ft)

Population (2019)
  - Total: 834,000
  - Density: 1,250/km^{2} (3,240/sq mi)
- Time zone: UTC+8 (CST)
- Postal Code: 236500

Jieshou (Chinese: 界首; pinyin: Jièshǒu) is a county-level city under the administration of Fuyang City, located on the Huang-Huai Plain in northwestern Anhui province, People's Republic of China. Jieshou, an important commercial port and gateway, borders Henan Province on the west and the Ying River, a major tributary of the Huai River flows in a southeasterly direction across the county to Fuyang. According to the "China Statistical Yearbook" the population of Jieshou city stood at 109,103 in 2010, while GeoNames, puts the population at over 140,000 inhabitants. Covering a total area of 667 square kilometers, the county-level city comprises three urban sub-districts of Jieshou, and in the surrounding rural area a further 15 towns and townships make up the total population of 740,000.

== History ==
During the Qing dynasty Jieshou was part of Yingzhou Prefecture.

== Administrative divisions ==
In the present, Jieshou City has 3 sub-districts, 12 towns, and 3 townships.

Sub-District

- Dongcheng (东城街道 : Dōngchéng jiēdào)
- Xicheng (西城街道 : Xīchéng jiēdào)
- Yingnan (颍南街道 : Yǐng nán jiēdào)

Town

- Guangwu (光武镇 : Guāngwǔ)
- Lucun (芦村镇 : Lúcūn)
- Xinmaji (新马集镇 : Xīnmǎjí)
- Dahuang (大黄镇 : Dàhuáng)
- Tianying (田营镇 : Tiányíng)
- Taomiao (陶庙镇 : Táomiào)
- Quanyang (泉阳镇 : Quányáng) - it was renamed from Yangquan (阳泉镇).
- Wangji (王集镇 : Wángjí)
- Zhuanji (砖集镇 : Zhuānjí)
- Guji (顾集镇 : Gùjí)
- Daiqiao (代桥镇 : Dàiqiáo)
- Shuzhuang (舒庄镇 : Shūzhuāng)

Township

- Bingji (邴集乡 : Bǐngjíxiāng)
- Jinzhai (靳寨乡 : Jìnzhàixiāng)
- Renzhai (任寨乡 : Rènzhàixiāng)

== Climate ==
Climate data for Jieshou, elevation 38 m (125 ft), (1991–2020 normals, extremes 1981–present)
Month	Jan	Feb	Mar	Apr	May	Jun	Jul	Aug	Sep	Oct	Nov	Dec	Year
Record high °C (°F)	19.4 (66.9)	26.4 (79.5)	32.0 (89.6)	33.7 (92.7)	37.8 (100.0)	39.4 (102.9)	40.7 (105.3)	39.1 (102.4)	38.8 (101.8)	35.2 (95.4)	28.1 (82.6)	21.4 (70.5)	40.7 (105.3)
Mean daily maximum °C (°F)	6.3 (43.3)	9.5 (49.1)	15.9 (60.6)	21.6 (70.9)	27.0 (80.6)	31.4 (88.5)	32.2 (90.0)	31.3 (88.3)	27.3 (81.1)	22.6 (72.7)	14.8 (58.6)	8.9 (48.0)	20.7 (69.3)
Daily mean °C (°F)	1.3 (34.3)	4.2 (39.6)	10.1 (50.2)	15.6 (60.1)	21.2 (70.2)	25.7 (78.3)	27.6 (81.7)	26.6 (79.9)	21.9 (71.4)	16.7 (62.1)	9.6 (49.3)	3.4 (38.1)	15.3 (59.6)
Mean daily minimum °C (°F)	−2.5 (27.5)	0.3 (32.5)	5.3 (41.5)	10.2 (50.4)	16.0 (60.8)	20.7 (69.3)	23.9 (75.0)	23.1 (73.6)	18.0 (64.4)	12.3 (54.1)	5.5 (41.9)	−0.6 (30.9)	11.0 (51.8)
Record low °C (°F)	−12.4 (9.7)	−11.4 (11.5)	−5.0 (23.0)	−1.2 (29.8)	4.4 (39.9)	11.3 (52.3)	17.3 (63.1)	14.0 (57.2)	8.1 (46.6)	0.8 (33.4)	−8.4 (16.9)	−14.7 (5.5)	−14.7 (5.5)
Average precipitation mm (inches)	21.7 (0.85)	24.4 (0.96)	40.2 (1.58)	53.3 (2.10)	80.5 (3.17)	132.5 (5.22)	196.6 (7.74)	143.0 (5.63)	77.2 (3.04)	55.9 (2.20)	39.5 (1.56)	19.3 (0.76)	884.1 (34.81)
Average precipitation days (≥ 0.1 mm)	5.4	6.1	7.1	7.2	8.9	7.7	11.6	10.9	8.6	7.1	6.5	5.0	92.1
Average snowy days	4.2	2.8	0.9	0	0	0	0	0	0	0	0.7	1.6	10.2
Average relative humidity (%)	71	69	68	71	72	71	81	84	79	73	72	71	74
Mean monthly sunshine hours	124.9	130.7	167.5	199.9	207.9	196.7	205.9	190.6	165.7	161.3	148.5	134.0	2,033.6
Percentage possible sunshine	39	42	45	51	48	46	47	47	45	46	48	43	46
Source: China Meteorological Administration
