= Qingnian Subdistrict, Bengbu =

Coordinates: 32.945°N 117.369°E

Qingnian Subdistrict, Bengbu 青年街道
- Subdistrict

Chinese transcription(s)
  - Chinese: 青年街道
  - Pinyin: Qīngnián jiēdào
- Interactive map of Qingnian Subdistrict, Bengbu
- Country: China
- Province: Anhui
- Prefecture: Bengbu
- Time zone: UTC+8 (China Standard Time)

Qingnian Subdistrict, Bengbu is a township-level division situated in Bengbu, Anhui, China. In 2026, it was renamed Xingye Subdistrict.

== See also ==
- List of township-level divisions of Anhui
