= Xieji Township =

Xieji Township 谢集乡
- Township
- Interactive map of Xieji Township
- Coordinates: 32°43′28″N 115°19′43″E
- Country: People's Republic of China
- Province: Anhui
- Prefecture-level city: Fuyang
- County: Linquan
- Village-level divisions: 10 villages
- Elevation: 38 m (125 ft)
- Time zone: UTC+8 (China Standard)
- Area code: 0558

Xieji Township (simplified Chinese: 谢集乡; traditional Chinese: 謝集鄉; pinyin: Xièjí Xiāng) is a township of Linquan County in northwestern Anhui province, China, located about 13 kilometres (8.1 mi) from the border with Henan and 36 km (22 mi) south-southeast of the county seat. As of 2011, it has 10 villages under its administration.

== See also ==
- List of township-level divisions of Anhui
