= Guandou Subdistrict =

Coordinates: 31.3682°N 118.3945°E

Guandou Subdistrict 官陡街道
- Subdistrict

Chinese transcription(s)
  - Chinese: 官陡街道
  - Pinyin: Guāndǒu jiēdào
- Interactive map of Guandou Subdistrict
- Country: China
- Province: Anhui
- Prefecture: Wuhu
- District: Jiujiang
- Time zone: UTC+8 (China Standard Time)

Guandou Subdistrict is a township-level division situated in the Jiujiang District, Wuhu, Anhui, China.

== See also ==
- List of township-level divisions of Anhui
