= Daqiao, Dingyuan County =

Daqiao 大桥镇
- Town
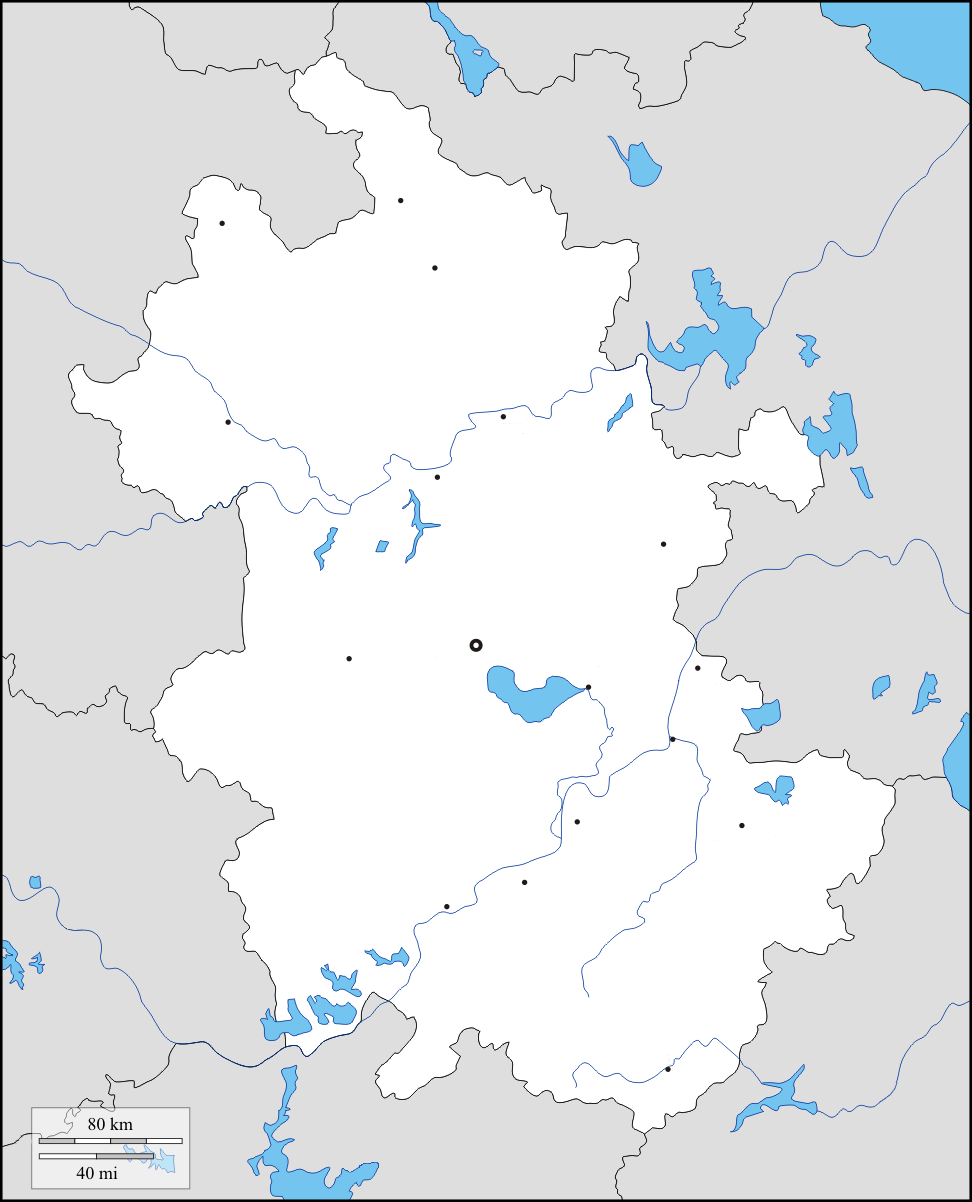
- Location in Anhui Daqiao (China)
- Coordinates: 32°18′8″N 117°45′54″E
- Country: People's Republic of China
- Province: Anhui
- Prefecture-level city: Chuzhou
- County: Dingyuan County
- Time zone: UTC+8 (China Standard)

Daqiao (simplified Chinese: 大桥; traditional Chinese: 大橋; pinyin: Dàqiáo) is a town in Dingyuan County, Chuzhou, Anhui province, China. As of 2018, it has 1 residential community and 6 villages under its administration.

== See also ==
- List of township-level divisions of Anhui
