= Niqiu =

Niqiu 倪邱镇
- Town
- Interactive map of Niqiu
- Coordinates: 33°24′36″N 115°37′23″E
- Country: People's Republic of China
- Province: Anhui
- Prefecture-level city: Fuyang
- County: Taihe
- Village-level divisions: 3 residential communities 10 villages
- Elevation: 35 m (115 ft)
- Time zone: UTC+8 (China Standard)
- Area code: 0558

Niqiu (Chinese: 倪邱; pinyin: Níqiū) is a town of Taihe County in northwestern Anhui province, China, located 26 kilometres (16 mi) north of the county seat along China National Highway 105. As of 2011, it has three residential communities (居委会) and 10 villages under its administration.

== See also ==
- List of township-level divisions of Anhui
