= Shitai County =

Shitai 石台县 Shihtai
- County
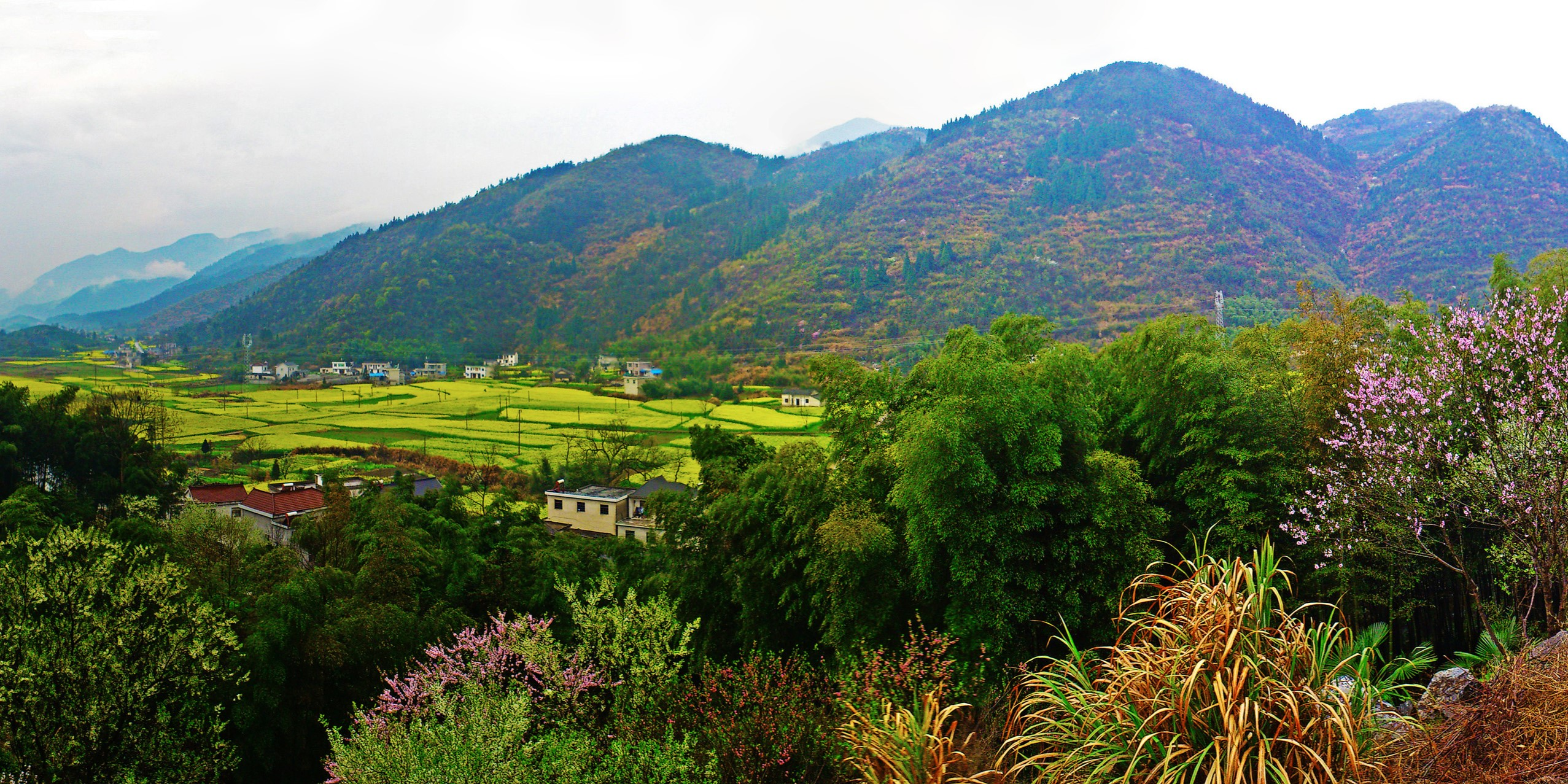
- Interactive map of Shitai
- Coordinates: 30°12′37″N 117°29′11″E
- Country: People's Republic of China
- Province: Anhui
- Prefecture-level city: Chizhou

Area
  - Total: 1,403 km^{2} (542 sq mi)

Population (2019)
  - Total: 107,553
  - Density: 76.66/km^{2} (198.5/sq mi)
- Time zone: UTC+8 (China Standard)
- Postal code: 245100

Shitai County (simplified Chinese: 石台县; traditional Chinese: 石台縣; pinyin: Shítái Xiàn) is a county in the south of Anhui Province, People's Republic of China, under the jurisdiction of the prefecture-level city of Chizhou. It has population of 110,000 and an area of 1,403 km^{2} (542 sq mi). The government of Shitai County is located in Qili Town. Shitai County is a producer of silk and tea leaves.

The well-known "Guniujiang" National Nature Reserve is located on the border between Shitai County and Qimen County. It is said that the "Guniujiang" has the last piece of original forest in East China.

== Administrative divisions ==
Shitai County has jurisdiction over six towns and two townships.

Towns:

- Renli (仁里镇), Hengdu (横渡镇), Xianyu (仙寓镇), Qidu (七都镇), Xiaohe (小河镇), Dingxiang (丁香镇)

Townships:

- Dayan Township (大演乡), Jitan Township (矶滩乡)

== Climate ==
Climate data for Shitai, elevation 119 m (390 ft), (1991–2020 normals, extremes 1991–present)
Month	Jan	Feb	Mar	Apr	May	Jun	Jul	Aug	Sep	Oct	Nov	Dec	Year
Record high °C (°F)	26.6 (79.9)	28.8 (83.8)	35.6 (96.1)	35.0 (95.0)	37.4 (99.3)	37.7 (99.9)	41.6 (106.9)	42.4 (108.3)	39.2 (102.6)	38.9 (102.0)	32.2 (90.0)	25.2 (77.4)	42.4 (108.3)
Mean daily maximum °C (°F)	9.8 (49.6)	12.8 (55.0)	17.5 (63.5)	23.6 (74.5)	28.0 (82.4)	30.4 (86.7)	33.9 (93.0)	33.5 (92.3)	29.9 (85.8)	24.8 (76.6)	18.8 (65.8)	12.6 (54.7)	23.0 (73.3)
Daily mean °C (°F)	4.3 (39.7)	6.9 (44.4)	11.1 (52.0)	16.9 (62.4)	21.5 (70.7)	24.9 (76.8)	28.1 (82.6)	27.4 (81.3)	23.6 (74.5)	17.9 (64.2)	11.8 (53.2)	6.1 (43.0)	16.7 (62.1)
Mean daily minimum °C (°F)	0.8 (33.4)	3.0 (37.4)	6.7 (44.1)	12.1 (53.8)	17.0 (62.6)	21.2 (70.2)	24.2 (75.6)	23.8 (74.8)	19.8 (67.6)	13.7 (56.7)	7.5 (45.5)	2.0 (35.6)	12.6 (54.8)
Record low °C (°F)	−11.3 (11.7)	−7.2 (19.0)	−5.6 (21.9)	0.0 (32.0)	7.8 (46.0)	13.3 (55.9)	17.7 (63.9)	15.4 (59.7)	9.1 (48.4)	1.6 (34.9)	−4.2 (24.4)	−12.4 (9.7)	−12.4 (9.7)
Average precipitation mm (inches)	80.9 (3.19)	90.4 (3.56)	140.2 (5.52)	164.8 (6.49)	191.0 (7.52)	295.2 (11.62)	259.3 (10.21)	176.2 (6.94)	76.7 (3.02)	61.8 (2.43)	64.7 (2.55)	50.2 (1.98)	1,651.4 (65.03)
Average precipitation days (≥ 0.1 mm)	12.5	12.8	15.2	14.5	14.3	15.9	14.3	15.3	9.5	8.6	10.2	10.0	153.1
Average snowy days	4.1	2.5	0.6	0	0	0	0	0	0	0	0.3	1.4	8.9
Average relative humidity (%)	78	77	76	76	78	82	80	81	80	78	79	77	79
Mean monthly sunshine hours	94.2	94.9	114.1	137.7	155.4	129.4	189.2	177.6	151.1	147.9	123.3	117.9	1,632.7
Percentage possible sunshine	29	30	31	36	37	31	44	44	41	42	39	37	37
Source: China Meteorological Administration
