= Jiujiang, Wuhu =

Jiujiang 鸠江区
- District
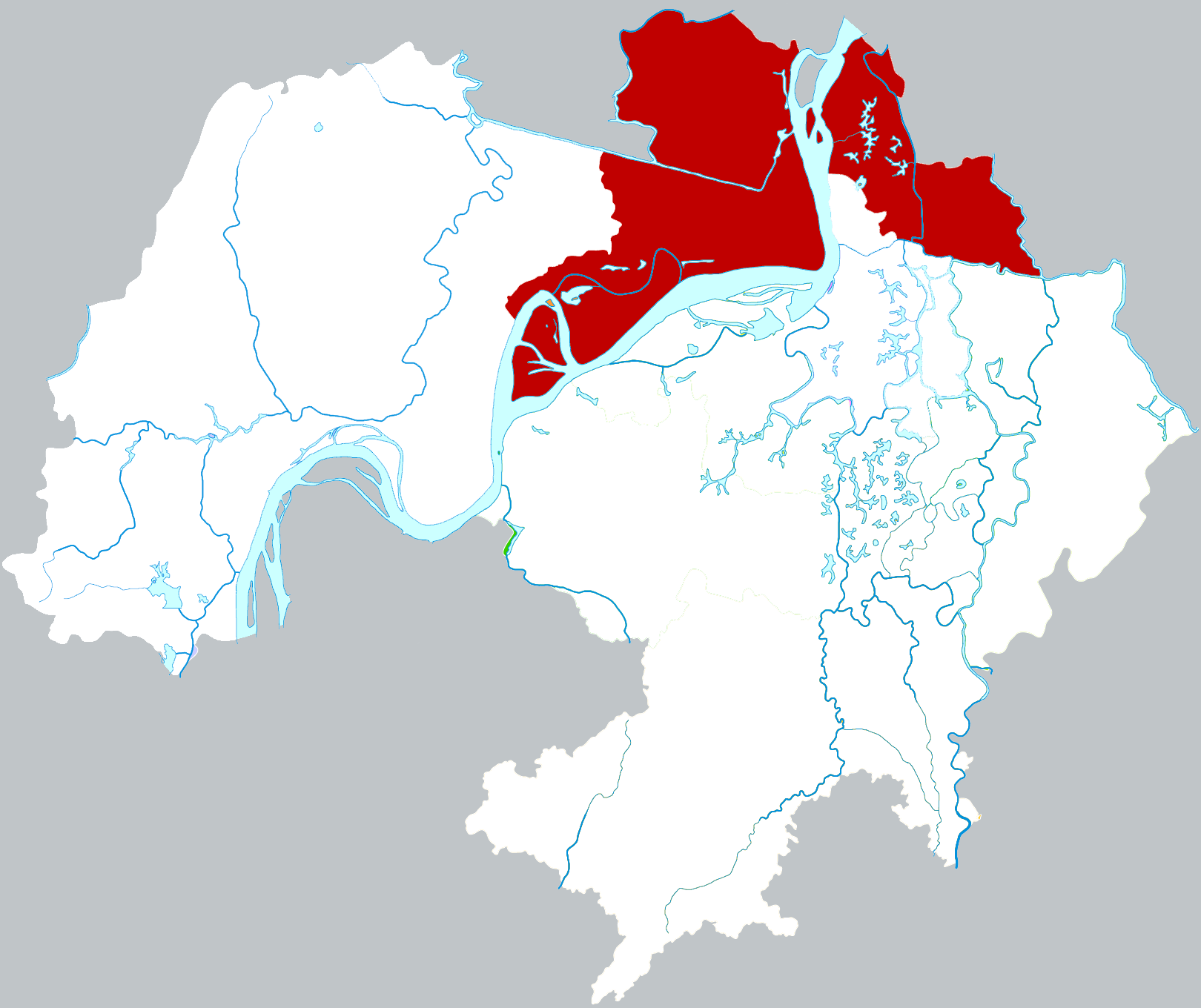
- Jiujiang in Wuhu
- Coordinates: 31°22′20″N 118°22′37″E
- Country: China
- Province: Anhui
- Prefecture-level city: Wuhu
- District seat: Erba

Area
  - Total: 820 km^{2} (320 sq mi)

Population (2020)
  - Total: 540,487
  - Density: 660/km^{2} (1,700/sq mi)
- Time zone: UTC+8 (China Standard)
- Postal code: 241000

Jiujiang District (simplified Chinese: 鸠江区; traditional Chinese: 鳩江區; pinyin: Jiūjiāng Qū; lit. 'turtledove river') is a district and the seat of the city of Wuhu, Anhui Province, China.

== Administrative divisions ==
Jiujiang District is divided to 5 subdistricts, 4 towns and 3 others.

5 Subdistricts

- Siheshan Subdistrict (四褐山街道)
- Yuxikou Subdistrict (裕溪口街道)
- Guandou Subdistrict (官陡街道)
- Wanli Subdistrict (湾里街道)
- Qingshui Subdistrict (清水街道)

4 Towns

- Shenxiang (沈巷镇)
- Erba (二坝镇)
- Tanggou (汤沟镇)
- Baimao (白茆镇)

3 Others

- Jiangbei Industrial Concentration Zone (江北产业集中区)
- Jiujiang Economic and Technological Development Zone (鸠江经济技术开发区)
- Zone Erba Park, Jiujiang Economic and Technological Development Zone (鸠江经济开发区二坝园区)

== Transportation ==
The district is served by Wuhu North railway station.
