= Wafang Town =

Coordinates: 33°39′45″N 117°57′22″E

Wafang Township 瓦坊镇
- Subdistrict

Chinese transcription(s)
- Interactive map of Wafang Township
- Country: China
- Province: Anhui
- Prefecture: Suzhou
- County: Sixian
- Time zone: UTC+8 (China Standard Time)

Wafang Township (Chinese: 瓦坊镇) is a town situated in Suzhou, Anhui, China. It was a township until March 2021.

== See also ==
- List of township-level divisions of Anhui
