= Xiaohe, Anhui =

Xiaohe 小河镇
- Town

Chinese transcription(s)
- Interactive map of Xiaohe
- Coordinates: 30.25744°N 117.30263°E
- Country: China
- Province: Anhui
- Prefecture: Chizhou
- County: Shitai County
- Time zone: UTC+8 (China Standard Time)

Xiaohe (Chinese: 小河; pinyin: Xiǎohé) is a township-level division situated in Shitai County, Chizhou, Anhui, China.

== See also ==
- List of township-level divisions of Anhui
