= Xiangyang Subdistrict, Fuyang =

Xiangyang Subdistrict 向阳街道
- Subdistrict
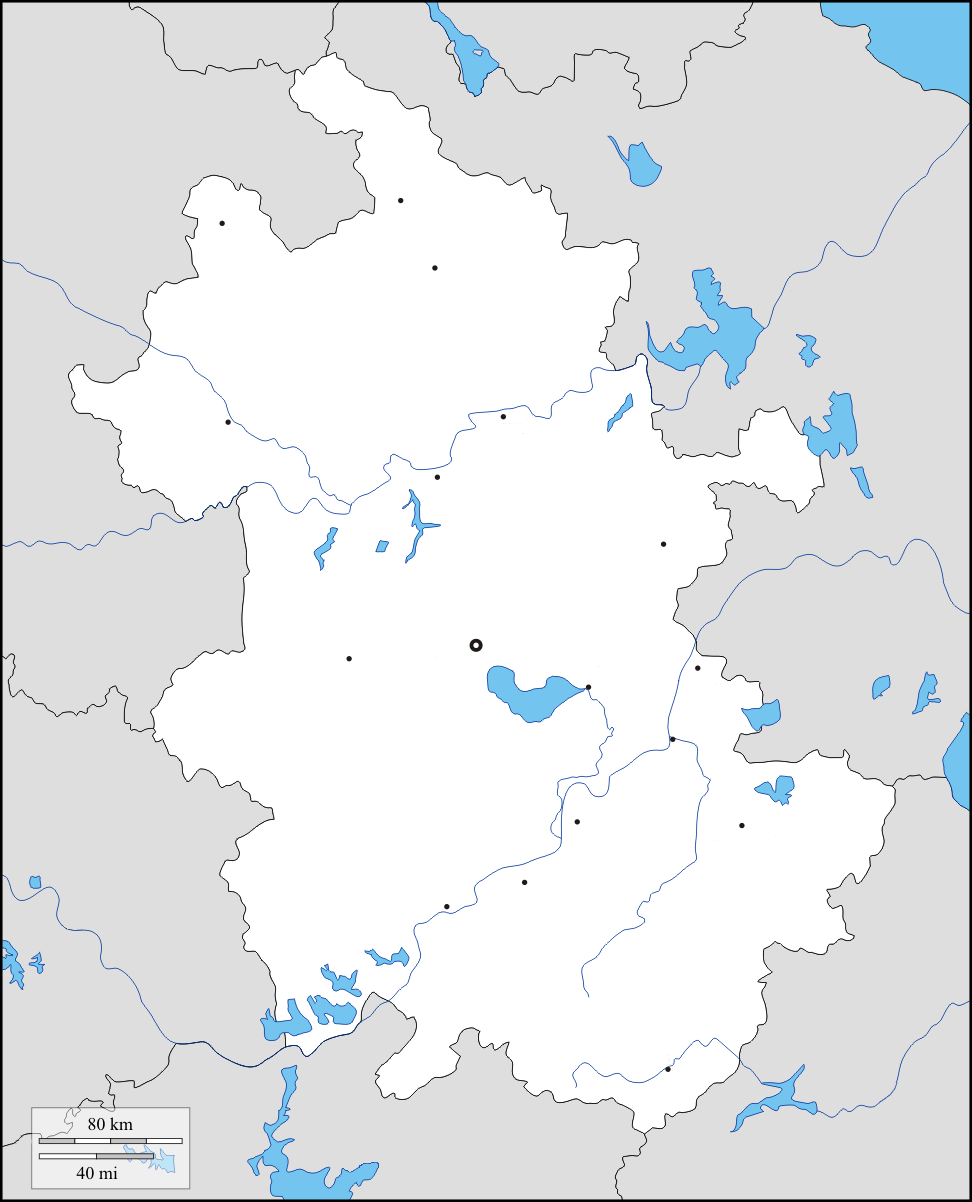
- Location in Anhui Xiangyang Subdistrict (China)
- Coordinates: 32°54′20″N 115°51′26″E
- Country: People's Republic of China
- Province: Anhui
- Prefecture-level city: Fuyang
- District: Yingdong District
- Time zone: UTC+8 (China Standard)

Xiangyang Subdistrict (Chinese: 向阳街道; pinyin: Xiàngyáng Jiēdào) is a subdistrict in Yingdong District, Fuyang, Anhui, China. As of 2018, it has 7 residential communities under its administration.

== See also ==
- List of township-level divisions of Anhui
