= Hudong Road Subdistrict =

Coordinates: 31.68686°N 118.50627°E

Hudong Road Subdistrict 湖东路街道
- Subdistrict

Chinese transcription(s)
- Interactive map of Hudong Road Subdistrict
- Country: China
- Province: Anhui
- Prefecture: Ma'anshan
- District: Huashan
- Time zone: UTC+8 (China Standard Time)

Hudong Road Subdistrict (Chinese: 湖东路街道; pinyin: Húdōng Lù Jiēdào) is a township-level division situated in Huashan District, Ma'anshan, Anhui, China.

== See also ==
- List of township-level divisions of Anhui
