= Zhaoji, Funan County =

Coordinates: 32.919°N 115.83°E

Zhaoji
- Subdistrict

Chinese transcription(s)
  - Chinese: 赵集镇
  - Pinyin: Zhàojí Zhèn
- Interactive map of Zhaoji
- Country: China
- Province: Anhui
- Prefecture: Fuyang
- County: Funan
- Time zone: UTC+8 (China Standard Time)

Zhaoji is a township-level division situated in Funan County, Fuyang, Anhui, China.

== See also ==
- List of township-level divisions of Anhui
