= Jiaoqu, Tongling =

Jiaoqu 郊区
- District
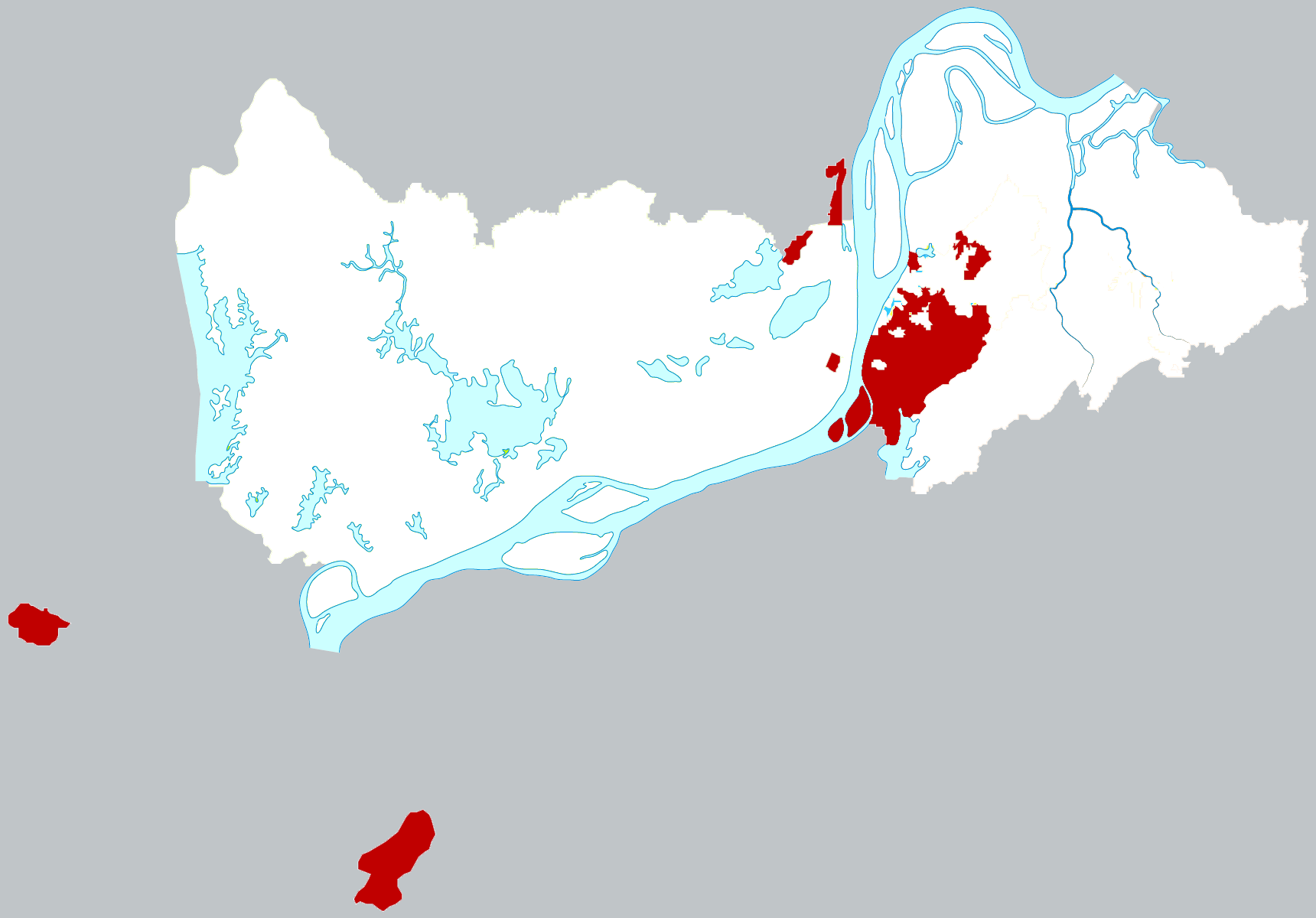
- Jiaoqu in Tongling
- Coordinates: 30°53′55″N 117°47′07″E
- Country: China
- Province: Anhui
- Prefecture-level city: Tongling
- District seat: Datong

Area
  - Total: 650 km^{2} (250 sq mi)

Population (2020)
  - Total: 164,233
  - Density: 250/km^{2} (650/sq mi)
- Time zone: UTC+8 (China Standard)
- Postal code: 244000

Jiao District or Jiaoqu (simplified Chinese: 郊区; traditional Chinese: 郊區; pinyin: Jiāoqū; lit. 'suburban district') is a district of Tongling, Anhui province, China. As of 2012, it has a population of 50,000 residing in an area of 154 km^{2} (59 sq mi).

In October 2018, Tongling City implemented zoning adjustment, Zongyang County Laozhou Town, Chenyaohu Town, and Zhoutan Town were placed under the jurisdiction of Jiaoqu District.

== Administrative divisions ==
Jiaoqu is divided to 2 subdistrict, 5 towns, and 1 township.

- Qiaonan Subdistrict (桥南街道)
- Anqingkuangqu Subdistrict (安庆矿区街道)

2 Towns

- Datong (大通镇)
- Tongshan (铜山镇)
- Laozhou (老洲镇)
- Chenyaohu (陈瑶湖镇)
- Zhoutan (周潭镇)

1 Township

- Huihe Township (灰河乡)
