= Gudian Township, Anhui =

Coordinates: 32.88848°N 116.53032°E

Gudian Township
- Subdistrict

Chinese transcription(s)
- Interactive map of Gudian Township
- Country: China
- Province: Anhui
- Prefecture: Huainan
- Time zone: UTC+8 (China Standard Time)

Gudian Township (Chinese: 古店乡) is a township-level division situated in Huainan, Anhui, China.

== See also ==
- List of township-level divisions of Anhui
