= Yingjiang District =

Yingjiang 迎江区
- District
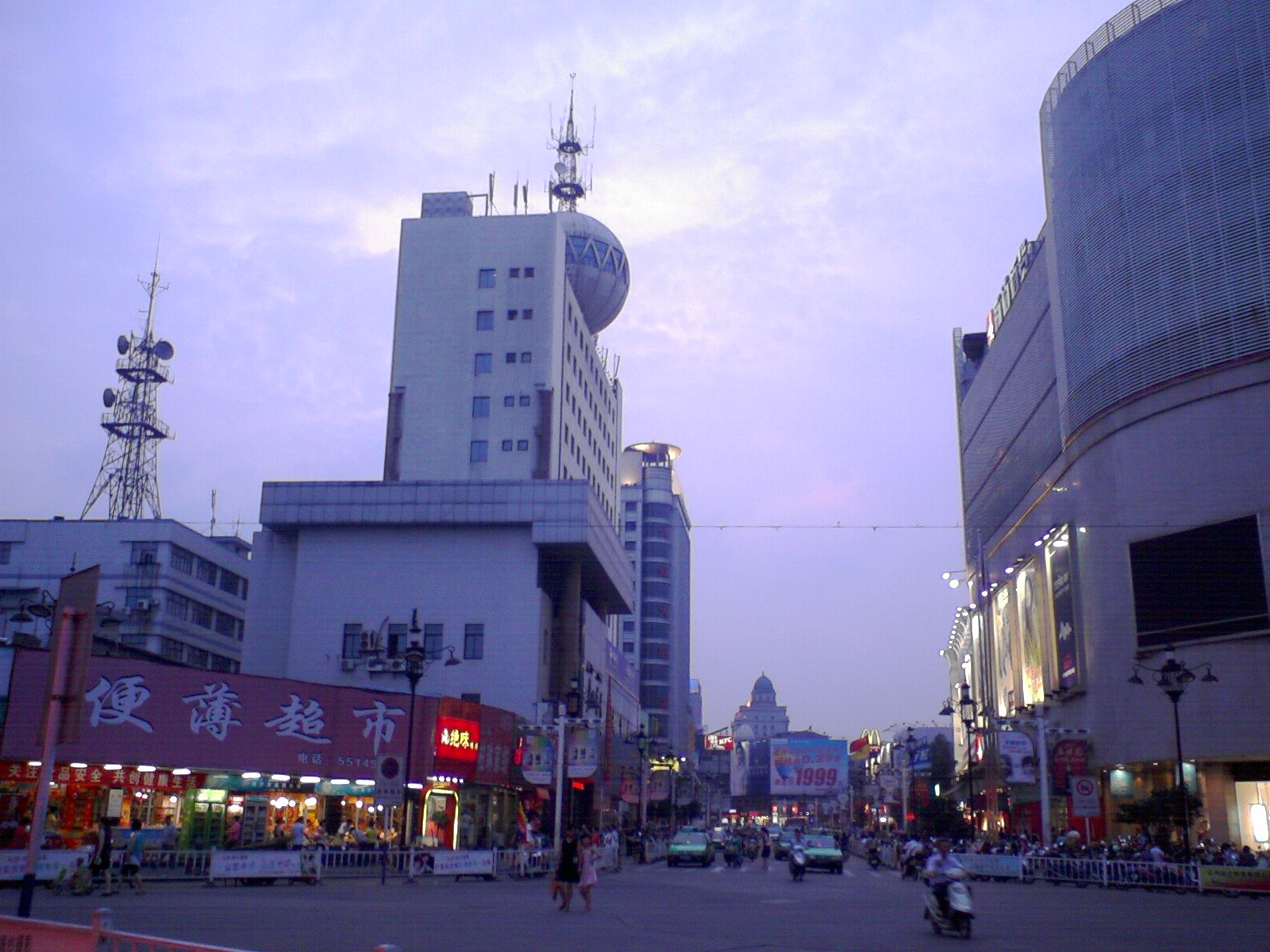

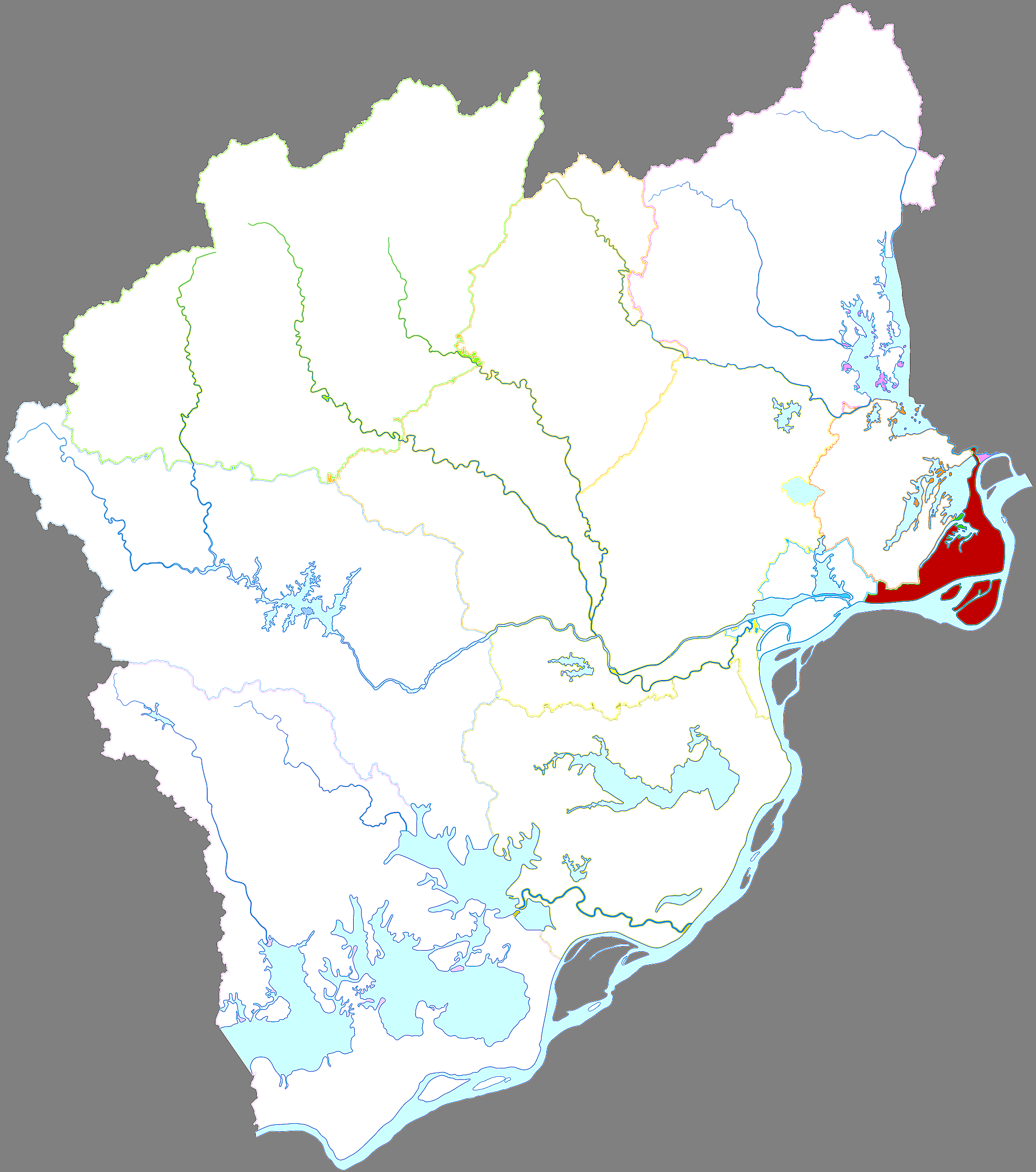
- Yingjiang in Anqing

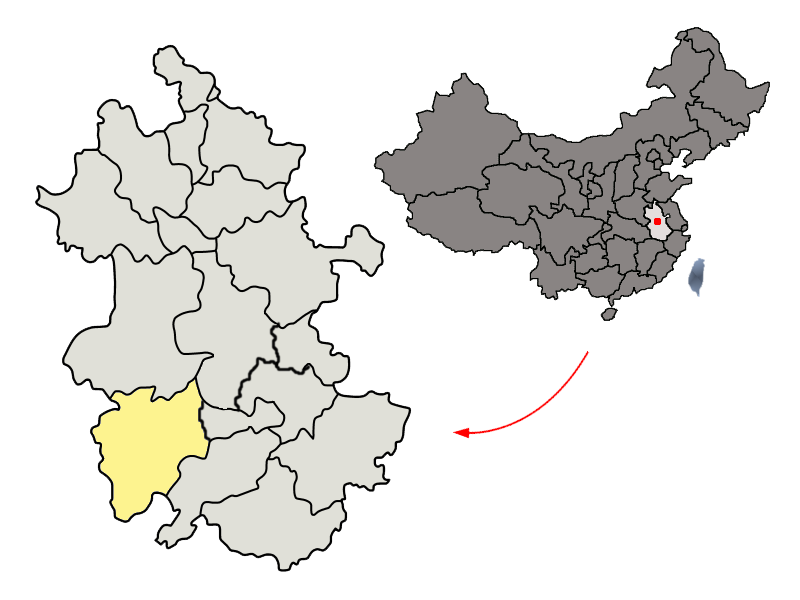
- Anqing in Anhui
- Coordinates: 30°30′41″N 117°05′28″E
- Country: China
- Province: Anhui
- Prefecture-level division: Anqing
- District seat: Yichenglu

Area
  - Total: 207 km^{2} (80 sq mi)

Population (2020)
  - Total: 278,700
  - Density: 1,350/km^{2} (3,490/sq mi)
- Time zone: UTC+8 (China Standard)
- Postal Code: 246001

Yingjiang District (simplified Chinese: 迎江区; traditional Chinese: 迎江區; pinyin: Yíngjiāng Qū) is an urban district of and the easternmost county-level division of the city of Anqing, Anhui Province, China. It has a population of 278,700 (2020) and an area of 207 square kilometres (80 sq mi).

== Administrative divisions ==
Yingjiang District has jurisdiction over six administrative subdistricts and four towns.

- Renmin Road Subdistrict (人民路街道), Huazhong Road Subdistrict (华中路街道), Xiaosu Road Subdistrict (孝肃路街道), Yicheng Road Subdistrict (宜城路街道), Xinhe Road Subdistrict (新河路街道), Jianshe Road Subdistrict (建设路街道)

Towns

- Changfeng (长风镇), Xinzhou (新洲镇), Longshiqiao (龙狮桥镇), Laofeng (老峰镇)
