= Xiangyang Town, Anhui =

Xiangyang Town 向阳镇
- Township
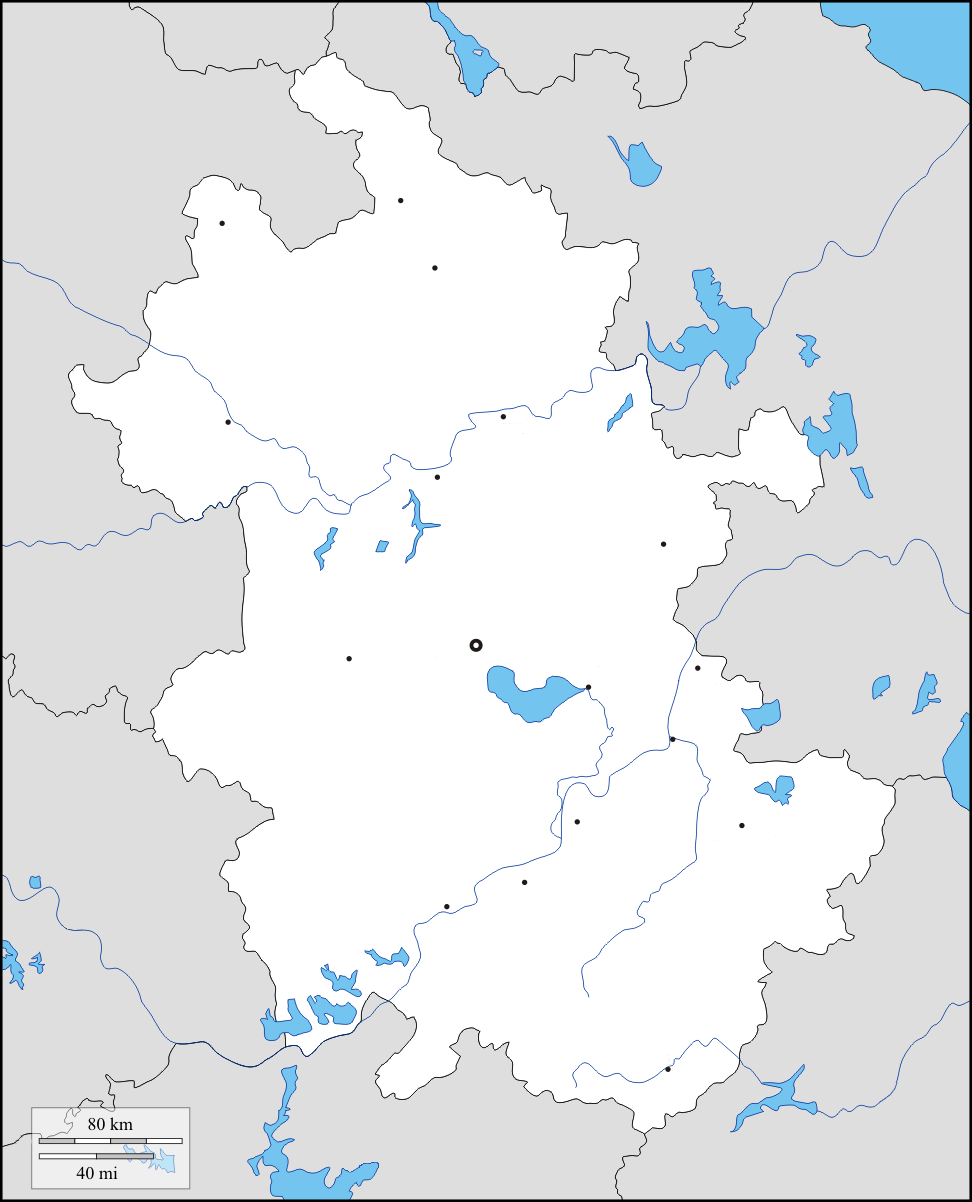
- Location in Anhui Xiangyang Town (China)
- Coordinates: 33°27′51″N 117°34′38″E
- Country: People's Republic of China
- Province: Anhui
- Prefecture-level city: Suzhou
- County: Lingbi County
- Time zone: UTC+8 (China Standard)

Xiangyang Town (simplified Chinese: 向阳镇; traditional Chinese: 向陽鎮; pinyin: Xiàngyáng Zhèn) is a town under the administration of Lingbi County, Anhui, China. As of 2018, it has 12 villages under its administration. It was a township until March 2021.
