= Renmin Road Subdistrict, Anqing =

Renmin Road Subdistrict 人民路街道
- Subdistrict
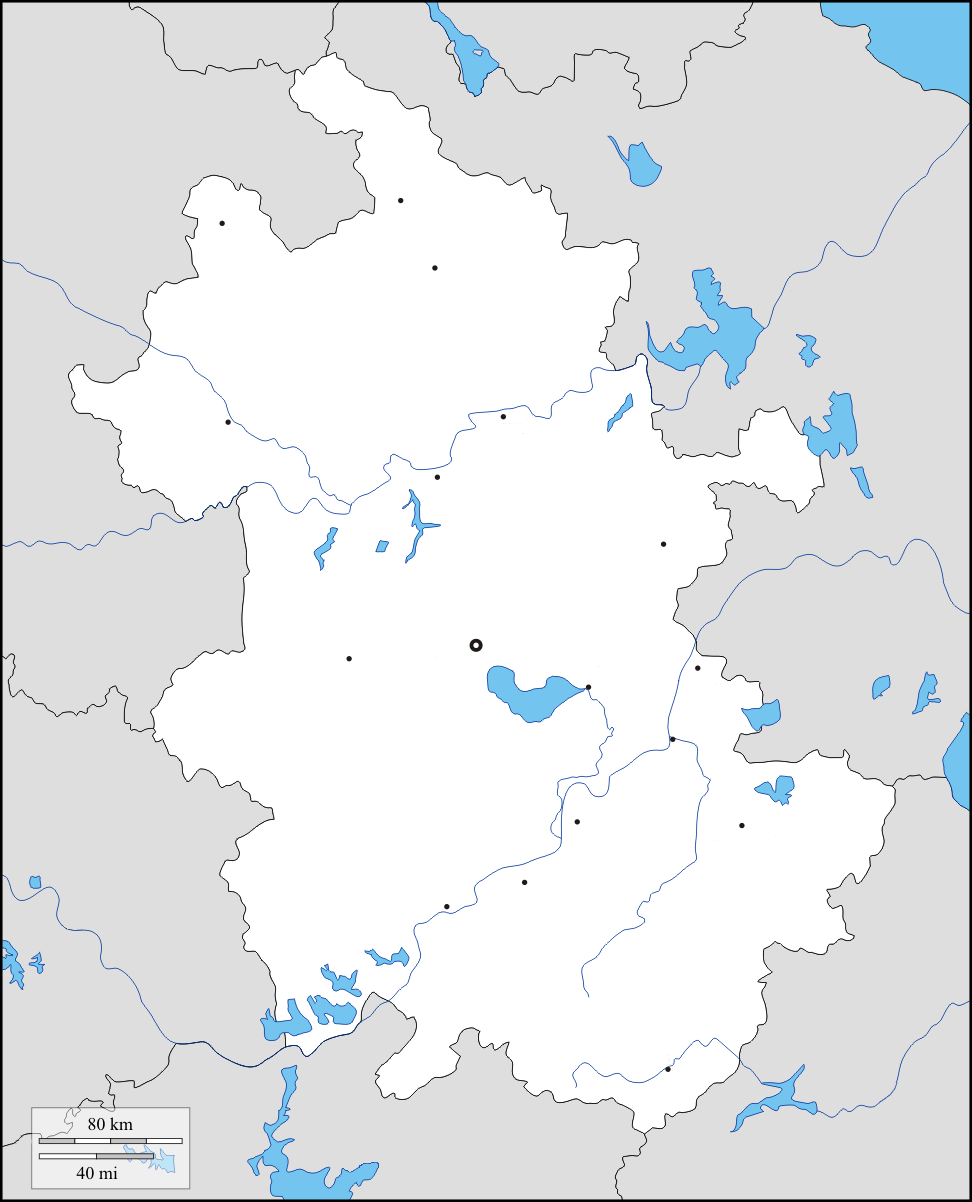
- Location in Anhui Renmin Road Subdistrict (China)
- Coordinates: 30.50701°N 117.06615°E
- Country: China
- Province: Anhui
- Prefecture: Anqing
- District: Yingjiang District
- Time zone: UTC+8 (China Standard Time)

Renmin Road Subdistrict (Chinese: 人民路街道; pinyin: Rénmínlù Jiēdào) is a subdistrict situated in Yingjiang District, Anqing, Anhui, China. As of 2020, it administers the following four residential neighborhoods:

- Paoyingshan (炮营山)
- Xianfeng (先锋)
- Kangxihe (康熙河)
- Dongzheng (东正)

== See also ==
- List of township-level divisions of Anhui
