= Taomiao, Anhui =

Taomiao 陶庙镇
- Town
- Interactive map of Taomiao
- Coordinates: 33°11′21″N 115°22′25″E
- Country: People's Republic of China
- Province: Anhui
- Prefecture-level city: Fuyang
- County-level city: Jieshou
- Elevation: 38 m (125 ft)
- Time zone: UTC+8 (China Standard)

Taomiao (simplified Chinese: 陶庙; traditional Chinese: 陶廟; pinyin: Táomiào) is a town of Jieshou City in northwestern Anhui province, China, located 5 kilometres (3.1 mi) from the border with Henan and 8 km (5.0 mi) south of downtown Jieshou. As of 2011, it has 14 villages under its administration.

== See also ==
- List of township-level divisions of Anhui
