= Tianqiao Subdistrict, Bengbu =

Coordinates: 32.9450°N 117.3688°E

Tianqiao Subdistrict, Bengbu 天桥街道
- Subdistrict

Chinese transcription(s)
  - Traditional: 天橋街道
  - Simplified: 天桥街道
  - Pinyin: Tiānqiáo Jiēdào
- Interactive map of Tianqiao Subdistrict, Bengbu
- Country: China
- Province: Anhui
- Prefecture: Bengbu
- Time zone: UTC+8 (China Standard Time)

Tianqiao Subdistrict, Bengbu is a township-level division situated in Bengbu, Anhui, China.

== See also ==
- List of township-level divisions of Anhui
