= Huihe Township =

Coordinates: 30.97936°N 117.68395°E

Huihe Township 灰河乡
- Township

Chinese transcription(s)
- Interactive map of Huihe Township
- Country: China
- Province: Anhui
- Prefecture: Tongling
- District: Jiaoqu
- Time zone: UTC+8 (China Standard Time)

Huihe Township (Chinese: 灰河乡; pinyin: Huīhé Xiāng) is a township in Jiaoqu, Tongling, Anhui, China.

== See also ==
- List of township-level divisions of Anhui
