= Tianying =

Coordinates: 29°55′N 119°25′E

Tianying 田营镇
- Town
- Interactive map of Tianying
- Country: China
- Province: Anhui
- Prefecture-level city: Fuyang
- County: Jieshou

Population
  - Total: 26,095

Tianying (Chinese: 田营; pinyin: Tiányíng) is a town under the administration of Jieshou, which is in turn administered by the prefecture-level city of Fuyang, in northwestern Anhui Province, China. The town has 26,095 inhabitants according to the 2001 census.

== Pollution ==
Nearly half of China's lead production is located in Tianying and the surrounding area. The use of antiquated technology and lack of proper disposal has led to high levels of lead pollution in the area. While the government closed some of the lead factories in 2003, the Blacksmith Institute still rated the place as one of the world's most polluted in 2007. Tianying, along with the Chinese city of Linfen, are two of the world's most polluted cities according to Time.

Battery smelting - the cause of most of the city's pollution, is the process of rendering down old batteries to retrieve the lead within it to use in other technologies. This process accounts for much of Tianying's economy, making it difficult for the Government of China to regulate it. The largest foundry in Tianying is the Government-owned Jiaxin Group which employs much of the population. This foundry is also located in the middle of the city which has had significant consequences for those individuals living in close proximity.

== Health Impacts ==
Studies have shown that air and soil samples in Tianying have exceed national health standards by 8.5 to 10 times the acceptable limits. Local wheat contains 24% more lead than the permissible limit and accepted standards for suspended lead particles are exceeded 85% of the time. Over 140,000 people have been affected by heavy metal pollution and other toxic substances in Tianying due to smelting; with dangerous adverse health impacts such as kidney damage, anemia, miscarriages, congenital disabilities, and brain damage observed. Due to the fact children are the most susceptible to lead poisoning, an epidemiological study looked at the impacts of Tianying's lead smelting on children by selecting 959 children between the ages of 5 - 12 in the villages where lead smelters were located in residential areas. This group was then compared to a control group of 207 children selected from villages without lead exposure.

These results, which were recorded at 496 microgram/L (compared to the norm in China of 100 microgram/L), demonstrate that the mean blood lead levels of the children living in polluted areas were substantially higher than those living in non-polluted areas. Side effects in the children affected by lead exposure and poisoning in Tianying included lower IQs, developmental disabilities, attention deficit disorder, hearing and vision disabilities, stomach and colon irritation, kidney damage, and brain damage.

== Government action ==
In 2003, China’s Xinhua News Agency reported that the local environmental protection administration had ordered a halt to all lead production in Jieshou City and Taihe County. In 2007, the Tianying Recycling Economic Park was constructed with more than 40 companies operating within it. The Government spent upwards of USD $163 million to complete this transition and make the city healthier for its inhabitants through its construction. As a result of this new industrial complex, the nearest village is now located 1 km away, which is an improvement from the last factories which operated within residential neighbourhoods.
