= Kaicheng, Anhui =

Kaicheng 开城镇
- Town
- Interactive map of Kaicheng
- Coordinates: 31°17′13″N 117°44′22″E
- Country: People's Republic of China
- Province: Anhui
- Prefecture-level city: Wuhu
- County: Wuwei
- Time zone: UTC+8 (China Standard)

Kaicheng (simplified Chinese: 开城; traditional Chinese: 開城; pinyin: Kāichéng) is a town of Shou County in southeastern Anhui province, China, located approximately halfway between Chao Lake and the Yangtze River. It has 2 residential communities (社区) and 8 villages under its administration.
