= 1975 Banqiao Dam failure =

Failure of multiple dams in China

- Flooded area of 1975 Banqiao Dam failure
- Date: August 8–10, 1975
- Location: Henan, China
- Cause: Typhoon Nina, engineering flaws, failures in policy
- Deaths: 26,000–240,000
- Property damage: 62 dams collapsed; More than 5 million houses collapsed; 10.75 million people affected

1975 Banqiao Dam failure
- Traditional Chinese: 河南「75·8」水庫潰壩
- Simplified Chinese: 河南「75·8」水库溃坝
Transcriptions
Standard Mandarin
- Hanyu Pinyin: Hénán 75/8 shuǐkù kuì bà

In August 1975, the Banqiao Dam and 61 others throughout Henan, China, collapsed following the landfall of Typhoon Nina. The ensuing flood was among the deadliest floods in China and was the third-deadliest flood in history. It affected 12,000 km^{2} (3 million acres) with a total population of 10.15 million, including around 30 cities and counties, with estimates of the death toll ranging from 26,000 to 240,000. The flood also caused the collapse of 5 million to 6.8 million houses. The dam failure took place in the context of the Cultural Revolution.

Many of the dams that collapsed were originally constructed with the help of Soviet advisors. Many were built during the Great Leap Forward. The construction of the dams focused heavily on the goal of retaining water and overlooked their capacities to prevent floods, while the quality of the dams was also compromised due to the Great Leap Forward. The Banqiao dam had been designed for a calculated one in a thousand year rainfall event of 300 mm per day; however, more than the normal yearly rainfall (1,060 mm) fell in just one day near the typhoon center. Some experts have also stated that the focus on peasant steel production during the Great Leap Forward, as well as a number of policies from the campaign to "Learn from Dazhai in agriculture", severely damaged the ecosystem and forest cover in the region, which was a major cause of the flood, and the government's mishandling of the dam failure contributed to its severity.

In the aftermath, various elements of the Chinese government concealed the details of the disaster until the 1990s, when the book The Great Floods in China's History (中国历史大洪水), prefaced by former Minister of Water Resources Qian Zhengying, revealed details of the disaster to the public for the first time. The official documents of the disaster were declassified in 2005 by the Chinese government.

== Background ==
=== Construction ===
Starting in the early 1950s, three major reservoirs and dams, including the Banqiao, Shimantan and Baisha dams, were under construction in Zhumadian. The long-term project, under the name of "Harness the Huai River", was launched to prevent flooding and to utilize the water for irrigation and generating electricity.

At the time, Chinese construction workers had no experience with building major reservoirs and, as a result, the design and construction was completely under the guidance of experts from the Soviet Union. The design of the dams overly focused on the purpose of water storage while overlooking the capacities of preventing floods. Hydrological data was lacking, and the reservoir was designed to handle a 'once in 1000 years' 306 mm of daily rainfall and 530 mm of rainfall in 3 days.

By 1953, the construction work at the three reservoirs was completed, but a "reinforcement" project on Banqiao and Shimantan dams was further carried out from 1955 to 1956 following the instructions of the Soviet Union. After renovations, the Banqiao dam was known as the "Iron Dam" to reflect its invincibility.

==== Great Leap Forward ====
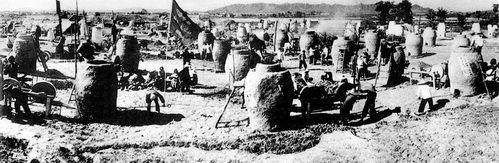
The backyard furnaces used to produce steel in Xinyang, Henan during the Great Leap Forward

After the Great Leap Forward was launched by Mao Zedong, over 100 dams were built in the Zhumadian region from 1957 to 1959. Tan Zhenlin, then Vice Premier of the People's Republic of China, issued the guidelines on reservoir construction during his trip to Henan Province: "focusing on retaining water, building more small reservoirs". At the time, "retaining more water" meant "more revolutionary".

On the other hand, the intense production of steel during the Great Leap Forward as well as the "Learn from Dazhai in agriculture" program launched by Mao severely damaged the ecosystem in the Zhumadian region. The percentage of forest cover dropped drastically and land degradation was prevalent, which, according to most experts, were the major causes of floods.

==== Whistleblowers ====
Chen Xing, then chief engineer of the dam projects, opposed the ideas of constructing too many dams as well as prioritizing the goal of "retaining water". He pointed out that the local geographical conditions made it unreasonable to overly emphasize the reservoir's function of water storage, because otherwise there was risk of creating serious floods and other disasters, such as alkalinization of farm land. Nevertheless, Chen's warning was ignored and he was criticized for being a "rightist" and "opportunist"; he was subsequently removed from his post and was sent to Xinyang.

=== Cultural Revolution ===
The collapse of the dams occurred during the Cultural Revolution (1966–1976), when most people were busy with the revolution and had little time with the dams while it was raining heavily. In fact, there were no resources or equipment available to prevent the flood.

After the disaster, Xinhua journalist Zhang Guangyou (张广友) visited the area and interviewed several experts, who were afraid to express their opinions in public lest they be condemned for "questioning the Cultural Revolution" and "questioning Chairman Mao". However, the experts told Zhang privately that the degradation and the damage to the ecosystem due to Mao's Great Leap Forward were the major causes of the collapse of the dams.

== Timeline ==
=== August 4–5 ===
According to testimonies from residents, the summer had been very dry that year, with a drought starting from July. On August 4, sudden heavy rain started, which would continue for the following days. In Queshan County, 1,100 mm of rain was measured over three days. By August 5, many smaller reservoirs already reached their storage limit. That same evening, Banqiao town, near the dam, started to flood.

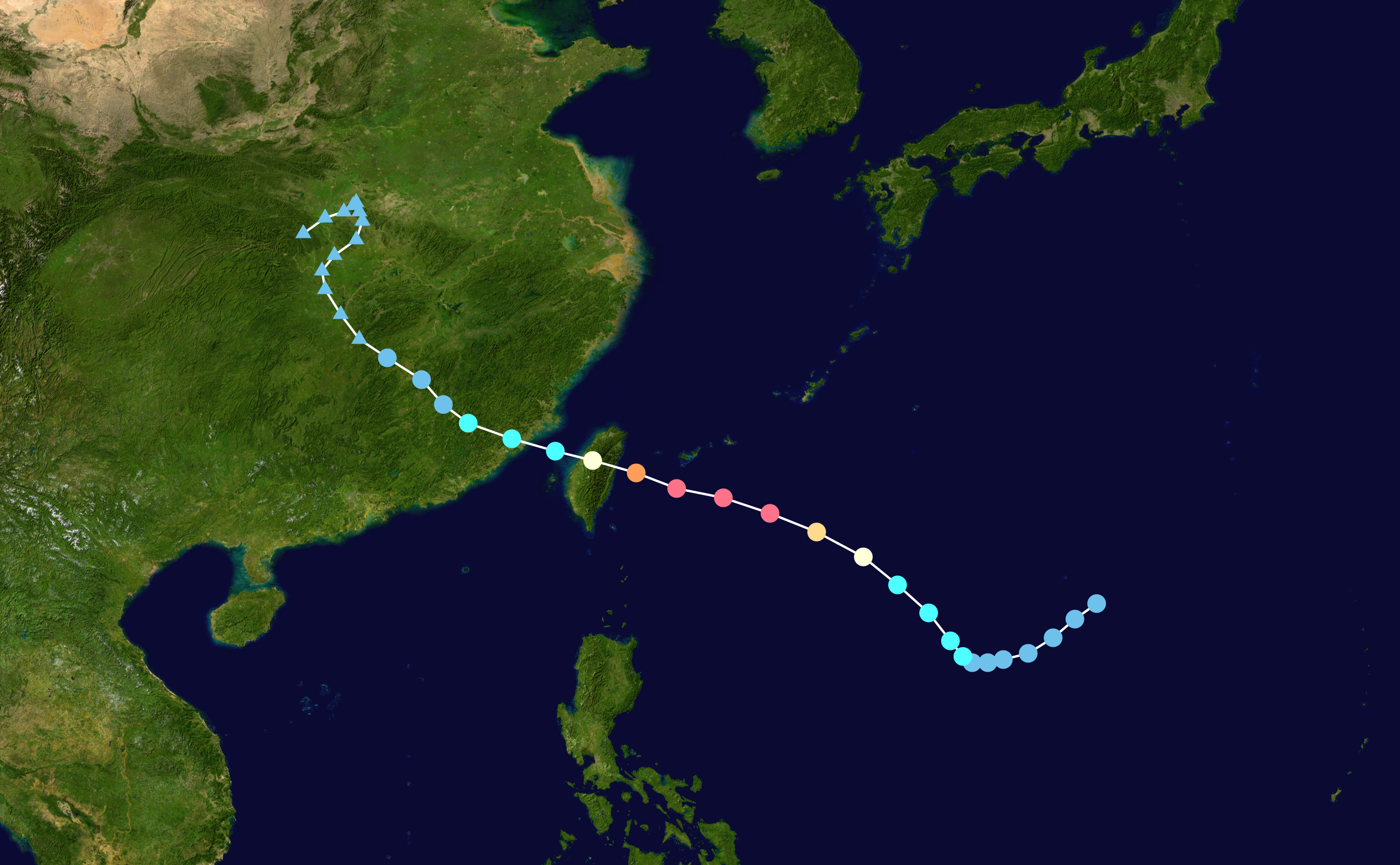
Track of Typhoon Nina in 1975

=== August 6–7 ===
By the next day, the dam control office lost communication with upstream rainfall stations, as the phone switchboard had been flooded. When officials from Banqiao town reached Zhumadian to report on the situation, the concerns were dismissed as the dam was considered invincible.

A request to open the dam was rejected because of the existing flooding in downstream areas.

On August 7 the request was accepted, but the telegrams failed to reach the dam operators. The sluice gates were not able to handle the overflow of water partially due to sedimentation blockage. At noon, local officials held an emergency meeting and found that no explosives or other equipment was available to speed up the water outflow. By 4 pm, another 13 hour rainstorm started. At 7 pm, residents of nearby downstream towns of Banqiao and Shahedian in Biyang County received evacuation notices, but those on the other side of the river in Suiping County did not.

On August 7 at 21:30, the People's Liberation Army Unit 34450 (by name the 2nd Artillery Division in residence at Queshan county), which was deployed on the Banqiao Dam, sent the first dam failure warning via telegraph.

=== August 8 ===
On August 8, at 01:00, water at Banqiao crested at 117.94 m above sea level, or 0.3 m higher than the wave protection wall on the dam, and it failed. The same storm caused the failure of 62 dams in total. The runoff of Banqiao Dam was 13,000 m^{3} per second in vs. 78,800m^{3} per second out, and as a result 701 million m^{3} of water was released in 6 hours.

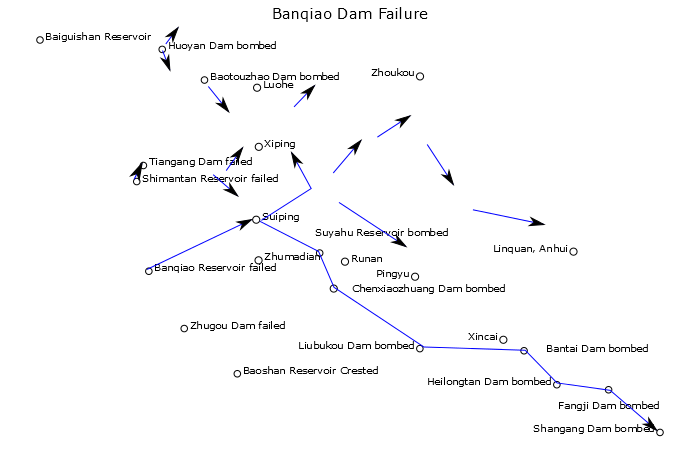
Rough diagram of water flow during the dam failure

The resulting flood waters caused a wave 10 kilometers (6.2 mi) wide and 3–7 meters (9.8–23.0 ft) high in Suiping that rushed onto the plains below at nearly 50 kilometers per hour (31 mph), almost wiping out an area 55 kilometers (34 mi) long and 15 kilometers (9.3 mi) wide, and creating temporary lakes as large as 12,000 square kilometers (4,600 sq mi). Seven county seats, Suiping, Xiping, Ru'nan, Pingyu, Xincai, Luohe, and Linquan were inundated, as were thousands of square kilometers of countryside and countless communities. Evacuation orders had not been fully delivered due to weather conditions and poor communications. Telegraphs failed, signal flares fired by Unit 34450 were misunderstood, telephones were rare, and some messengers were caught by the flood.

To protect other dams from failure, several flood diversion areas were evacuated and inundated, and several dams were deliberately destroyed by air strikes to release water in desired directions. The Nihewa and Laowangpo flood diversion areas downstream of the dams soon exceeded their capacity and gave up part of their storage on August 8, forcing more flood diversion areas to begin to evacuate.

=== August 9 ===
By August 9, the rain had stopped but the floods continued. The dikes on the Quan River collapsed in the evening of August 9, and the entire Linquan county in Fuyang, Anhui was inundated. As the Boshan Dam, with a capacity of 400 million m^{3}, crested and the water released from the failures of Banqiao and Shimantan was rushing downstream, air strikes were made against several other dams to protect the Suya Lake dam, already holding 1.2 billion m^{3} of water.

=== Following weeks ===
A total of 102 kilometers of the Jingguang Railway, a major artery from Beijing to Guangzhou, was cut for 48 days, as were other crucial communications lines. Although 42,618 People's Liberation Army troops were deployed for disaster relief, all communication to and from the cities was cut.

By August 13, the water level was still rising in Xincai and Pingyu, affecting 2 million people.

On August 17, there were still over a million people trapped by the waters, most in Shangcai County, who relied on airdrops of food or lacked food entirely, and were unreachable by disaster relief workers. It was reported that half of the airdropped food fell into the water.

Epidemics and famine devastated the trapped survivors. In Runan County alone, 320,000 out of 500,000 residents needed medical attention due to suffering from dysentery, typhoid fever, hepatitis, colds, malaria, enteritis, encephalitis, high fever, trauma, poisoning, pink eye, and other conditions.

In order to speed up the water drainage, the Bantai sluice gates near Xincai were blown up, as officials were forced to choose causing flooding in downstream Fuyang in Anhui, or exacerbating the number of victims in Henan. A further 1.5 million residents of Anhui were thus affected by the disaster. The floods only fully receded two weeks later, revealing rotting corpses everywhere.

== Aftermath ==
The damage to the Zhumadian area was estimated to be about CN¥3.5 billion (US$513 million). The Zhumadian government appealed to the whole nation for help, and received more than CN¥300 million (US$44,000,000) in donations.

=== Cover-up and declassification ===
After the disaster, the Chinese Communist Party and the Chinese government remained silent to the public, while no media were allowed to make reports.

In 1987, Yu Weimin (于为民), a journalist from Henan Daily wrote a book on the disaster, while in 1995 the news agency took the lead and published details about the disaster to the public. At the official level, The Great Floods in China's History (中国历史大洪水) revealed part of the information to the public for the first time; the book was prefaced by Qian Zhengying who served as the Minister of Water Resources of China in the 1970s and 1980s.

The official documents of this disaster were considered a state secret until 2005 when they were declassified. Scientists from China, Italy and the United States subsequently attended a seminar in Beijing, discussing the details.

=== Casualties ===
Unofficial figures reported that 85,600–240,000 people died as a result of the dam breaking, although the official figure is 26,000. For example, while only 827 out of 6,000 people died in the evacuated community of Shahedian just below Banqiao Dam, half of a total of 36,000 people died in the unevacuated Wencheng commune of Suipin County next to Shahedian, and the Daowencheng Commune was wiped from the map, killing all 9,600 citizens.

- In August 1975, preliminary figures from the Committee of Communist Party in Henan stated that there were 85,600 people from Henan who died in the disaster, while the total death toll did not exceed 100,000 taking account of the people from outside the province. The Committee believed that the figures were relatively accurate and made a report to the Central Committee of the Chinese Communist Party.
- In the 1980s, several representatives of the Chinese People's Political Consultative Conference including Qiao Peixin (乔培新), Sun Yueqi (孙越崎), Lin Hua (林华), Qian Jiaju (千家驹), Wang Xingrang (王兴让), Lei Tianjue (雷天觉), Xu Chi (徐驰) and Lu Qinkan (陆钦侃) revealed that the death toll of the 1975 Banqiao Dam failure was 230,000.
- In the 1990s, The Great Floods in China's History revealed that approximately 26,000 people died in the province from flooding; in addition, about 5,960,000 buildings collapsed, and 11 million residents were affected. Interestingly, Luo ChengZheng (骆承政), one of the authors of the book, wrote "85,600 people died in the Banqiao Dam failure in 1975" in one edition of the book.
- In 1995, Human Rights Watch stated in its report that the death toll was approximately 230,000.
- In 2005, the Discovery Channel show Ultimate 10 rated the Banqiao Dam failure as the greatest technological catastrophe in the world, beating the Chernobyl nuclear disaster in the Soviet Union. Discovery cited the death toll to be 240,000, which included 140,000 deaths due to famine, infections and epidemics.

=== Governmental assessment ===
The Chinese government deems the dam failure a natural one as opposed to man-made disaster, with government sources placing an emphasis on the amount of rainfall as opposed to poor engineering and construction. People's Daily has maintained that the dam was designed to survive a once-in-1000-years flood (300 mm of rainfall per day) but a once-in-2000-years flood occurred in August 1975, following the collision of Typhoon Nina and a cold front. The typhoon was blocked for two days before its direction ultimately changed from northeastward to westward. As a result of this near stationary thunderstorm system, more than a year's worth of rain fell within 24 hours, which weather forecasts failed to predict. New records were set, at 1,060 millimetres (42 in) per day, exceeding the average annual precipitation of about 800 millimetres (31 in). China Central Television reported that the typhoon disappeared from radar as it degraded. According to Xinhua, the forecast was for rainfall of 100 mm by the Beijing-based Central Meteorological Observatory.

After the flood, a summit of National Flood Prevention and Reservoir Security at Zhengzhou, Henan was held by the Department of Water Conservancy and Electricity, and a nationwide reservoir security examination was performed.

== See also ==
- 2021 Henan floods
- History of the People's Republic of China
- List of hydroelectric power station failures
