= Banqiao Dam =

Dam in Zhumadian, Henan, China

Coordinates: 32°58′58″N 113°37′24″E

The Banqiao Reservoir Dam (simplified Chinese: 板桥水库大坝; traditional Chinese: 板橋水庫大壩; pinyin: Bǎnqiáo Shuǐkù Dàbà) is a dam on the River Ru (汝河), a tributary of the Hong River in Zhumadian City, Henan province, China. The Banqiao dam and Shimantan Reservoir Dam (simplified Chinese: 石漫滩水库大坝; traditional Chinese: 石漫灘水庫大壩; pinyin: Shímàntān Shuǐkù Dàbà) are among 62 dams in Zhumadian that failed catastrophically in 1975 during Typhoon Nina. The dam was subsequently rebuilt.

== History ==
=== Construction ===
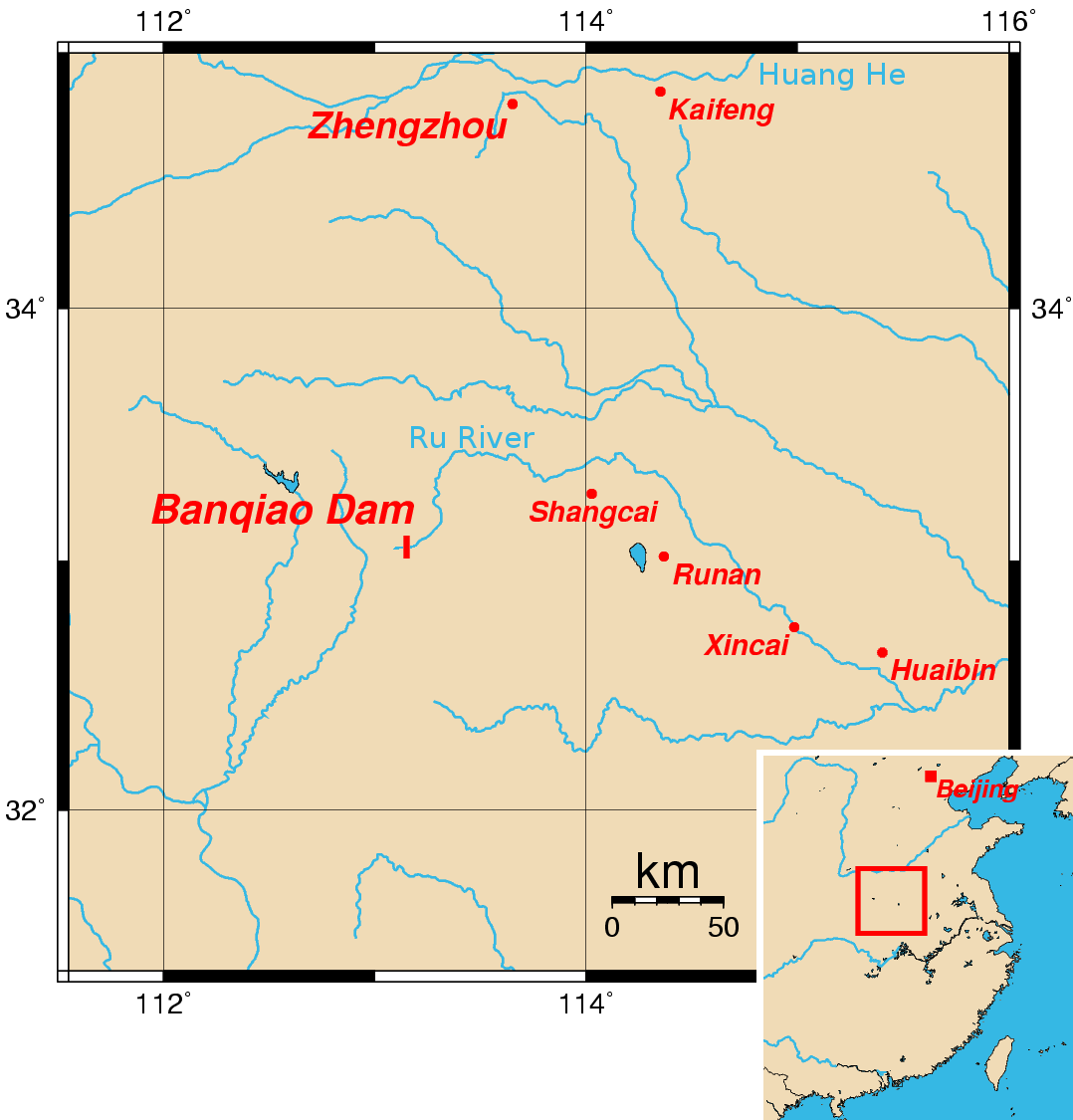
Approximate location of Banqiao Dam

Construction of the Banqiao dam began in April 1951 on the Ru River with the help of Soviet consultants as part of a project to control flooding and provide electrical power generation. The construction was a response to severe flooding in the Huai River Basin in 1949 and 1950. The dam was completed in June 1952. Because of the absence of hydrology data, the design standard was lower than usual. After the 1954 Huai River great flood, the upstream reservoirs including Banqiao were extended, constructed, and consolidated. Banqiao Dam was increased in height by 3 meters (9.8 ft). The dam crest level was 116.34 meters (381.7 ft) above sea level and the crest level of the wave protection wall was 117.64 meters (386.0 ft) above sea level. The total capacity of the reservoir was 492 million m^{3} (398,000 acre feet), with 375 million m^{3} (304,000 acre feet) reserved for flood storage. The dam was made of clay and was 24.5 meters (80 ft) high. The maximum discharge of the reservoir was 1,742 m^{3} (61,500 cu ft) per second.

Cracks in the dam and sluice gates appeared after completion due to construction and engineering errors. They were repaired with the advice from Soviet engineers and the new design, dubbed the iron dam, was considered unbreakable.

==== Whistle-blower ====
Chen Xing (陈惺), one of China's foremost hydrologists, was involved in the design of the dam but he was also a vocal critic of the government's dam building policy and project which involved many dams in the basin. He had recommended 12 sluice gates for the Banqiao Dam but this was criticized as being excessive and the number was reduced to five. Other dams in the project, including the Shimantan Dam, had a similar reduction of safety features and Chen was removed from the project. In 1961, after problems with the water system were revealed, Chen was brought back to help. He continued to be an outspoken critic of the system and was again removed from the project.

=== 1975 Banqiao Dam failure ===
In August 1975, the Banqiao Dam and 61 others throughout Henan, China, collapsed following the landfall of Typhoon Nina. The ensuing flood was among the deadliest floods in China, and was the third-deadliest flood in history which affected 12,000 km^{2} (3 million acres) with a total population of 10.15 million, including around 30 cities and counties, with estimates of the death toll ranging from 26,000 to 240,000. The flood also caused the collapse of 5 million to 6.8 million houses. The dam failure took place in the context of the Cultural Revolution.

Many of the dams that collapsed were originally constructed with the help of Soviet advisors. Many were built during the Great Leap Forward. The construction of the dams focused heavily on the goal of retaining water and overlooked their capacities to prevent floods, while the quality of the dams was also compromised due to the Great Leap Forward. The Banqiao dam had been designed for a calculated one in a thousand year rainfall event of 300 mm per day; however, more than the normal yearly rainfall (1,060 mm) fell in just one day near the typhoon center. Some experts have also stated that the focus on peasant steel production during the Great Leap Forward, as well as a number of policies from the campaign to "Learn from Dazhai in agriculture", severely damaged the ecosystem and forest cover in the region, which was a major cause of the flood, and the government's mishandling of the dam failure contributed to its severity.

In the aftermath, various elements of the Chinese government concealed the details of the disaster until the 1990s, when the book The Great Floods in China's History (中国历史大洪水), prefaced by former Minister of Water Resources Qian Zhengying, revealed details of the disaster to the public for the first time. The official documents of the disaster were declassified in 2005 by the Chinese government.

=== Reconstruction ===
Within eleven years of the dam failure, the lower reach of the River Ru, esp. Zhumadian City, experienced several more disastrous floods. After many feasibility studies, the new Banqiao Reservoir reconstruction was listed as a key national project of The Seventh Five-Year Plan of China. The project owner was Huai River Water Resources Commission. The construction contractor was Changjiang Gezhouba Engineering Bureau. By the end of 1986, the rebuilding project commenced. On June 5, 1993, the project was certified by the Chinese government.

The reconstructed Banqiao Reservoir controls a catchment area of 768 km^{2} (297 sq mi). The maximum reserve capacity is 675 million m^{3} (178 billion gallons), a capacity increase of 34% above the capacity of the failed dam. The effective storage is 256 million m^{3} (67.6 billion gallons) and the corresponding normal high water level is 111.5 m (366 ft) above sea level. The flood control storage is 457 million m^{3} (121 billion gallons). The dam is made of clay and is 3,720 m (12,200 ft) long and 50.5 m (166 ft) high. The dam crest level is 120 m (390 ft) above sea level. The maximum discharge of the reservoir is 15,000 m^{3} (530,000 cu ft) per second.

== Legacy ==
After the disaster of the Banqiao dam failure, the Chinese government became very focused on surveillance, repair, and consolidation of reservoir dams. China has 87,000 reservoirs across the country; most of which were built in the 1950s–1970s using low construction standards. Most of these reservoirs are in serious disrepair, posing challenges to the prevention and control of flood-triggered geological disasters in areas with a population of 130 million or more. China's medium and small rivers are considered to be the Achilles' heel in the country's river control systems. According to a report from 2010, by the Ministry of Water Resources, China has invested CN¥64.9 billion (US$9.72 billion) since the 1998 Yangtze River floods in repairing and consolidating the country's 9,197 degraded reservoirs, of which 2,397 are large or medium-sized, and 6,800 are key small reservoirs.

== See also ==
- List of hydroelectric power station failures
- Hydraulic engineering
- Natural disasters in China
