= Zhangxin =

Zhangxin (张新) may refer to:

- Zhangxin, Anhui, a town in Linquan County, Anhui, China
- Zhangxin Subdistrict, a subdistrict in Hengshan District, Jixi, Heilongjiang, China

== See also ==
- Zhang Xin (disambiguation) for people
