= Wang Shucheng =

Chinese politician

- 汪恕诚

Minister of Water Resources
- In office 4 November 1998 – 27 April 2007
- Premier: Zhu Rongji; Wen Jiabao
- Preceded by: Niu Maosheng
- Succeeded by: Chen Lei

Personal details
- Born: 18 December 1941 (age 84) Liyang County, Jiangsu, China
- Party: Chinese Communist Party
- Education: Tsinghua University

Chinese name
- Simplified Chinese: 汪恕诚
- Traditional Chinese: 汪恕誠
Transcriptions
Standard Mandarin
- Hanyu Pinyin: Wāng Shùchéng

Wang Shucheng (Chinese: 汪恕诚; born 18 December 1941) is a Chinese politician who served as minister of Water Resources from 1998 to 2007. He was a delegate to the 11th National People's Congress and a member of the 16th Central Committee of the Chinese Communist Party.

== Biography ==
Wang was born in Liyang County (now Liyang), Jiangsu, on 18 December 1941. In 1959, he entered Tsinghua University, where he studied alongside Hu Jintao.

He joined the Chinese Communist Party (CCP) in April 1965. Starting in April 1968, he successively served as deputy secretary of the CCP First Work Area Committee of the Sixth Engineering Bureau, deputy secretary of CCP Sixth Hydropower Engineering Bureau Committee, deputy secretary of the CCP Water Resources and Hydropower Construction Corporation Committee, deputy director of Hydropower Construction Bureau, and director of Water Resources and Hydropower Construction Bureau. In May 1988, he became director of Hydropower Development Department of the Ministry of Energy, a post he kept until April 1993, when he was elevated to minister of Electric Power Industry. He also served as deputy general manager of the State Power Corporation of China from January 1997 to October 1998. He was chosen as minister of Water Resources in October 1998, and served until April 2007. In March 2008, he took office as vice chairperson of the National People's Congress Financial and Economic Affairs Committee.

Government offices
Preceded by Niu Maosheng	Minister of Water Resources; 1998–2007	Succeeded by Chen Lei
