= Zhang Xin (disambiguation) =

Zhang Xin (born 1965) is the CEO of SOHO China.

Zhang Xin may also refer to:

- Zhang Xin (footballer) (born 1992), Chinese International footballer
- Zhang Xin (writer) (born 1954), Chinese author
- Zhang Xin (skier) (born 1985), Chinese freestyle skier
- Xin Zhang (engineer), Chinese-born mechanical engineering researcher at Boston University, USA
- Zhang Xin (skateboarder), Chinese skateboarder

== See also ==
- Zhangxin (disambiguation) for places
- Zhang Xing (born 1986), Chinese handball player
