= Yang Zhenhuai =

Chinese politician (1928–2024)

- 杨振怀

Minister of Water Resources
- In office 12 April 1988 – 29 March 1993
- Premier: Li Peng
- Preceded by: Qian Zhengying
- Succeeded by: Niu Maosheng

Personal details
- Born: September 1928 Hefei County, Anhui, China
- Died: 19 October 2024 (aged 96) Beijing, China
- Party: Chinese Communist Party
- Education: Shanghai Jiao Tong University

Chinese name
- Simplified Chinese: 杨振怀
- Traditional Chinese: 楊振懷
Transcriptions
Standard Mandarin
- Hanyu Pinyin: Yáng Zhènhuái

Yang Zhenhuai (Chinese: 杨振怀; September 1928 – 19 October 2024) was a Chinese politician who served as Minister of Water Resources from 1988 to 1993.

Yang was an alternate member of the 14th Central Committee of the Chinese Communist Party. He was a member of the 7th National Committee of the Chinese People's Political Consultative Conference. He was a member of the Standing Committee of the 8th National People's Congress and 9th National People's Congress.

== Early life and education ==
Yang was born in Hefei County (now Hefei), Anhui, in September 1928, and graduated from Shanghai Jiao Tong University in 1950. His cousin Yang Zhenning is a physicist and Nobel laureate.

== Career ==
Yang joined the Chinese Communist Party (CCP) in May 1950. In 1954, he was assigned to Beidahuang as captain of the Mulinghe Water Conservancy Work Team at the Shenyang Design Institute of the Ministry of Water Resources. Two years later, he was promoted to director and engineer of the Water Engineering Department of Harbin Design Institute. After 1959, he became director and then vice president of the Water Engineering Office of Heilongjiang Provincial Water Conservancy Design Institute.

In 1966, the Cultural Revolution broke out, he suffered political persecution and was sent to the May Seventh Cadre Schools to do farm works. He was reinstated in 1974.

Yang was transferred to Beijing in 1979 and appointed director and senior engineer of the Water Resources Research Institute of the Water Resources and Hydropower Science Research Academy and subsequently deputy director and chief engineer of the Haihe Water Conservancy Commission in 1982. In 1983, he became vice minister of water resources and electric power (later reshuffled as Ministry of Water Resources), rising to minister in 1988. In March 1993, he took office as vice chairperson of the Agriculture and Rural Affairs Committee of the National People's Congress.

On 19 October 2024, Yang died in Beijing at the age of 96.

Government offices
Preceded by Qian Zhengying	Minister of Water Resources; 1988–1993	Succeeded by Niu Maosheng
