= Chen Xing (hydrologist) =

Chinese hydrologist

- 陈惺
- Born: July 1921; Nanjing, Jiangsu, China
- Died: May 15, 2009 (aged 87)
- Occupation: Hydrologist

Chen Xing (Chinese: 陈惺; July 1921 – 15 May 2009) was a Chinese hydrologist who was involved in the design of the Banqiao Dam.

Chen was born in Nanjing and was a vocal critic and whistle-blower of the government dam building policy, which involved many dams in the basin. He had recommended 12 sluice gates for the Banqiao Dam, but this was scaled back to 5. Other dams Chen participated in designing, including the Shimantan Dam, had similar reductions of safety features and he was eventually removed from the project. In 1961, after problems with the water system surfaced, he was brought back to help. Chen continued to be an outspoken critic of the system and was again removed from the project.

In August 1975, both the Banqiao and Shimantan dams failed due to Super Typhoon Nina, as Chen had warned. Their failure destroyed 60 more dams downstream.

In the 1980s, Chen participated in the Agri-Energy Roundtable (AER), attending and speaking at several conferences on the world stage and becoming the first Chinese to join AER's board. In 1984 Chen worked with his provincial governor, He Zhukang, to invite an international investment mission—later organized by AER—which proved successful in attracting world attention to the resources and opportunities in central China.

He died in May 2009 at the age of 87.

== See also ==
- Banqiao Dam
- 1975 Banqiao Dam failure
