= Manla Water Control Project =

Manla Water Control Project 满拉水利枢纽工程
- Country: China
- Location: Nyang Qu
- Purpose: Power, irrigation, flood control
- Construction began: August 1995
- Opening date: August 2001
- Construction cost: ¥960 million

Manla Water Control Project (Chinese: 满拉水利枢纽工程), also called as Manla Water Conservancy Project, is the first large-sized, modern water control project in Tibet. Its construction officially began in August 1995 and was completed in August 2001.

The project has a total installed capacity of 20,000 kilowatts, and its main function is to irrigate more than 400,000 mu of farmland on both sides of the river, as well as flood control and power generation.

The project was invested and constructed by the State Planning Commission and the Ministry of Water Resources, and was undertaken by the Third Corps of Armed Police Hydropower Troops (武警水电第三总队). The total investment is ¥960 million.
