= Chen Lei =

Chen Lei may refer to:

- Chen Lei (Heilongjiang), Chinese politician, former governor of Heilongjiang
- Chen Lei (PRC Minister) (born 1954), Chinese politician, Minister of Water Resources
- Chen Lei (footballer) (born 1985), Chinese football player
- Chen Lei (musician), guitarist of the Chinese band Tang Dynasty
- Chen Lei (singer) (born 1963), Taiwanese singer

== See also ==
- Lei Chen (1897–1979), Chinese politician
- Cheng Lei
