= North China University of Water Resources and Electric Power =

University in Zhengzhou, Henan province, China

- 华北水利水电大学
- Type: Public
- Established: 1951; 75 years ago
- Location: Zhengzhou, Henan, China; 34.7813°N 113.7945°E
- Website: ncwu.edu.cn ncwu.edu.cn/ncwuenglish

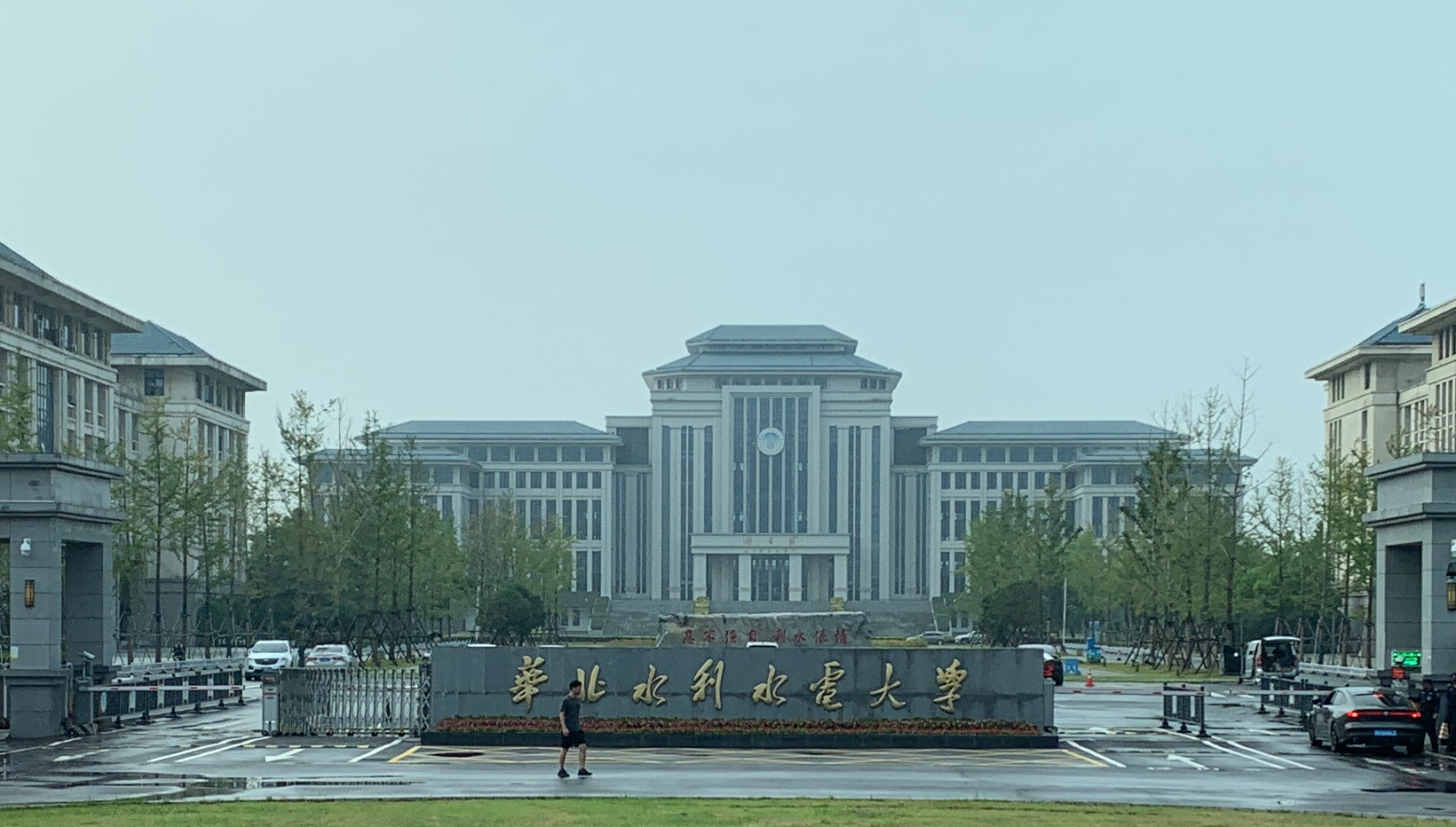
Entrance to the university in August 2024.

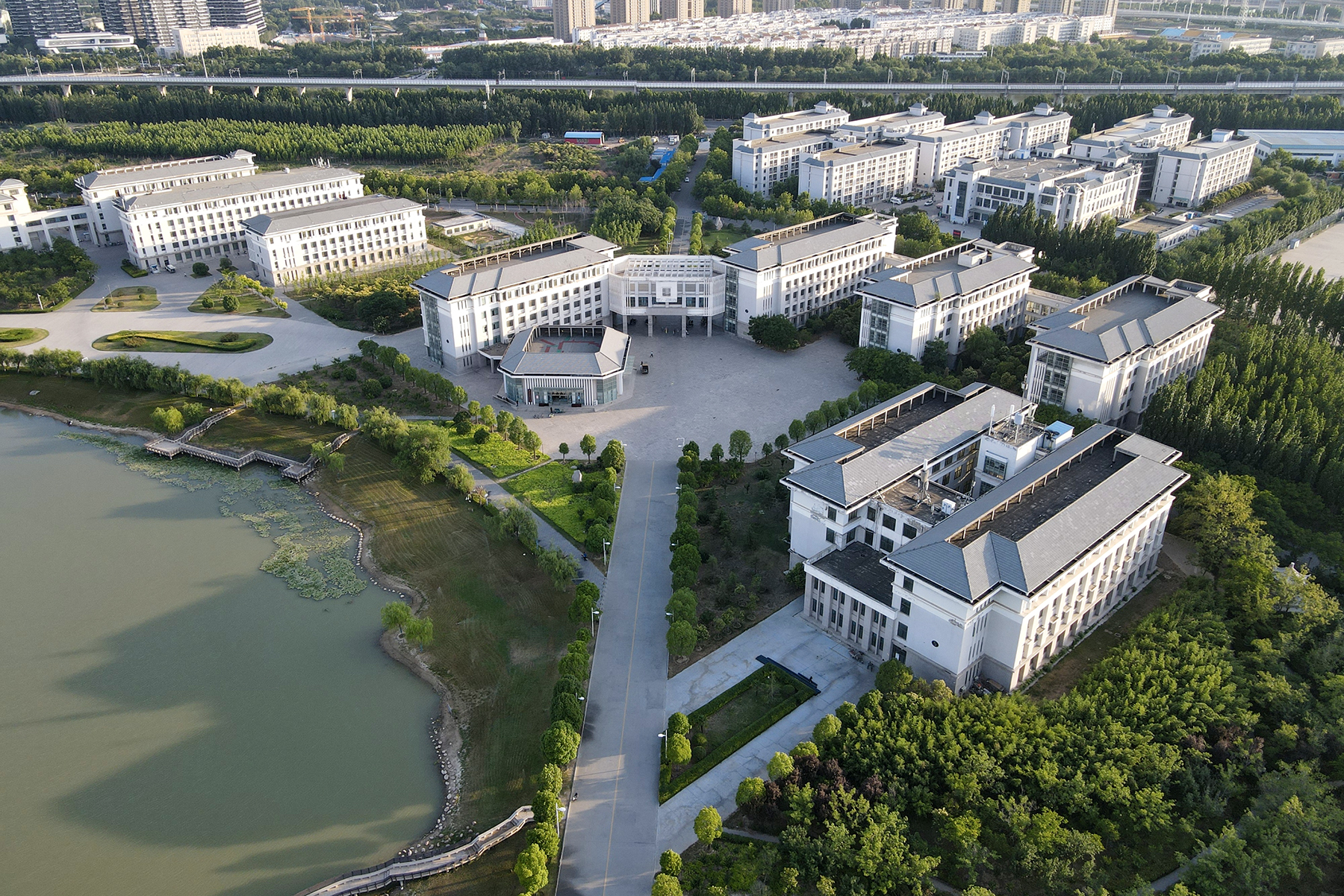
Overlook of Longzi Lake Campus of North China University of Water Resources and Hydropower (NUWRH)

The North China University of Water Resources and Electric Power (NCWU; 华北水利水电大学) is a provincial public university in Zhengzhou, Henan, China. The university is affiliated with the Province of Henan, and co-sponsored by the provincial government and the Ministry of Water Resources.

== History ==
NCWU was founded in 1951 in Beijing as the Water Conservancy School of the Ministry of Water Resources of the Central People's Government. In 1954, it was renamed the Beijing Water Conservancy School of the Ministry of Water Resources. In 1958, the Beijing Hydropower School and the Beijing Hydropower Correspondence College were merged to form the Beijing Water Conservancy and Hydropower College. In 1969, the university moved to Yuecheng Reservoir, Cixian County, Hebei Province. In 1971, the university was renamed Hebei Water Conservancy and Hydropower College. In 1977, the university was relocated to Bengbu, Hebei, and in 1978 was renamed as the North China Institute of Water Resources and Hydropower. In 1990, the university was moved for a third time to its current location in Zhengzhou, Henan. In 2000, the whole system was transferred to Henan Province by the Ministry of Water Resources. In 2009, the Ministry of Water Resources and the Henan Provincial Government signed a strategic agreement to jointly build the North China Institute of Water Resources and Hydropower. In 2013, it was renamed the North China University of Water Resources and Hydropower.

== Notable alumni ==
- E Jingping (born 1956), engineer and politician, Minister of Water Resources of China.
- Li Guoying, engineer and politician, Governor of Anhui Province.
- Liu Cixin, science fiction novelist, author of "The Three-Body Problem", Hugo Award winner, nine-time Galaxy Award winner.

== See also ==
- Energy law
