= Niu Maosheng =

Chinese politician

- 钮茂生

Governor of Hebei
- In office 6 November 1998 – 21 December 2002
- Preceded by: Ye Liansong
- Succeeded by: Ji Yunshi

Minister of Water Resources
- In office 31 March 1993 – 4 November 1998
- Premier: Li Peng
- Preceded by: Yang Zhenhuai
- Succeeded by: Wang Shucheng

Director of the Yellow River Conservancy Commission
- In office November 1987 – August 1992
- Preceded by: Gong Shiyang
- Succeeded by: Kang Chongren

Personal details
- Born: 28 October 1939 (age 86) Beiping, China
- Party: Chinese Communist Party
- Education: China Agricultural University

Chinese name
- Simplified Chinese: 钮茂生
- Traditional Chinese: 紐茂生
Transcriptions
Standard Mandarin
- Hanyu Pinyin: Niǔ Màoshēng

Niu Maosheng (Chinese: 钮茂生; born 1939) is an ethnic Manchu People's Republic of China politician.

== Biography ==
He was born in Beijing. He was governor of Hebei. He was minister of water resources (1993–1998). He was a delegate to the 9th National People's Congress.

Government offices
Preceded by Gong Shiyang	Director of the Yellow River Conservancy Commission; 1987–1992	Succeeded by Kang Chongren
Preceded by Yang Zhenhuai	Minister of Water Resources; 1993–1998	Succeeded by Wang Shucheng
Preceded by Ye Liansong	Governor of Hebei	Succeeded by Ji Yunshi
