= E Jingping =

Chinese engineer and politician

- 鄂竟平

Minister of Water Resources
- In office 19 March 2018 – 28 February 2021
- Premier: Li Keqiang
- Preceded by: Chen Lei
- Succeeded by: Li Guoying

Vice-Minister of Water Resources
- In office August 2003 – March 2018
- Minister: Chen Lei

Personal details
- Born: January 1956 (age 70) Laoting County, Hebei, China
- Party: Chinese Communist Party
- Education: North China University of Water Resources and Electric Power

E Jingping (Chinese: 鄂竟平; pinyin: È Jìngpíng; born January 1956) is a Chinese engineer and politician who served as Minister of Water Resources from 2018 to 2021.

He was an alternate of the 18th CCP Central Committee and is a member of the 19th CCP Central Committee.

== Early life and education ==
E Jingping was born in Laoting County, Hebei in January 1956. In the heyday of the Cultural Revolution in 1973, his studies was interrupted by the Down to the Countryside Movement, he became a sent-down youth and worked in Baishan Commune of Lishu County, in northeast China's Jilin province. In September 1975, he was accepted to Jilin Hydropower School and graduated in August 1977. In January 1977 he joined the Chinese Communist Party (CCP). After graduation, he became an official in Jilin Water Conservancy Design Institute, serving in the post until September 1979, when he entered North China University of Water Resources and Electric Power.

== Career ==
After graduating in August 1983, he was assigned to the Ministry of Water Resources, he served in several posts there, including secretary, department chief and director. In June 1994 he was promoted to become director and party branch secretary of Yellow River Conservancy Commission, he remained in that positions until May 2001, when he was appointed secretary general of the Office of State Flood Control and Drought Relief Headquarters. In August 2003 he was promoted again to become vice minister of Water Resources. On 19 March 2018, he was elected minister of water resources at the first session of the 13th National People's Congress. He concurrently serving as director of the Office of the South-to-North Water Diversion Project Commission of the State Council and deputy commander of the Office of State Flood Control and Drought Relief Headquarters since July 2010.

Government offices
Preceded by Chen Lei	Minister of Water Resources; 2018–2021	Succeeded by Li Guoying
