= Changjiang Water Resources Commission =

Chinese water basin authority

The Changjiang Water Resources Commission (CWRC; simplified Chinese: 长江水利委员会; traditional Chinese: 長江水利委員會; pinyin: Chángjiāng shuǐlì wěiyuánhuì) is a river basin authority dispatched by the Ministry of Water Resources of the People's Republic of China to exercise water administrative functions in the Yangtze River Basin and other river basins of southwestern China (west to and inclusive of the Lancang River). As the legacy of the former Yangtze River Water Resources Commission that existed before founding of the People's Republic of China, the CWRC was re-established in February 1950 with its headquarters seated in Wuhan. In accordance with national legislature and the authorization from the Ministry of Water Resources, the CWRC is responsible for water administration and law enforcement, integrated water resources management (including water conserving, allocation and protection), basin planning, flood control and drought relief, river course management, key hydraulic project construction and management, river sand extraction management, soil conservation, hydrology, scientific research as well as operation and stewardship of state-owned assets.

== Organization ==
=== Administrative agencies ===
- Executive Office
- Office of Chief Engineers
- Bureau of Planning and Programming
- Bureau of Water Administration and Water Resources (Corps of Water Administrative Supervision)
- Bureau of International Cooperation, Science and Technology
- Bureau of Finance and Economy
- Bureau of Personnel, Labor and Education
- Bureau of Yangtze River Sand Extraction Management
- Bureau of Soil and Water Conservation
- Office of Yangtze River Flood Control (Bureau of River Management)
- Bureau of Project Construction and Management
- Bureau of Censorship
- Bureau of Audit
- Bureau of Retirees Service
- Labor Union Yangtze Branch

=== Special establishments ===
- Bureau of Yangtze Basin Water Resource Protection

=== Institutions ===
- Bureau of Hydrology
- Changjiang River Scientific Research Institute
- Institute of Ecological Studies for Water Project
- Bureau of Yangtze Engineering Construction
- Bureau of Lushui Experimental Hydropower Complex Management
- Yangtze Institute of Geotechnique and Survey
- Comprehensive Management Center
- Network and Information Center
- Communication and Publishing Center (Yangtze Press)
- Human Resource Development Center
- Logistics Center (Bureau)
- Central Station of Yangtze Basin Soil and Water Conservation Monitoring
- Yangtze Hospital (Schistosomiasis Prevention and Monitoring Center)
- Post of Liaison in Beijing

=== Enterprises ===
- General Corporation of Changjiang Water and Hydropower Development
- Changjiang Institute of Survey, Planning, Design and Research
- Hanjiang River Water and Hydropower Group Co., Ltd. (Bureau of Danjiangkou Hydropower Complex Management)
- Yangtze River Engineering Consulting Company
