= Tian Xuebin =

Chinese politician (born 1963)

- 田学斌

Vice Minister of the Ministry of Water Resources
- In office July 2015 – January 2024

Personal details
- Born: December 1963 (age 62) Huining County, Gansu, China
- Party: Chinese Communist Party (1984-2026, expelled)
- Education: Gansu University of Technology; Central Party School; Chinese Academy of Social Sciences

Tian Xuebin (Chinese: 田学斌; born December 1963) is a former Chinese politician, who served as the vice minister of the Ministry of Water Resources from 2015 to 2024.

== Career ==
Tian was born in Huining County, Gansu in December 1963. He enrolled to Gansu University of Technology in 1979, which majored in mechanical manufacturing technology and equipment. After gradruating in 1983, he enrolled to Gansu Provincial Agricultural Water Pump Factory. He was transferred to the organization department of the CCP Gansu Provincial Committee in 1984. Tian was enrolled to the Central Party School in 1986.

In 1989, Tian was worked at the personnel department of the National Education Commission and the General Office of the All-China Women's Federation. In 1990, he was served as the staff member and the deputy division-level researcher of the Research Office of the General Office of the Chinese Communist Party. In 1992, he was served as the secretary of the CPC General Office and the General Office of the State Council. He was served as the secretary of Wen Jiabao, the former premier of the State Council. In 2008, he served as the deputy director of the State Council Research Office.

In July 2015, Tian was appointed as the vice minister of the Ministry of Water Resources. He was resigned and retired in January 2024, but he was active as the chairman of the Chinese Society of Soil and Water Conservation until under invesigation.

== Investigation ==
On 5 January 2026, Tian was put under investigation for alleged "serious violations of discipline and laws" by the Central Commission for Discipline Inspection (CCDI), the party's internal disciplinary body, and the National Supervisory Commission, the highest anti-corruption agency of China. He was expelled from the party and dismissed from the public office on 23 July.
