= Yellow River Conservancy Commission =

Chinese government department

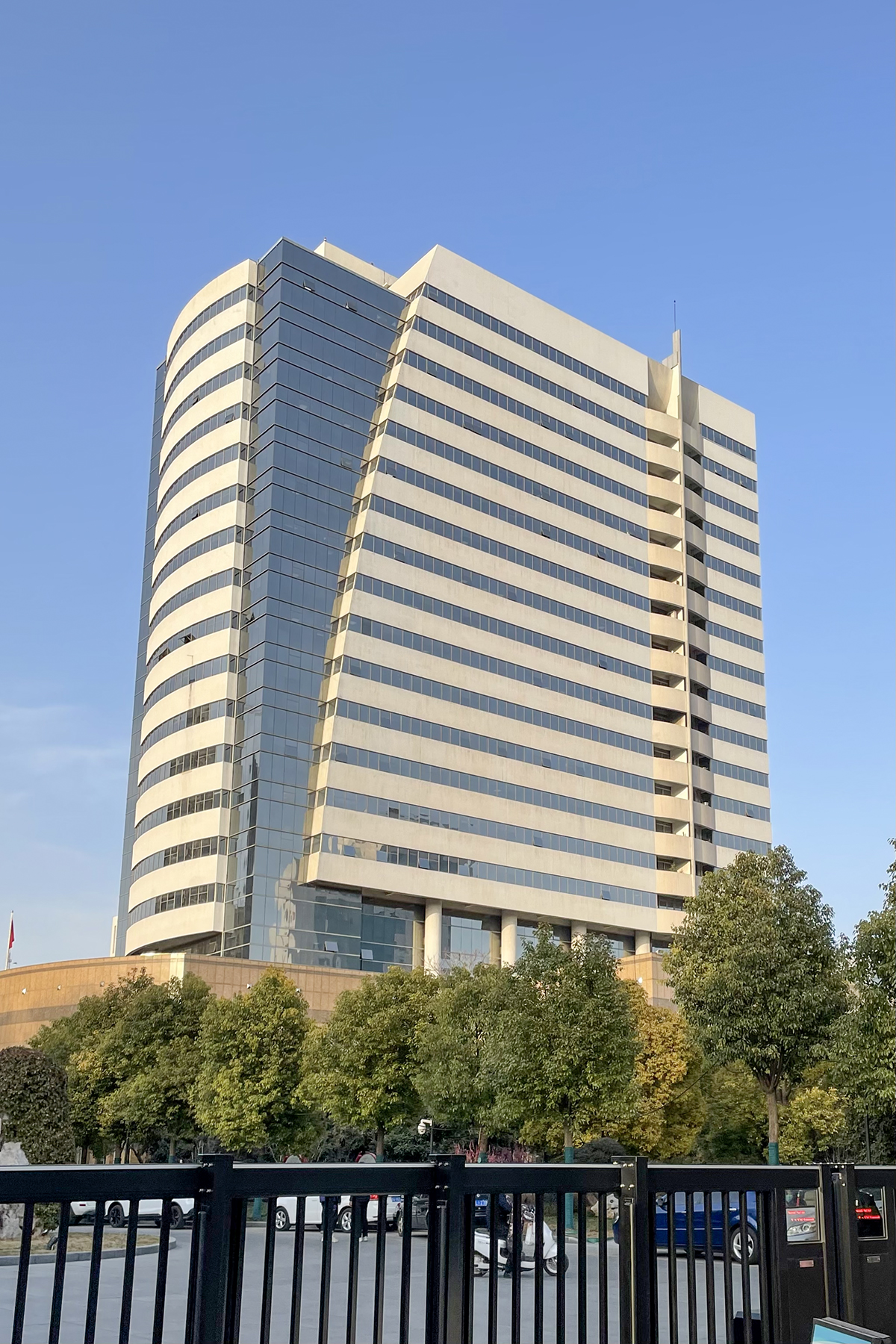
Office of the Yellow River Conservancy Commission, Xinjiang.

Yellow River Conservancy Commission (YRCC) is a government agency of Ministry of Water Resources of the People's Republic of China. YRCC takes responsibility of water administration of the Yellow River basin and the inland river basins in such provinces as Xinjiang, Qinghai, Gansu and Inner Mongolia.

== Organization ==
=== Headquarters ===
- Office of Administration, YRCC
  - Office of the Chief Engineer, YRCC
  - Department of Planning and Programming, YRCC
  - Department of Water Policy, YRCC (Water-policy Supervising Team)
  - Department of Water Resources Management and Regulation, YRCC
  - Department of Financial Affairs, YRCC
  - Department of Personnel, Labour and Education, YRCC
  - Department of International Cooperation, Science and Technology, YRCC
  - Department of Construction and Management, YRCC (Yellow River Basin Branch, Water Project Quality Control Station of the Ministry of Water Resources)
  - Department of Water and Soil Conservation, YRCC
  - The Office of Flood Control, YRCC
  - Department of Supervision, YRCC
  - Department of Auditing, YRCC
  - Department of Retirement Administration, YRCC
  - Chinese Communist Committee, YRCC
  - Yellow River Committee of Agricultural, Forestry and Water Conservancy Workers Union of China

=== Additional Unit ===
- Yellow River Basin Water Resources Protection Bureau of the Ministry of Water Resources and Ministry of Environmental Protection

=== Institutional Units ===
- Yellow River Shandong Bureau, YRCC
- Yellow River Henan Bureau, YRCC
- Upper and Middle Yellow River Bureau, YRCC
- Heihe River Bureau, YRCC
- Hydrological Bureau, YRCC
- Economic Development and Management Bureau, YRCC
- Yellow River Institute of Hydraulic Research, YRCC
- Resettlement Bureau, YRCC
- Yellow River Administrative Service Centre, YRCC
- Yellow River Central Hospital, YRCC
- Press and Publication Center, YRCC
- Information Center, YRCC
- Yellow River Xiaobeiganliu Shanxi Bureau, YRCC
- Yellow River Xiaobeiganliu Shaanxi Bureau, YRCC

=== Corporations ===
- Institute of Hydraulic Survey, Programming and Designing, YRCC
- Yellow River Mingzhu (Holding) Co. Ltd. (Management Bureau of Sanmenxia Multipurpose Project)

== Former leadership ==
Director of the Ji–Lu–Yu Yellow River Old Course Management Committee

1. Xu Daben (February 1946 – May 1946)

Director of the Ji–Lu–Yu Regional Yellow River Conservancy Commission

1. Wang Huayun (May 1946 – June 1949)

Director of the Yellow River Conservancy Commission, Ministry of Water Resources

1. Wang Huayun (June 1949 – May 1982)
2. Yuan Long (May 1982 – November 1984)
3. Gong Shiyang (November 1984 – November 1987)
4. Niu Maosheng (November 1987 – August 1992)
5. Kang Chongren (August 1992 – January 1994)
6. Qi Lian'an (January 1994 – May 1997)
7. E Jingping (May 1997 – May 2001)
8. Li Guoying (May 2001 – March 2011)
9. Chen Xiaojiang (March 2011 – August 2015)
10. Yue Zhongming (October 2015 – July 2021)
11. Wang Annan (July 2021 – August 2022)
12. Zu Leiming (October 2022 – December 2025)
