= Minister of Water Resources (China) =

Minister of the People's Republic of China

Minister of Water Resources of the People's Republic of China
- 中华人民共和国水利部部长
- National Emblem of China

- Flag of China

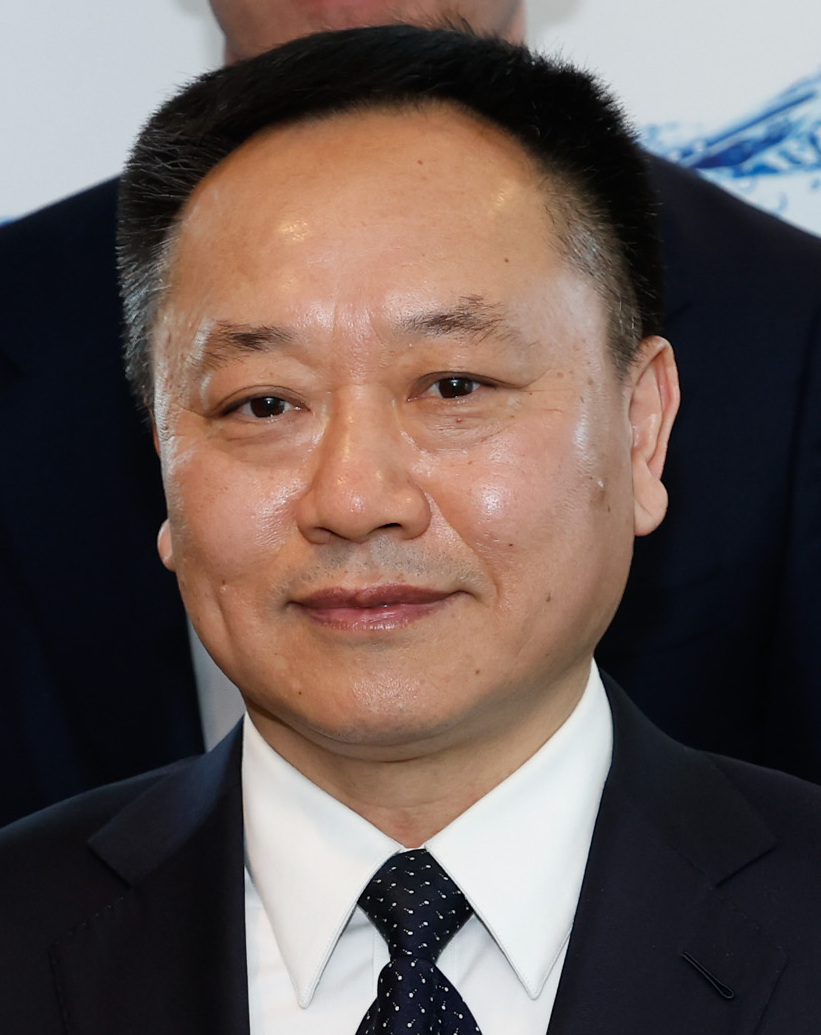
- Incumbent; Li Guoying since 28 February 2021
- Ministry of Water Resources
- Status: Provincial and ministerial-level official
- Member of: Plenary Meeting of the State Council
- Seat: Ministry of Water Resources Building, Xicheng District, Beijing
- Nominator: Premier (chosen within the Chinese Communist Party)
- Appointer: President with the confirmation of the National People's Congress or its Standing Committee
- Formation: 19 October 1949; 76 years ago
- First holder: Fu Zuoyi
- Deputy: Vice Minister of Water Resources
- Website: www.mwr.gov.cn/jg/bzzc/

The minister of water resources of the People's Republic of China is the head of the Ministry of Water Resources of the People's Republic of China and a member of the State Council. Within the State Council, the position is eighteenth in order of precedence. The minister is responsible for leading the ministry, presiding over its meetings, and signing important documents related to the ministry. Officially, the minister is nominated by the premier of the State Council, who is then approved by the National People's Congress or its Standing Committee and appointed by the president.

The current minister is Li Guoying, who concurrently serves as the Communist Party secretary of the ministry.

== History ==
The Ministry of Water Resources of the Central People's Government was established on 1 October 1949, and Fu Zuoyi became the first minister on 19 October. The ministry was reorganized to the Ministry of Water Resources of the PRC in September 1954, and the title of the minister was also changed. On 11 February 1958, the Ministry of Water resources was abolished and merged into the Ministry of Electric Power Industry, creating a new ministry called the Ministry of Water Resources and Electric Power. The former Ministry was restored 23 February 1979. On 8 March 1982, the Ministry was again abolished and merged it back to the Ministry of Water Resources and Electric Power. On 9 April 1988, the Ministry was again restored.

== List of ministers ==
No.	Portrait	Name (Birth–Death)	Term of office			Important offices held during tenure	Premier	Ref.
No.	Portrait	Name (Birth–Death)	Took office	Left office	Term	Important offices held during tenure	Premier	Ref.
Minister of Water Resources of the Central People's Government
1		Fu Zuoyi 傅作义 (1895–1974)	19 October 1949	28 September 1954	4 years, 344 days	Chairman of the Suiyuan Military and Political Committee; Commander of the PLA Suiyuan Military Region	Zhou Enlai	
Minister of Water Resources of the People's Republic of China
1		Fu Zuoyi 傅作义 (1895–1974)	28 September 1954	11 February 1958	3 years, 136 days	Vice Chairman of the National Defense Commission	Zhou Enlai	
From 11 February 1958 to 23 February 1979, the post of Minister of Water Resources was abolished.
Minister of Water Resources of the People's Republic of China
2		Qian Zhengying 钱正英 (1923–2022)	23 February 1979	8 March 1982	3 years, 13 days	Secretary of the Party Leadership Group of the Ministry of Water Resources	Hua Guofeng ↓ Zhao Ziyang	
From 8 March 1982 to 9 April 1988, the post of Minister of Water Resources was abolished.
Minister of Water Resources of the People's Republic of China
3		Yang Zhenhuai 杨振怀 (1928–2024)	9 April 1988	31 March 1993	4 years, 356 days		Li Peng	
4		Niu Maosheng 钮茂生 (born 1939)	31 March 1993	4 November 1998	5 years, 218 days	Secretary of the Party Leadership Group of the Ministry of Water Resources; Deputy Commander-in-Chief of the State Flood Control and Drought Relief Headquarters; Head of the State Council South-to-North Water Diversion Project Construction Committee	Li Peng ↓ Zhu Rongji	
5		Wang Shucheng 汪恕诚 (born 1941)	4 November 1998	27 April 2007	8 years, 174 days	Secretary of the Party Leadership Group of the Ministry of Water Resources; Deputy Commander-in-Chief of the State Flood Control and Drought Relief Headquarters	Zhu Rongji ↓ Wen Jiabao	
6		Chen Lei 陈雷 (born 1954)	27 April 2007	19 March 2018	10 years, 326 days	Secretary of the Party Leadership Group of the Ministry of Water Resources; Commander-in-Chief of the State Flood Control and Drought Relief Headquarters; Political Commissar of the People's Armed Police Force Hydropower Corps	Wen Jiabao ↓ Li Keqiang	
7		E Jingping 鄂竟平 (born 1956)	19 March 2018	28 February 2021	2 years, 346 days	Secretary of the Party Leadership Group of the Ministry of Water Resources; Commander-in-Chief of the State Flood Control and Drought Relief Headquarters	Li Keqiang	
8		Li Guoying 李国英 (born 1963)	28 February 2021	Incumbent	5 years, 192 days	Secretary of the Party Leadership Group of the Ministry of Water Resources; Commander-in-Chief of the State Flood Control and Drought Relief Headquarters	Li Keqiang ↓ Li Qiang	
