= Zhang Xin (writer) =

Chinese author based in Guangzhou (born 1954)

- Born: 1954 (age 71–72); Beijing, China
- Education: Peking University
- Writing career
- Language: Chinese
- Years active: 1978–present

Chinese name
- Traditional Chinese: 張欣
- Simplified Chinese: 张欣
Transcriptions
Standard Mandarin
- Hanyu Pinyin: Zhāng Xīn

Zhang Xin (born 1954) is a Chinese author based in Guangzhou. Several of her novels have been adapted into films and TV series.

== Works translated into English ==
Year	Chinese title	Translated English title	Translator
1992	绝非偶然	"Certainly Not by Coincidence"	Daniel B. Wright
1993	我是谁	"Portrait of Myself"	Li Ziliang
1994	首席	"Where Angels Dare to Tread"	Josephine A. Matthews
	岁月无敌	"Invincible Time"	
	一生何求	"What to Hope For?"	Yu Fanqin

== Filmography ==
=== Film ===
Year	English title	Chinese title	Notes
1996	With You at the Dawn	伴你到黎明	based on her novella of the same name
2009	The DINKs and the Baby	丁克与宝贝	

=== TV series ===
Year	English title	Chinese title	Notes
1994	So What About Love	爱又如何	based on her novel of the same name
2000	Deadly Encounter	致命邂逅	based on her novel of the same name
2001	Files of Fallen Stars	沉星档案	based on her novel of the same name
2002	Life Show	生活秀	adapted screenplay, based on her friend Chi Li's novel of the same name
2002	Behind the Vanity	浮华背后	based on her novel of the same name
2003	Change a Life-Style	换个活法	based on her novella You Have No Reasons Not to Go Insane (你没有理由不疯)
2004	Who Can I Depend On	谁可相依	based on her novel of the similar title (谁可相倚)
2004	The Vain City	浮华城市	based on her novella Affection and Love Are Insufficient for Marriage (仅有情爱是不能结婚的)
2004	My Teardrop	我的泪珠儿	based on her novel Teardrop (泪珠儿)
2006	Waves Washing the Sand	浪淘沙	based on her novel Deep Throat (深喉)
2006	Married for Love	为爱结婚	based on her novel of the same name
2008	Locking Love	锁春记	based on her novel of the same name
2009	The Wedding	嫁衣	based on her novel It's Still You (依然是你)
2010	Those Charming Past Events	那些迷人的往事	based on her novel Single-Minded Pursuit (一意孤行)
