= Chen Lei (PRC Minister) =

Chinese politician

- 陈雷
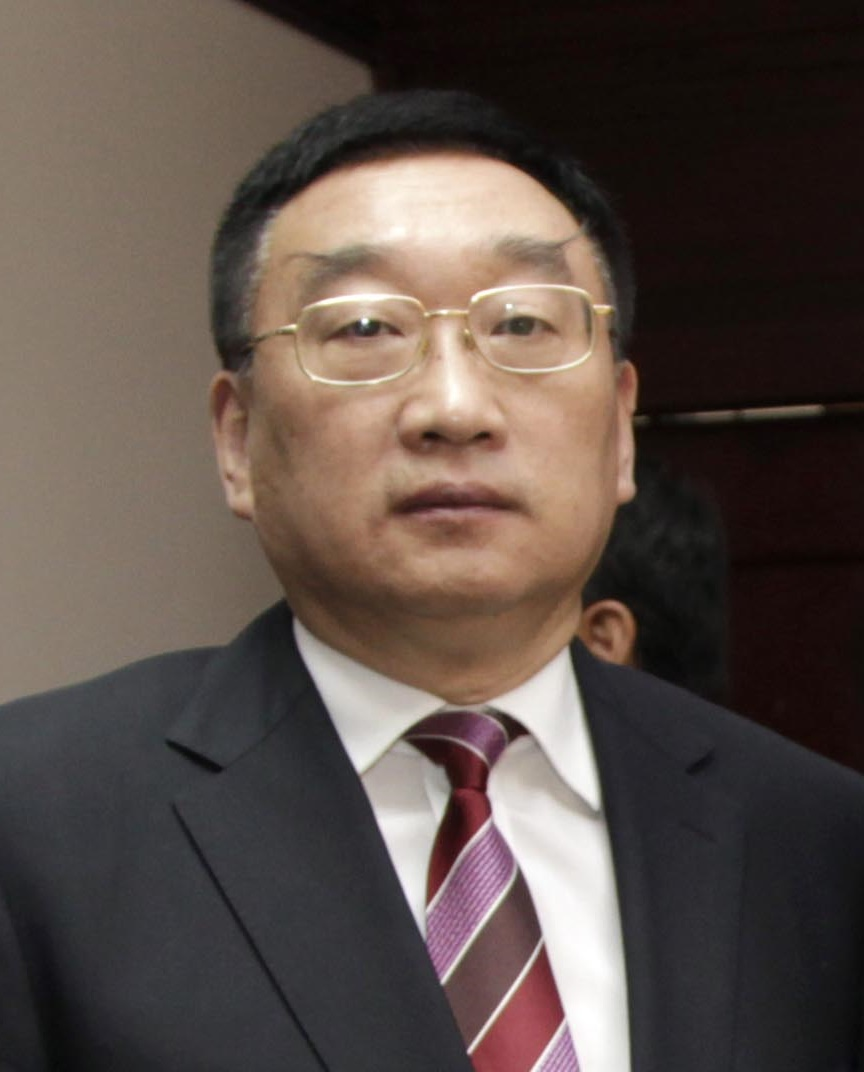
- Chen Lei in 2013

Minister of Water Resources
- In office 27 April 2007 – 19 March 2018
- Premier: Wen Jiabao; Li Keqiang
- Preceded by: Wang Shucheng
- Succeeded by: E Jingping

Personal details
- Born: 20 June 1954 (age 72) Beijing, China
- Party: Chinese Communist Party
- Education: Northeastern University (China); North China University of Water Resources and Electric Power

Chinese name
- Simplified Chinese: 陈雷
- Traditional Chinese: 陳雷
Transcriptions
Standard Mandarin
- Hanyu Pinyin: Chén Léi

Chen Lei (Chinese: 陈雷; born June 1954) is a Chinese politician who has served as Minister of Water Resources since 2007.

== Biography ==
A native of Beijing, Chen became a worker at Ningxia 905 factory in September 1971. He joined the Chinese Communist Party (CCP) in May, 1980. From December 1976 to July 1980, Chen studied at department of metal materials of Northeast Institute of Technology, majoring in powder metallurgy. After graduation, he became a teacher in the department of hydraulic engineering mechanics of North China University of Water Conservancy and Electric Power. From September 1982 to May 1985, Chen studied in the graduate school of the University in Beijing, majoring in agricultural hydraulic engineering, and obtained a master's degree. He then served in China Irrigation and Drainage Company and eventually became the general manager. In May 1995, he started serving in Ministry of Water Resources. Chen was elevated to vice Minister in May 2001. From March to May 2002, he studied at CCP Central Party School. In December 2004, Chen became a member of Three Gorge Project construction commission. In March 2005, Chen was appointed as a vice chairman of Xinjiang Uyghur Autonomous Region, and in August was elected a standing committee member of CCP Xinjiang committee. In December 2005, he became the executive vice chairman of Xinjiang, and vice secretary of political and legislative commission of Xinjiang. In April 2007, Chen was appointed Minister of Water Resources.

Chen was a member of the 17th and 18th Central Committees of the CPC.

Government offices
Preceded by Wang Shucheng	Minister of Water Resources; 2007–2018	Succeeded by E Jingping
