= Li Guoying =

Chinese politician

- 李国英
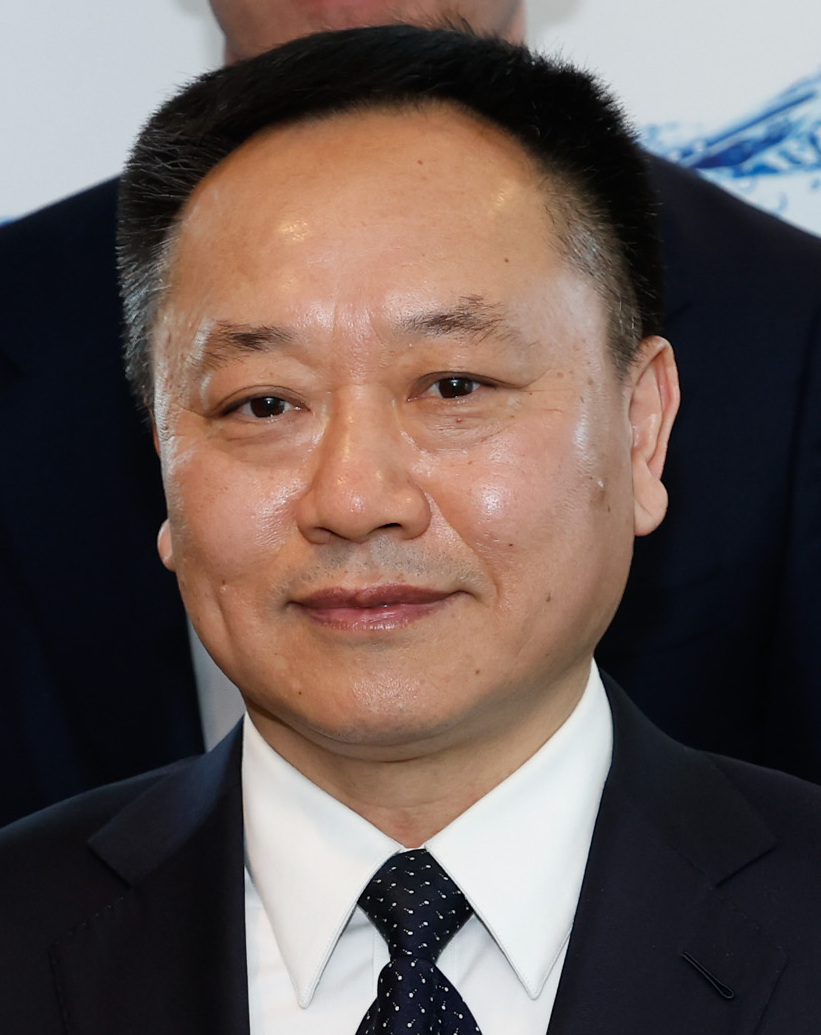

Minister of Water Resources
- Incumbent
- Assumed office February 28, 2021
- Premier: Li Keqiang; Li Qiang
- Preceded by: E Jingping

Governor of Anhui
- In office September 1, 2016 – February 1, 2021
- Preceded by: Li Jinbin
- Succeeded by: Wang Qingxian

Personal details
- Born: December 1963 (age 62) Yuzhou, Henan, China
- Party: Chinese Communist Party (CCP)
- Education: North China University of Water Conservancy and Electric Power

Chinese name
- Traditional Chinese: 李國英
- Simplified Chinese: 李国英
Transcriptions
Standard Mandarin
- Hanyu Pinyin: Lǐ Guóyīng

Li Guoying (Chinese: 李国英; born December 1963) is a Chinese politician, currently serving as the minister of water resources. He was previously the governor of Anhui. A hydraulic engineer by profession, Li worked in his early career as a technician and administrator in the national ministry of water works, the Yellow River Commission, and in Heilongjiang province. He was transferred to Anhui in 2015 to serve as deputy party secretary before becoming acting governor in 2016.

== Biography ==
He was born in Yuzhou, Henan province. He studied hydroelectric power generation and engineering at North China University of Water Conservancy and Electric Power in Zhengzhou and graduated with a bachelor's degree in 1984. He also had a graduate degree in philosophy from the Central Party School of the Chinese Communist Party, then a doctorate from Northeast Normal University in environmental science.

After graduating university, Li worked for the Yellow River commission of the Ministry of Water Works as a survey technician for the planning and research department. He spent most of his career in the water works system, as the assistant to the chief engineer, then the deputy director of the Yellow River commission, then chief engineer of the national Ministry of Waterworks. He was then transferred in May 1999 to head the department of water works in Heilongjiang.

In March 2011, he was named Vice Minister of Water Works and chairman of the Yellow River Commission; he stayed on the post until August 2015, when he was named deputy party secretary of Anhui. He was then elevated to acting governor a year later, on September 1, 2016. His elevation confirmed trends that the senior Communist Party leadership was again showing preference for engineering and technical backgrounds over lifelong apparatchiks. At the time of his appointment Li, 52, was the second youngest governor in China. He was confirmed as governor in a legislative session on January 21, 2017.

Li was an alternate of the 18th Central Committee of the Chinese Communist Party and was a full member of the 19th Central Committee.

== Plans and projects ==
=== Reservoir self-suction sediment transport piping method ===
The "Central No. 1 Document" from 2011 emphasized that improving water management and reducing water disasters are crucial for national security. It proposed increasing investments in water conservation over the next ten years compared to 2010. As Director of the Yellow River Water Resources Committee, Li Guoying stated that the Xiaolangdi reservoir's sediment would be managed using natural methods. A proposed sediment transport device would require low investment, be efficient, have low operating costs, and be durable. Many research papers in China discuss this transport piping method, highlighting its efficiency, extensive capability, cost-effectiveness compared to machine cleaning, simple design, and ease of control.

=== Xiong'an New Area ===
The Xiong'an New Area plan, a 2017 plan revealed by CCP general secretary Xi Jinping to create an eco-friendly, high-tech urban hub near Beijing, raised questions about its ability to handle environmental challenges like flooding and drought.

In late July 2023, China's flood control officials met to ensure the safety of Beijing and Xiong'an amid heavy rains. Li, as Minister of Water Resources, ordered flood diversion plans to protect Xiong'an from storms that same month.

=== Guxian Water Conservancy Project ===
In July 2024, construction has started on a new dam on China's Yellow River to manage sediment as revealed by the Ministry of Water Resources. The Guxian Water Conservancy Project is located between the Shaanxi and Shanxi provinces. Li stated that the Guxian project is important for sediment control and the national water network, ensuring security for the Yellow River's middle and lower reaches.

== Selected publications ==
- Li, Guoying; Sheng, Lianxi (2011-04-01). "Model of water-sediment regulation in Yellow River and its effect". Science China Technological Sciences. 54 (4): 924–930. Bibcode:2011ScChE..54..924L. doi:10.1007/s11431-011-4322-3. ISSN 1862-281X.

Government offices
| Preceded by Zhu Erming | Chief Engineer of the Ministry of Water Resources; 1998–1999 | Succeeded by Gao Anze |
| Preceded by Feng Zhaoying | Head of Heilongjiang Provincial Water Resources Department; 1999–2001 | Succeeded by Xiao You |
| Preceded by E Jingping | Director of Yellow River Conservancy Commission; 2001–2011 | Succeeded by Chen Xiaojiang |
| Preceded by Li Jinbin | Governor of Anhui; 2016–2021 | Succeeded by Wang Qingxian |
| Preceded by E Jingping | Minister of Water Resources; 2021–present | Incumbent |
Party political offices
| Preceded by Li Jinbin | Deputy Communist Party Secretary of Anhui; 2015–2016 | Succeeded by Xin Changxing |
