= Quan River =

Quan River Fen River
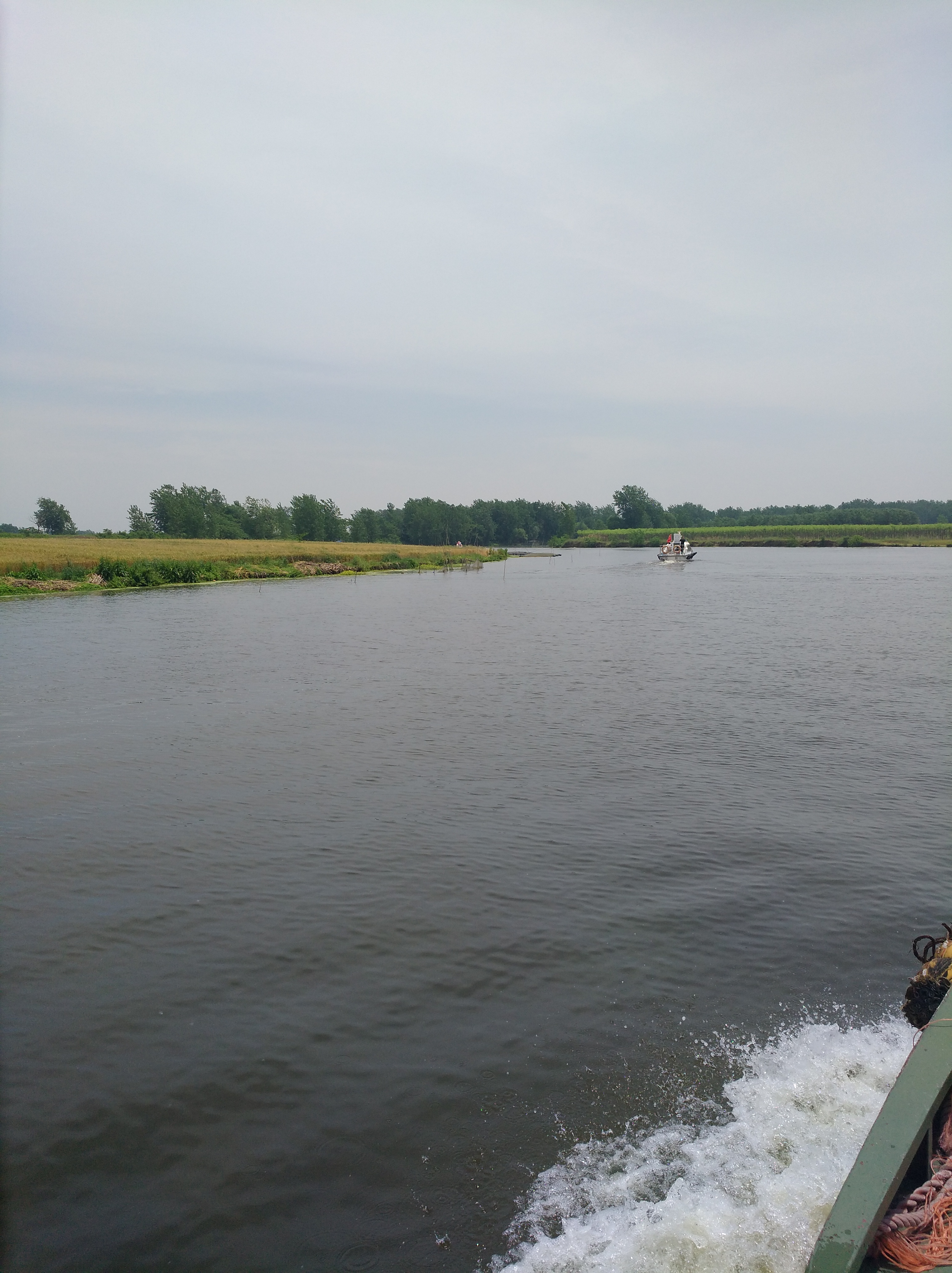

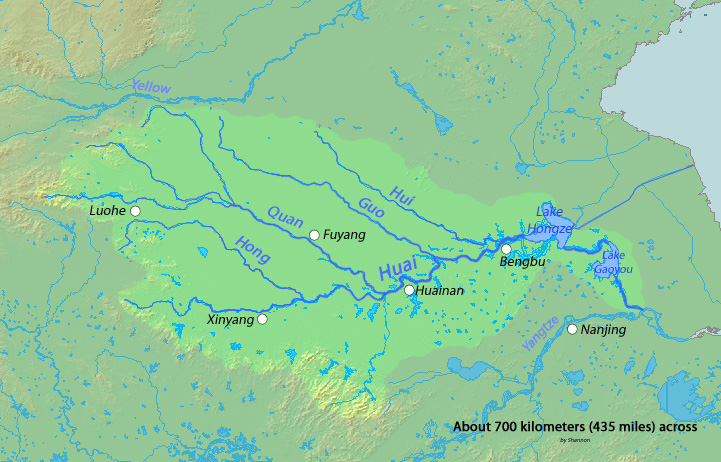
- Map showing the Quan River and Huai River
- Native name: 泉河 (Chinese)

Location
- Country: China
- Region: Northern China and Eastern China
- Cities: Fuyang, Jieshou, Luohe, Shangshui, Shenqiu, Linquan

Physical characteristics
- Source
  - location: Shaoling District of Luohe, Henan province, China
- Mouth: Ying River
  - location: Near the Fuyang, Anhui province, China
  - coordinates: 32°54′24″N 115°50′09″E
- Length: 149.7 mi (240.9 km), Northwest-Southeast
- Basin size: 2,031 sq mi (5,260 km^{2})

Basin features
- River system: Huai River watershed

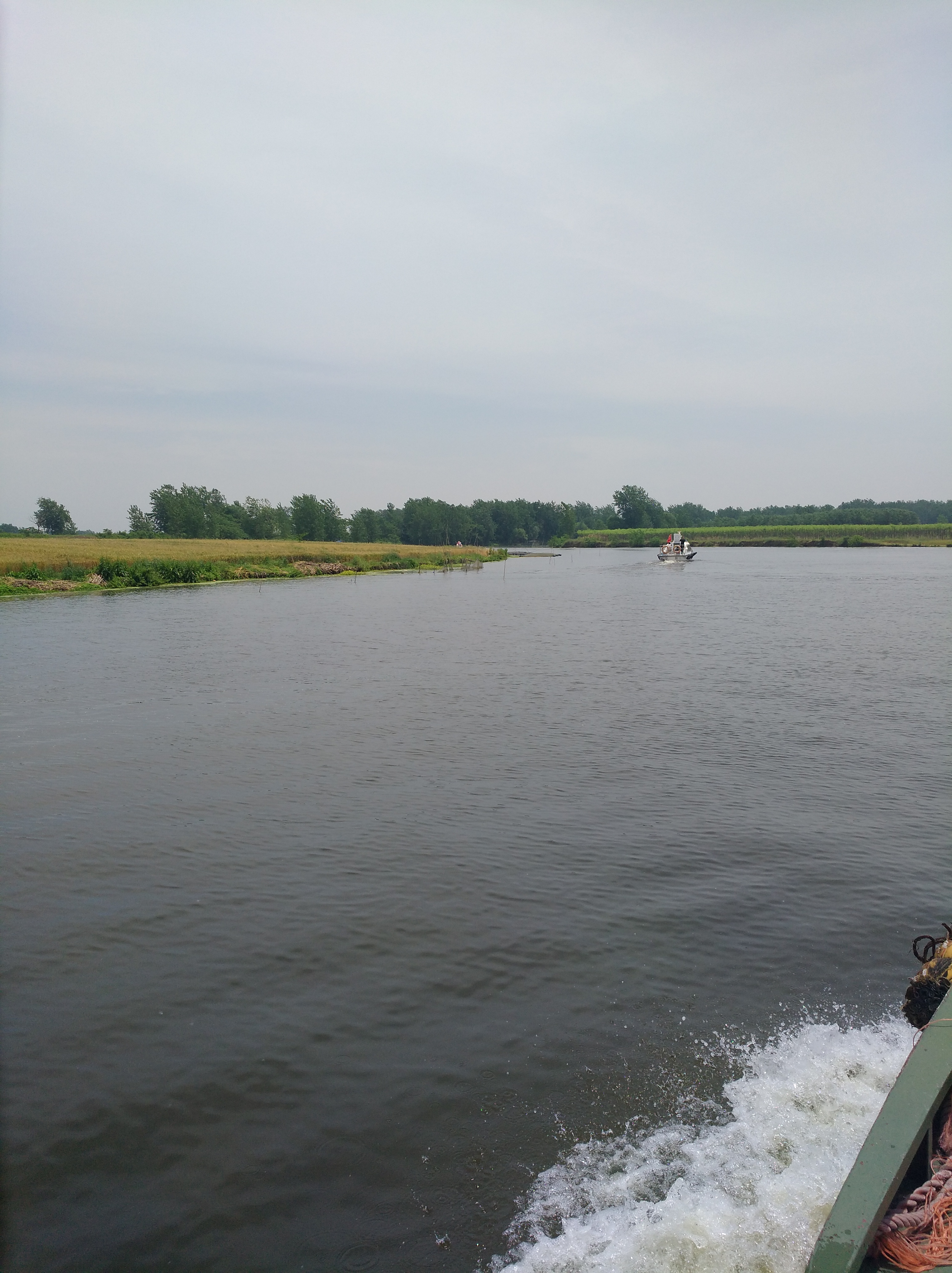
Quan River photoed at 11:53 a.m on May 18th,2017

The Quan River is a major river in Henan province of China. It is the largest tributary of the Ying River which is a part of the Huai River watershed system. Its total length is about 241 km, 120 km of which in the upstream section is also called Fen River. It flows into the Ying River in Anhui province.
