= Huai River Water Resources Commission =

Chinese government agency

Coordinates: 32°54′59″N 117°23′32″E

Huai River Water Resources Commission (HRWC) is a subordinated government agency of Ministry of Water Resources of the People's Republic of China. HRWC takes responsibility of water administration of the Huai River basin which covers some parts of Henan, Anhui, Jiangsu, Shandong and Hubei provinces. The head office is in Bengbu City.
