= Qian Zhengying =

Chinese politician (1923–2022)

- 钱正英

President of the Red Cross Society of China
- In office April 1994 – October 1999
- Preceded by: Chen Minzhang
- Succeeded by: Peng Peiyun

Vice Chairwoman of the Chinese People's Political Consultative Conference
- In office 27 March 1993 – 13 March 2003
- Chairperson: Li Xiannian; Li Ruihuan

Minister of Water Resources and Electric Power
- In office 8 March 1982 – March 1988
- Premier: Zhao Ziyang; Li Peng
- Preceded by: Herself (as Minister of Water Resources)
- Succeeded by: Yang Zhenhuai
- In office April 1974 – 23 February 1979
- Premier: Zhou Enlai; Hua Guofeng
- Preceded by: Zhang Wenbi
- Succeeded by: Herself (as Minister of Water Resources)

Minister of Water Resources
- In office 23 February 1979 – 8 March 1982
- Premier: Hua Guofeng; Zhao Ziyang
- Preceded by: Herself (as Minister of Water Resources and Electric Power)
- Succeeded by: Herself (as Minister of Water Resources and Electric Power)

Personal details
- Born: 4 July 1923 Shanghai, China
- Died: 22 October 2022 (aged 99) Beijing, China
- Party: Chinese Communist Party
- Spouse: Huang Xinbai
- Education: Utopia University
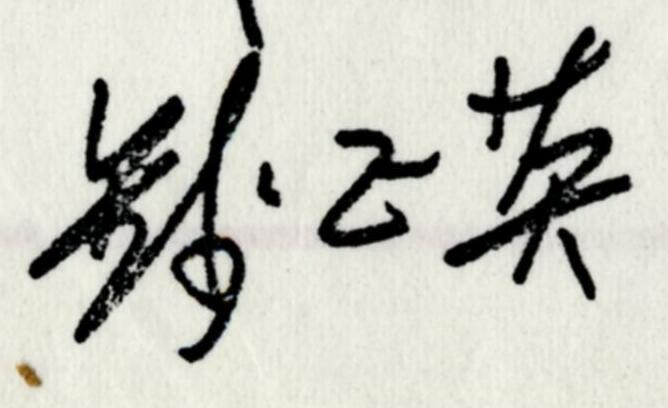
- Signature

Chinese name
- Simplified Chinese: 钱正英
- Traditional Chinese: 錢正英
Transcriptions
Standard Mandarin
- Hanyu Pinyin: Qián Zhèngyīng

Qian Zhengying (Chinese: 钱正英; 4 July 1923 – 22 October 2022) was a Chinese hydrologist and politician.

== Biography ==
She was born in Jiaxing, Zhejiang Province. Her father trained as an engineer in the United States before returning to China; some sources report that Qian was born in the United States. She trained as a civil engineer at Utopia University. Qian joined the Chinese Communist Party in 1941. She worked with the Red Army in northern China and was involved in projects on the Huai and Yellow Rivers. In 1949, she was vice-director of the Water Conservancy Department of the East China Political and Military Commission and vice-director of the Project Department for the Huaihe River Commission. From 1950 to 1952, she was president of East China Technical University of Water Resources (now Hohai University).

She was a member of the 10th, 11th, 12th, 13th and 14th Central Committee of the Chinese Communist Party. Qian was also vice-minister and then Minister of Water Resources. She served as Vice Chairperson of the Chinese People's Political Consultative Conference for the 7th, 8th and 9th national committees. In 1994, she was elected the sixth president of the Red Cross Society of China. In 1997, she was elected academician of the Chinese Academy of Engineering and, in 1998, received the Technology Engineering of China prize.

Government offices
Preceded by Zhang Wenbi	Minister of Water Resources; 1974–1988	Succeeded by Yang Zhenhuai
Civic offices
Preceded by Chen Minzhang	President of the Red Cross Society of China; 1994–1999	Succeeded by Peng Peiyun
Assembly seats
New title	Chairperson of the Medical, Health and Sports Committee of the Chinese People's Political Consultative Conference; 1988–1995	Succeeded by Qian Weichang
