= Zhangxin, Anhui =

Zhangxin 张新镇
- Town
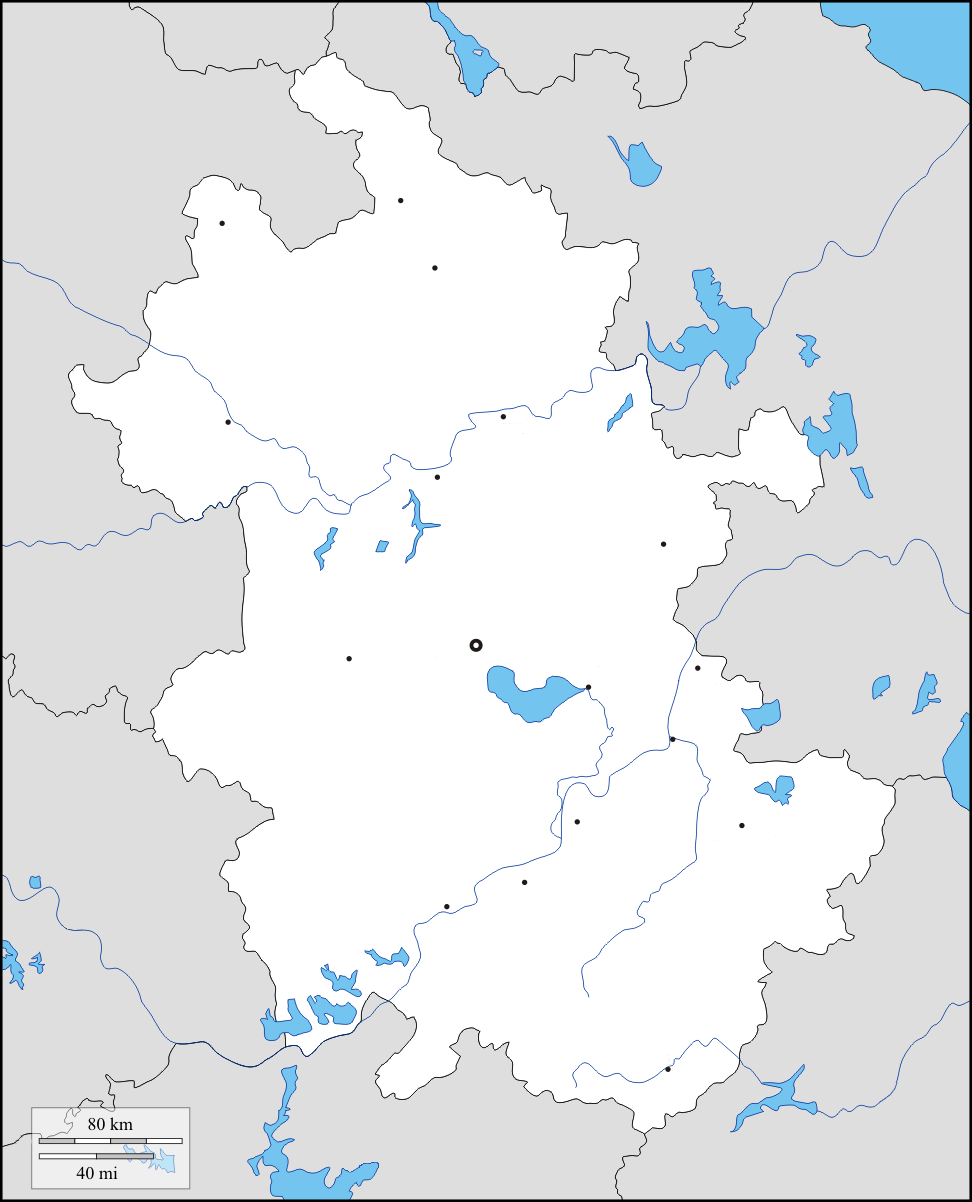
- Location in Anhui Zhangxin (China)
- Coordinates: 32°45′55″N 115°16′15″E
- Country: China
- Province: Anhui
- Prefecture-level city: Fuyang
- District: Yanqing District
- Time zone: UTC+8 (China Standard)

Zhangxin is a town in Linquan County of Fuyang, Anhui, China.
