= Linquan County =

Linquan 临泉县
- County
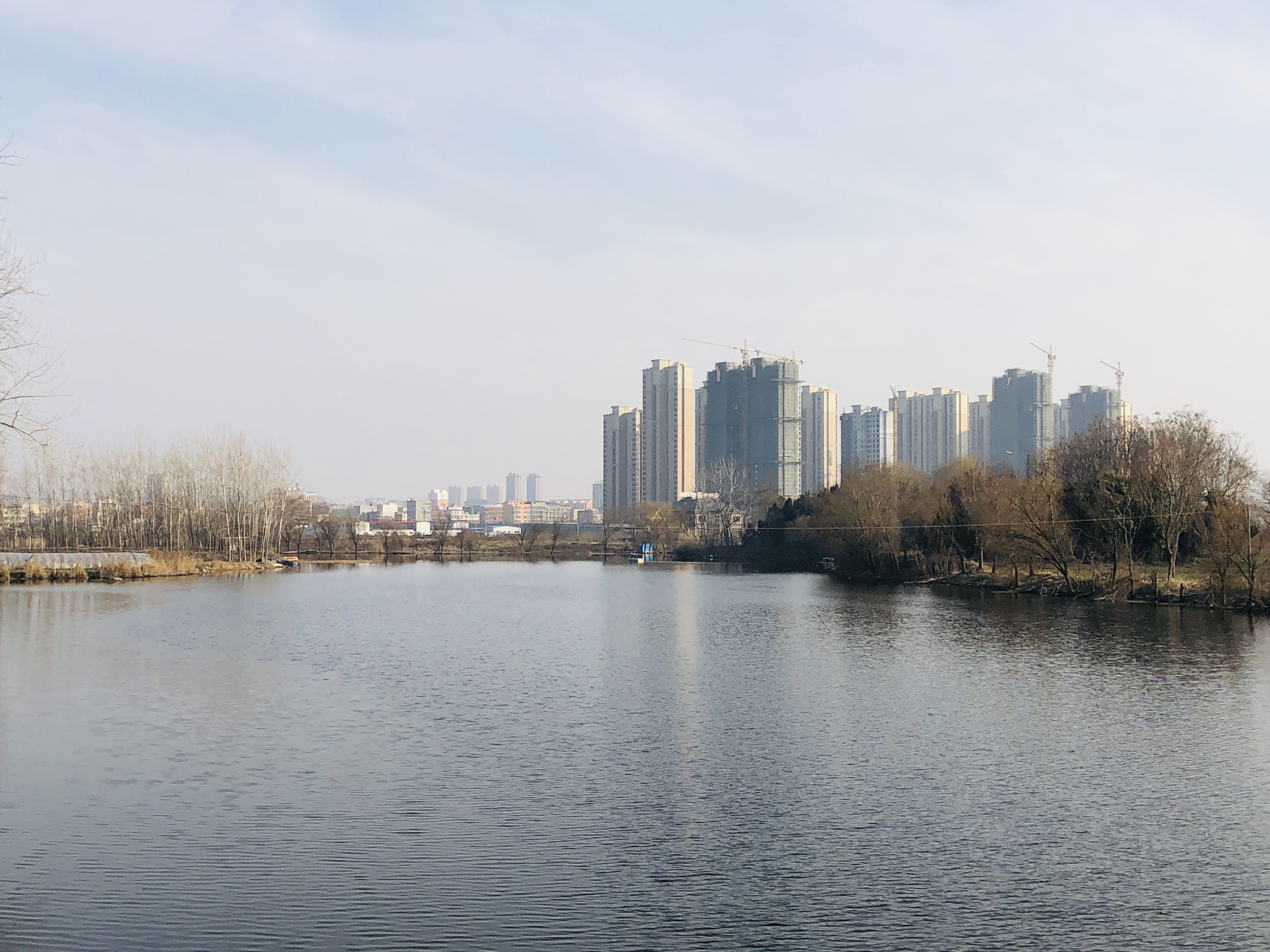

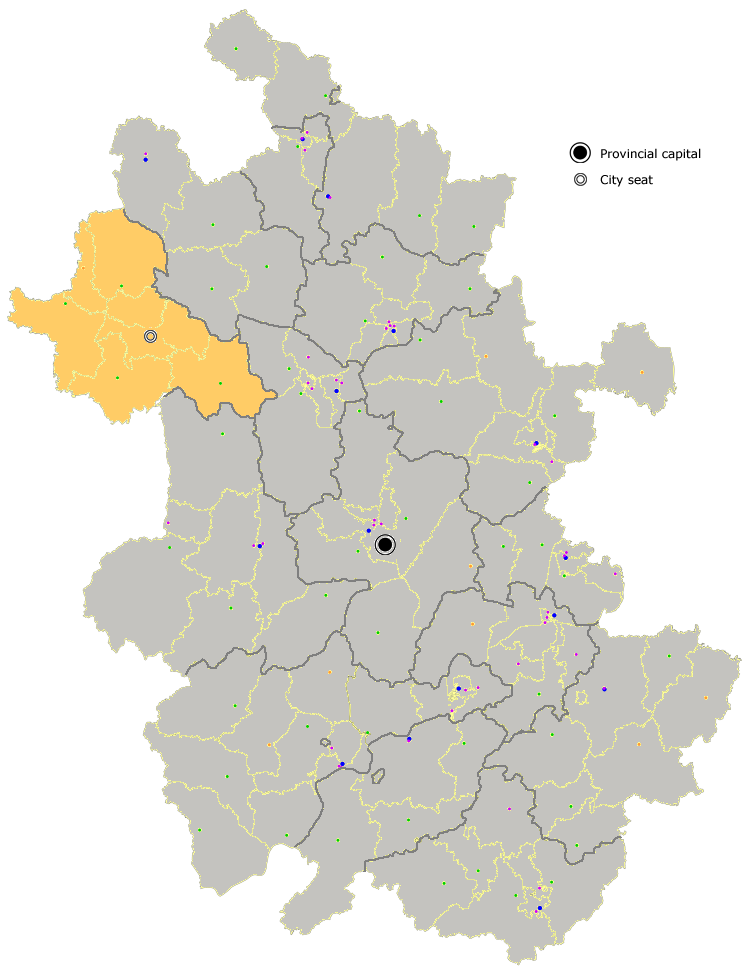
- Location of Linquan County in Anhui (Fuyang in yellow)
- Coordinates: 32°56′N 115°18′E
- Country: China
- Province: Anhui
- Prefecture-level city: Fuyang
- Seat: Chengguan (城关镇)

Area
  - Total: 1,839 km^{2} (710 sq mi)

Population (2019)
  - Total: 2,307,000
  - Density: 1,254/km^{2} (3,249/sq mi)
- Time zone: UTC+8 (China Standard)
- Postal code: 236400

Linquan County (simplified Chinese: 临泉县; traditional Chinese: 臨泉縣; pinyin: Línquán Xiàn; lit. 'near spring') is a county in the northwest of Anhui Province, China, bordering Henan province to the northwest, west, and southwest. It is the westernmost county-level division of Fuyang city. The Quan River 泉河 a tributary of the Ying River flows from its source in Henan province, through the county seat in Chengguan (城关镇; 城關鎮; Chéngguān Zhèn) and then along the county's northern border with Jieshou. According to the 2010 census, the population was 1,543,218, the area is 702 sq mi (1,820 km^{2}). Linquan is the most populous rural county in China.

== History ==
Linquan, called Shendi (沈地) in ancient times, has a history of three thousand years. The capital of Shen State (Early Zhou dynasty–c.500 BCE) was located in Linquan. The region was part of Pingyu County established in the 26th year of Qin Shihuang (221 BCE). Later it formed part of the fief held by the Marquis of Fuyang (富陽侯) established in the first year of Yongjian in the Eastern Han dynasty (126 CE).

=== Imperial history ===
After the Sui dynasty unified China, Emperor Kaihuang established Shen Prefecture (瀋州; Shěn Zhōu) in third year of his reign (583 CE). Baoxin County was abolished and divided into Xiyang County and Shenqiu County. In the first year of Tang Wude (618), Gaotang County was established in the southeast of this county. It was abandoned after six years and became part of Ruyin County. Meanwhile, the two counties of Xiyang and Shenqiu were abandoned and transferred to Ruyin County in the first year of Zhenguan (627). In the second year of Shenlong (706) the region was divided into Ruyin and Shenqiu Counties being administered by Yingzhou. During the Northern Song era (北宋; 4 February 960 – 20 March 1127) the area was under the jurisdiction of Shunchang prefecture (顺昌府) of Jingxibei Road. As per History of the Song Shunchang was captured by Jin during the Jin–Song Wars in 1140. At the beginning of the Ming dynasty (from 1368), Shenqiu County status was abandoned and relegated to become Shenqiu Town (沈丘镇), under administration of Yingzhou and belonged to Fengyang Mansion (凤阳府).

In 1667 Anhui Province was established by the Qing dynasty and Shenqiu Town was under the jurisdiction of Yingzhou, Anhui Province. In the 13th year of Yongzheng (1735), Yingzhou was promoted to a prefecture and the land was established as Fuyang Xixiang (阜阳西乡) in Fuyang County. The government was established at Yikou Bridge 驿口桥 (now Laoji 老集), while at Shenqiuji (沈丘集) an inspection department (设巡检司) was set up.

=== Contemporary history ===
In September of the 23rd year of the Republic of China (1934), Fuyang Xixiang covered an area from Yinghe River in the north to Honghe River in the south, along Chapeng Road (茶棚大路), Longwangtang (龙王堂) Litodian (栗头店), Wukengji (五坑集), Oumiaoji (欧庙集), Huilongji (会龙集), and Jiulong (九龙沟). In January in the 24th year of the Republic of China (1935) a new county was formally established to the west of the ditch. Because the county seat was near the Quan River, it was named Linquan County, comprising three districts. It belonged to the seventh administrative inspection district of Anhui Province.

At the beginning of Liberation, from 36 to 38 years (1947-1949) of the Republic of China, Linquan county was again divided into three counties (Quannan 泉南, Quanyang 泉阳 and Linquan City 临泉市) under the jurisdiction of the Fourth Prefectural Committee of Henan, Anhui and Jiangsu Districts. In March 1949 those counties were abolished and the old Linquan county boundaries were restored henceforth under jurisdiction of Fuyang Prefecture firstly as part of the People's Administrative Office of Northern Anhui (Wanbei), and after Wanbei was abolished in 1952, to Anhui Province. In 1994 Fuyang was elevated to a Prefecture-level city of Anhui province.

== Administrative divisions ==
Linquan currently (2019) consists of 5 subdistricts (Chinese: 街道; pinyin: jiēdào), 24 townships, 2 townships, 1 provincial economic development zone, 1 provincial north–south industrial park. There are 395 villages (communities), distributed over these divisions.

Linquan introduced subdistricts in 2014/5, whereby Chengguan Town (Chinese: 城关镇; pinyin: Chéngguān Zhèn) Niuzhuang Township (牛庄乡) and Tianqiao Township (田桥乡) became Chengguan Subdistrict (城关街道), Xingtang Subdistrict (邢塘街道) and Tianqiao Subdistrict (田桥街道). The county government is seated at Chengguan Subdistrict.

Administrative Level	Name List
5 Subdistricts (Jiedao : 街道)	Chengguan (城关街道), Xingtang (邢塘街道),
	Tianqiao (城东街道), Chengdong (城南街道),
	Chengnan (城南街道)
24 Towns (Zhen : 镇)	Yangqiao (杨桥镇), Tanpeng (谭棚镇),
	Laoji (老集镇), Huaji (滑集镇),
	Luzhai (吕寨镇), Shanqiao (单桥镇),
	Zhangguan (长官镇), Songji (宋集镇),
	Luzhai (吕寨镇), Shanqiao (单桥镇),
	Zhangguan (长官镇), Songji (宋集镇),
	Zhangxin (张新镇), Aiting (艾亭镇),
	Chenji (陈集镇), Weizhai (韦寨镇),
	Yingxian (迎仙镇), Gaotang (高塘镇),
	Wadian (瓦店镇), Jiangzhai (姜寨镇),
	Miaocha (庙岔镇), Huangling (黄岭镇),
	Baimiao (白庙镇), Guanmiao (关庙镇),
2 Townships (Xiang : 乡)	Tupo (土陂乡), Taolao (陶老乡)

The below townships ceased to exist as independent units in 2015:
Fanxingji Township (范兴集乡), Xieji Township (谢集乡), Yangxiaojie Township (杨小街镇), Taolao Township (陶老乡).

The below townships ceased to exist as independent units in 2016:
Zhangying Township (张营乡), Pangying Township (庞营乡)

== Geography and climate ==
Linquan, is located in the Huang-Huai plains at the southwestern tip of northwestern Anhui province. The geographical location is between 114°50'～115°31' east longitude and 32°35'～33°09' north latitude. The county is at its broadest 62 km (39 mi) in the northern part, while 68 km (42 mi) at its longest (north–south). The total area covers 1,839 square kilometers. The county borders 3 other counties in Fuyang prefecture (clockwise - Jieshou City, Yingzhou District, Funan County), and 6 counties in Henan province in the west and south (anti-clockwise - Shenqiu County, Xiangcheng City, Pingyu County, Xincai County, Huaibin County, and Gushi County). In all a total of 9 counties.

Linquan County has a continental warm temperate semi-humid monsoon climate zone, with warm and humid climate, moderate precipitation, sufficient sunshine and four distinct seasons. Spring is warm and rainy; summer is hot and rain is abundant; autumn is cool and the weather is clear; winter is cold and there is little snow.

Climate data for Linquan, elevation 36 m (118 ft), (1991–2020 normals, extremes 1981–present)
Month	Jan	Feb	Mar	Apr	May	Jun	Jul	Aug	Sep	Oct	Nov	Dec	Year
Record high °C (°F)	19.7 (67.5)	27.1 (80.8)	34.0 (93.2)	33.2 (91.8)	37.4 (99.3)	39.8 (103.6)	40.6 (105.1)	38.8 (101.8)	38.6 (101.5)	34.6 (94.3)	28.2 (82.8)	21.6 (70.9)	40.6 (105.1)
Mean daily maximum °C (°F)	6.7 (44.1)	10.2 (50.4)	15.4 (59.7)	21.9 (71.4)	27.2 (81.0)	31.3 (88.3)	32.4 (90.3)	31.3 (88.3)	27.7 (81.9)	22.7 (72.9)	15.5 (59.9)	9.0 (48.2)	20.9 (69.7)
Daily mean °C (°F)	1.9 (35.4)	5.0 (41.0)	9.9 (49.8)	16.1 (61.0)	21.5 (70.7)	25.9 (78.6)	27.9 (82.2)	26.8 (80.2)	22.5 (72.5)	16.9 (62.4)	10.1 (50.2)	4.0 (39.2)	15.7 (60.3)
Mean daily minimum °C (°F)	−1.6 (29.1)	1.0 (33.8)	5.5 (41.9)	11.0 (51.8)	16.4 (61.5)	21.3 (70.3)	24.2 (75.6)	23.4 (74.1)	18.6 (65.5)	12.6 (54.7)	6.1 (43.0)	0.4 (32.7)	11.6 (52.8)
Record low °C (°F)	−13.6 (7.5)	−14.5 (5.9)	−5.7 (21.7)	−0.9 (30.4)	5.6 (42.1)	12.8 (55.0)	17.8 (64.0)	14.6 (58.3)	8.0 (46.4)	0.5 (32.9)	−7.9 (17.8)	−17.0 (1.4)	−17.0 (1.4)
Average precipitation mm (inches)	23.3 (0.92)	27.7 (1.09)	46.7 (1.84)	57.0 (2.24)	78.5 (3.09)	151.1 (5.95)	200.7 (7.90)	139.6 (5.50)	77.7 (3.06)	55.2 (2.17)	41.0 (1.61)	19.9 (0.78)	918.4 (36.15)
Average precipitation days (≥ 0.1 mm)	5.7	6.7	7.6	7.3	9.4	8.8	11.6	10.6	8.5	7.3	7.0	5.0	95.5
Average snowy days	4.0	2.7	1.1	0	0	0	0	0	0	0	0.7	1.7	10.2
Average relative humidity (%)	70	70	69	70	71	71	80	82	77	70	70	69	72
Mean monthly sunshine hours	116.0	119.2	154.2	183.6	193.7	180.7	186.7	174.7	153.9	154.5	143.4	131.7	1,892.3
Percentage possible sunshine	37	38	41	47	45	42	43	43	42	44	46	43	43
Source: China Meteorological Administration

== Economy ==
It is a member of the National Poor County List. Counties on this list can receive special finance support (It doesn't have to give tax to the central government). Unemployment is a problem in this county, many people have to work away from home, often children are left at home. The typical legal wage of a teacher in public schools is no more than 4000 yuan a month, while doctors or nurses at the only hospital with decent facilities can get a total amount of 20000 yuan a month.

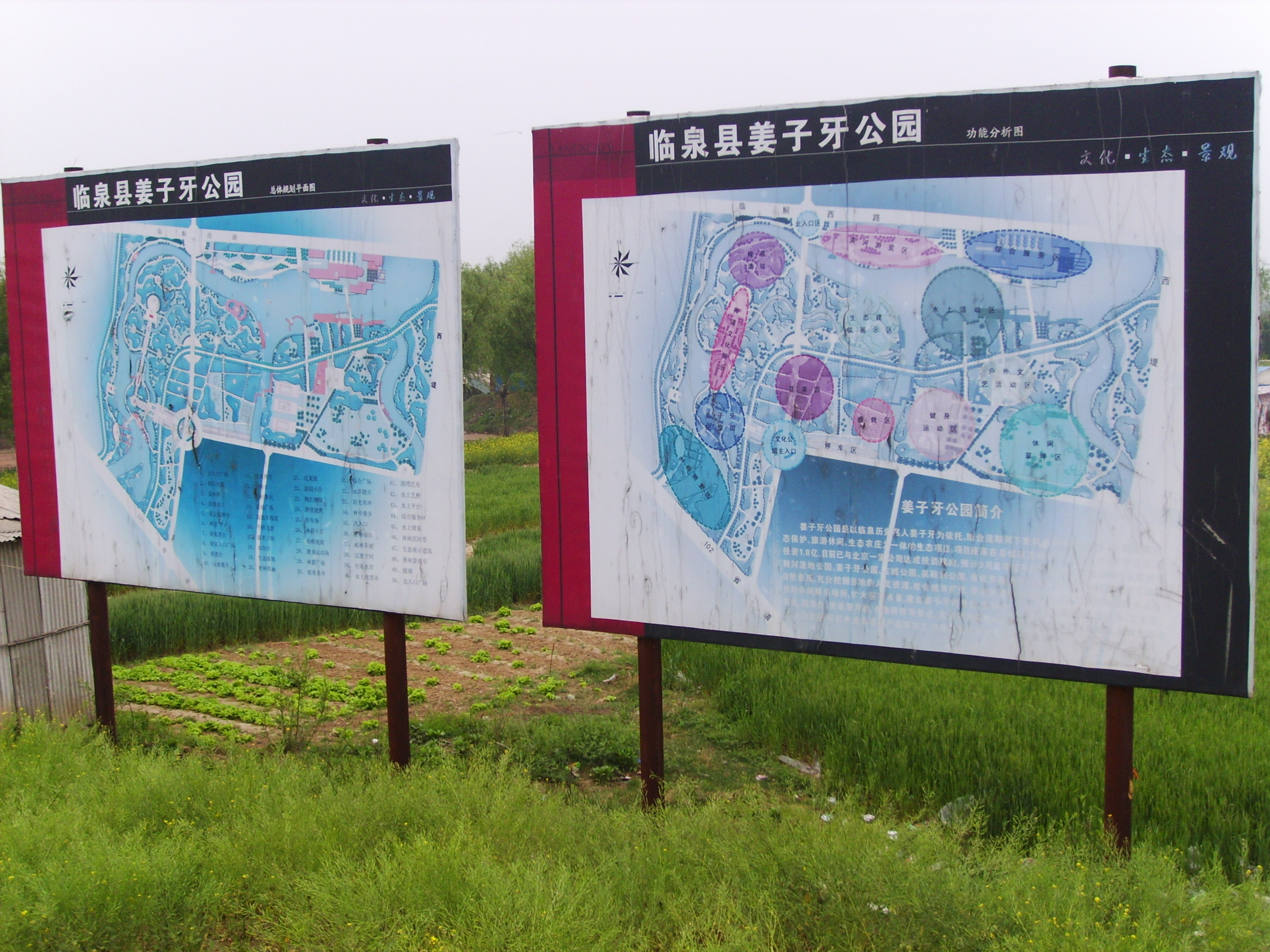
More tourist place in the building process

Though very poor, apartment prices in the downtown area is 6000 yuan/m^{2} as of 2018, many about 30-story tall buildings appeared in the past several years, all of which are apartments.

It also tried to build more tourist visiting place since there are no other economic activities here. In 2019, Linquan County achieved a regional GDP of 36.97 billion yuan, a year-on-year increase of 8.3% at comparable prices. In April 2020, Linquan County withdrew from the poverty-stricken counties.

== Transportation ==
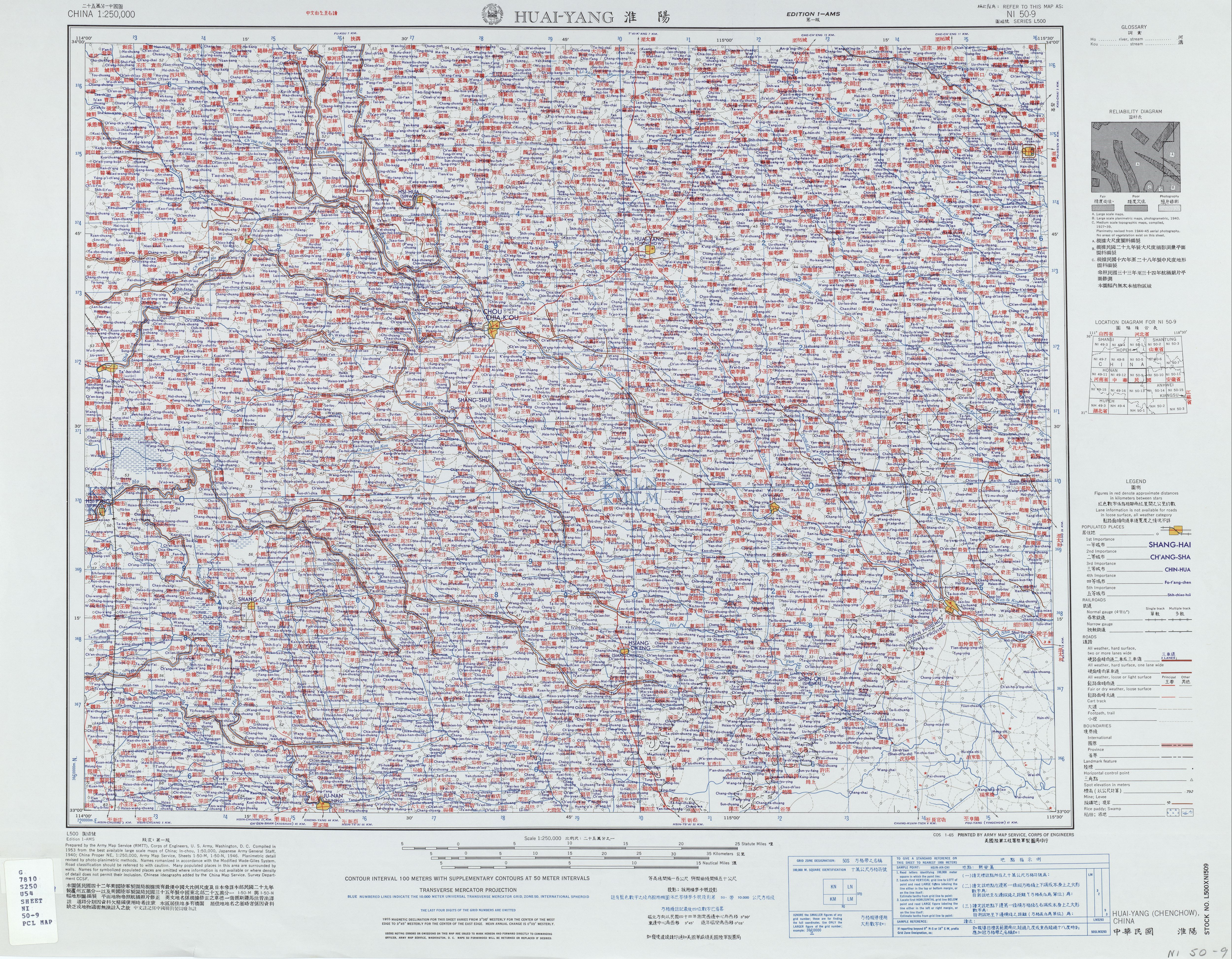
Map including Linquan (labeled as Lin-ch'uan (Shen-ch'iu-chi) bottom right corner 襄城) (AMS, 1953)

Historically the main transportation was by water as the Quan river is part of the Huai river system, which linked the area to Fuyang directly. Otherwise cart tracks connected Linquan eastwards to Yangqiaozhen (杨桥镇) and Fuyang, via Baizhuang (白庄), south eastward to Zhangguanzhen (长官镇) Linquan County, and northwards to Jieshou. There was also a cart track running westwards to Shenqiu old town (Laochengzhen 老城镇) crossing the Henan border at Wugoucun 武沟村.

=== Aviation ===
The closest commercial airport is at Fuyang which is 57 km (35 mi) (1 hour) car journey from Chengguan the county seat.

=== Highway system ===
As of the end of 2018, the county's highway mileage was 3,036 kilometres. Linquan County has Fulin, Linxie, Linxin, Linai, Linnan and Critical highways. Fuxin high-speed highway, paved road east from Fuyang forty Interchange, joining Huai Fu highway Fuyang South Interchange, across the board after Yingzhou District, Fuyang City, Funan County, the territory of Linquan County, west of Linquan Liao Zhuang, connected to Henan Xincai-Huazhuang Expressway, is the continuation of Hehuaifu Expressway towards Henan Province. The length of the territory is 25.52 kilometers, passing through six towns and towns including Tubei, Laoji, Fanxingji, Yangxiaojie, Songji Town, and Chenji Town in Linquan County. In this section, there is an import and export (Linquan South) and a service area (Liaozhuang). ), ending the history of no expressway in Linquan County.

=== Rail ===
The first railway station in Linquan opened in December 2019. Linquan railway station is an intermediate station on the Zhengzhou–Fuyang high-speed railway. It is located in the east of the county and west of Yangqiao Town, about 10 kilometers away from the urban area of Linquan County.

In the first half of 2016, the preliminary design plan for the Zhengzhou-Fuyang high-speed rail was officially approved by the China Railway Corporation and the provincial governments of Henan and Anhui. The Fuyang section of the Zheng-Fu high-speed railway is 64 kilometers in length, passing through three counties and municipalities in Jieshou, Linquan, and Yingzhou. It has three stations in Jieshou South, Linquan, and Fuyang West, among which two stations are Jieshou South and Linquan.

== Education ==
Most schools are public, private ones are more expensive.All three senior high schools located in the downtown area, whose size is only 16 km^{2} (6.2 sq mi).

== Demographics ==
As of the end of 2019, the registered population of Linquan County was 2.307 million, an increase of 11,000 over the end of the previous year. Among the registered population, the male population is 1.194 million and the female population is 1.112 million; the urban population is 394,000 and the rural population is 1.913 million. The urbanization rate of the registered population was 17.1%, an increase of 5.9% over the previous year. According to the feedback from a sample survey by the Municipal Bureau of Statistics, at the end of 2019, the permanent population of Linquan County was 1.659 million, an increase of 9 million over the end of the previous year. The main ethnic group in Linquan County is the Han, and the ethnic minorities mainly include the Hui, Manchu, Miao, Zhuang, Yi, Dai, Mongolian, and Daur.

== Culture ==
Linquan acrobatics has long history in the region, and in recent years, it has developed a lot and folk acrobatic art groups have which have toured all over the country.

== Tourism ==
Places to visit:

=== Ginkgo tree ===
At the ancient city of the county, the ginkgo tree is about 1,000 years old, more than 20 meters high, more than 30 meters in circumference.

=== Old street's Linquan ===
"LaoJie" was formerly known as Shenqiu Street, which is located in the northwest of Chengguan Street Office. It runs along Shunhe Street as its axis. The historic street is about 3 meters wide. Walking on the smooth slab road, walking on the footsteps of the ancients, watching the old shops on both sides, the faded signboards and wooden doors are also telling the past bustling scene.

=== Liu Family's home garden ===
The number of lotus pots is 160,000. World Records of lotus have been applied to get approve. There are all over flowers in the summer time in this town.

=== Acrobatic Village ===
Linquan Wei Xiaozhuang; started from 1, 2 acrobatic troupes in the 1950s, and after development, now has 800 circuses, covering 31 towns throughout the county. It Was named "Hometown of Acrobatics".
