= Backyard furnace =

Chinese blast furnaces

- Traditional Chinese: 土法煉鋼
- Simplified Chinese: 土法炼钢
- Literal meaning: primitive steelmaking
Transcriptions
Standard Mandarin
- Hanyu Pinyin: tǔfǎ liàngāng

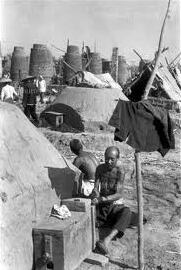
Workers tend backyard furnaces (1958)

In China, backyard furnaces (土法炼钢) were large and small blast furnaces used by the people of China during the Great Leap Forward (1958–1962). These were constructed in the fields and backyards of communes to further the Great Leap Forward's aims of making China the top steel producer in the world. However, most furnaces were capable of producing only unusable pig iron.

The productivity of backyard furnaces was highly variable across China. Many regions experienced a renewed interest in traditional metalworking practices, and successfully produced steel and copper. Nonetheless, backyard furnaces were largely an improvised and undisciplined pursuit in much of the countryside. In 1958, the Communist Party funded the production of dozens of documentaries on metalworking in an attempt to counteract widespread ignorance and further promote the practice.

Peasants were encouraged to prioritize iron and steel production over agricultural obligations, which contributed to the Great Chinese Famine. Where iron ore was unavailable, various steel and iron items were smelted for the intended result of manufacturing steel for more useful creations. The widespread popularity of the practice led to the mass destruction of Shengbao iron cash coins from the Taiping Heavenly Kingdom.

Mao Zedong defended backyard furnaces despite the shortcomings, claiming that the practice showed mass enthusiasm, mass creativity, and mass participation in economic development.

== See also ==
- Economy of China
- Heavy metals
- Pollution in China
