= Ministry of Water Resources (China) =

Government agency

Ministry of Water Resources of the People's Republic of China
- 中华人民共和国水利部; Zhōnghuá Rénmín Gònghéguó Shuǐlìbù
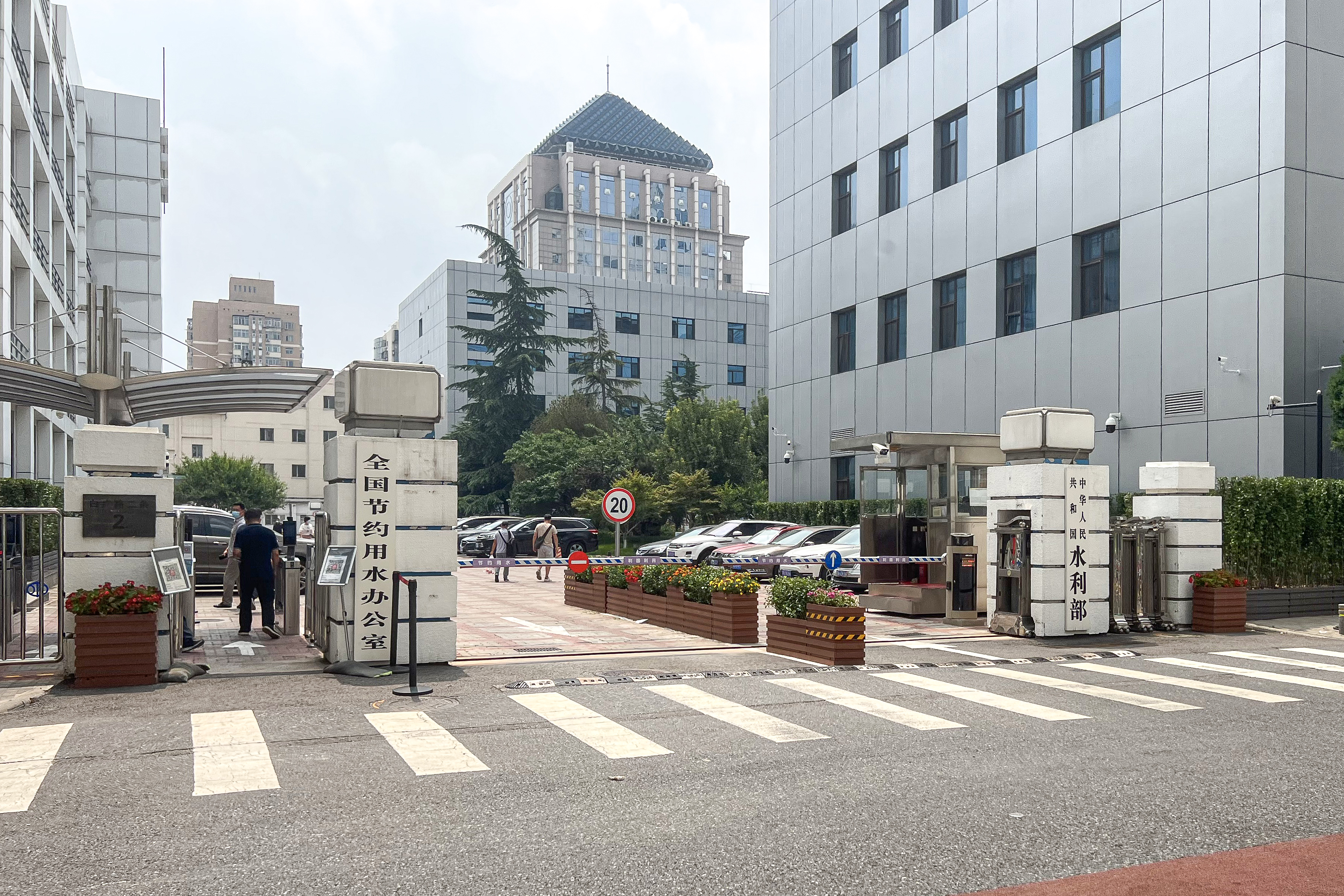

Agency overview
- Formed: September 1954; 71 years ago
- Type: Constituent Department of the State Council (cabinet-level executive department)
- Jurisdiction: Government of China
- Headquarters: Beijing
- Minister responsible: Li Guoying, Minister of Water Resources
- Deputy Ministers responsible: Tian Xuebin; Wang Daoxi; Liu Weiping; Zhu Chengqing; Chen Min
- Agency executive: Wang Xinzhe, Leader of Discipline Inspection & Supervision Team
- Parent agency: State Council
- Website: www.mwr.gov.cn

The Ministry of Water Resources of the People's Republic of China is an executive department of the State Council of the People's Republic of China responsible for managing water resources in China. It is the 18th-ranking department of the State Council.

== History ==
In 2018, some of the Ministry of Water Resources environmental policy functions were transferred to the newly created Ministry of Ecology and Environment (MEE) as part of the deepening the reform of the Party and state institutions, including responsibility over water function zoning and watershed protection. The Ministry of Water Resources also absorbed the Three Gorges Project Construction Committee and the South-North Water Diversion Project Construction Committee.

== Functions ==
The Ministry's duties include issuing water permits and fees, irrigation and drainage, conservation of water and soil, water technology, hydrology, flood control, drought relief, and international water issues and cooperation. It also directs the river basin authorities for six major river systems.

There are several authorities responsible for water management in China. Water pollution is the responsibility of the environmental authorities, but the water itself is managed by the Ministry of Water Resources. Sewage is administered by the Ministry of Housing and Urban-Rural Development, but groundwater falls within the realm of the Ministry of Land and Resources.

== Leaders ==
The Ministry of Water Resources is directed by the Minister of Water Resources.

Position	Name of Person
Minister	Chen Lei
Vice Minister	E Jingping
Vice Minister	Jiao Yong
The Leader of Discipline Inspection Team	Tian Xuebin
Vice Minister	Liu Ning
Vice Minister	Tian Ye
Vice Minister	Zhou Xuewen

== Organization ==
=== Administration ===
The Ministry of Water Resources consists of following departments and offices:

Department		Area of Responsibilities
1	General Office	Coordinating activities among different departments
2	Department of Planning and Programming	Developing national water resources development plans
3	Department of Policy, Law and Regulations	Formulating water policies and relevant rules and regulations
4	Department of Water Resources Management	Managing the water-drawing permit system and water resources fee system;
5	Department of Finance and Economics	Formulating economic regulatory measures for the water industry
6	Department of Personnel, Labor and Education	Managing personnel, establishment of institutions and their staffing, labor and wage management
7	Department of International Cooperation, Science and Technology	Managing water issues foreign affairs between the Chinese Government and foreign governments, and for the development of science and technology for the water industry
8	Department of Construction and Management	Formulating rules and regulations and technical standards for the management and protection of water areas,
9	Department of Water and Soil Conservation	Water and soil conservation and coordinate the overall control of water and soil loss
10	Department of Irrigation, Drainage and Rural Water Supply	Formulating policies and programs with respect to rural water resources and develop relevant specifications and standards
11	The Office of State Flood Control and Drought Relief headquarters	Organizing nationwide activities of flood control and drought relief, undertake the day-to-day work

=== Other agencies ===
- River Basin Commissions:
  - Changjiang Water Resources Commission, located in Wuhan
  - Yellow River Conservancy Commission, located in Zhengzhou
  - Huai River Water Resources Commission, located in Bengbu
  - Hai River Water Resources Commission, located in Tianjin
  - Pearl River Water Resources Commission, located in Guangzhou
  - Songliao River Water Resources Commission, located in Changchun
  - Taihu Basin Authority, located in Shanghai

== See also ==
- Water resources of China
- Water supply and sanitation in China
