= Huating Lake =

Huating Lake Dam
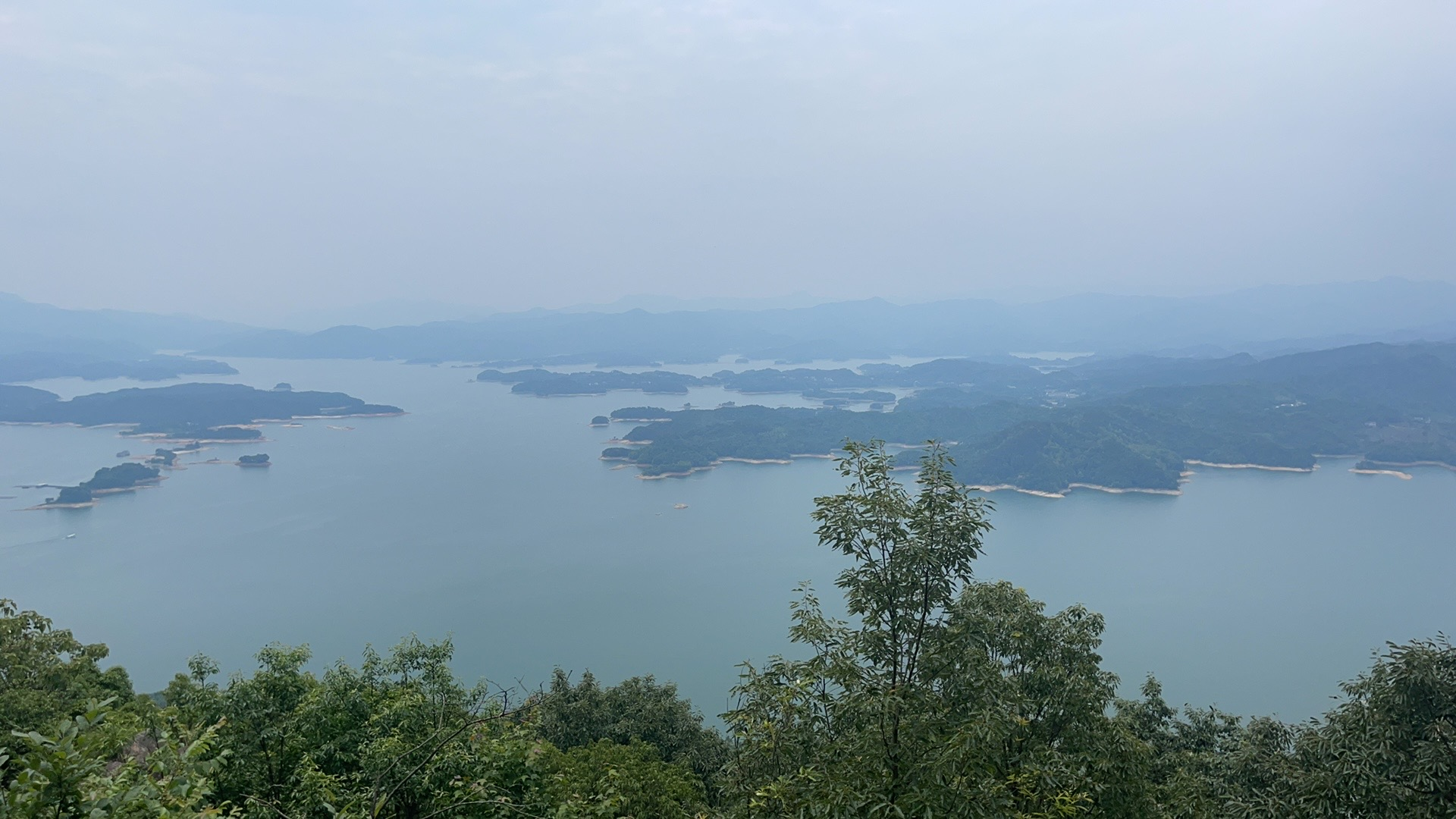
- Huating Lake in 2024

- Location within China
- Interactive map of Huating Lake Dam
- Country: People's Republic of China
- Location: Chalukou Village (岔路口乡); Reservoir in Taihu County, Anqing City, Anhui Province
- Coordinates: 30°28′02″N 116°14′51″E
- Construction began: 1958
- Opening date: 1976

Dam and spillways
- Type of dam: Crushed rock and clay embankment
- Class: Large
- Code: BFAA5102941
- Impounds: Changhe (长河)
- Height: 57.9 m (190 ft)
- Length: 566 m (1,857 ft)
- Elevation at crest: 99.4 m (326 ft)
- Width (crest): 6.7 m (22 ft)

Reservoir
- Creates: Huating Lake 花亭湖
- Total capacity: 2.39 billion cubic metres (84 billion cubic feet)
- Catchment area: 1,880 km^{2} (730 sq mi)
- Website hth.gov.cn

Huating Lake (Chinese: 花亭湖; pinyin: Huātíng Hú), also known as the Hualiangting Reservoir (花凉亭水库 Huāliángtíng Shuĭkù), is a large scale reservoir in Taihu County, Anqing City, Anhui Province, China. The reservoir is used for the purposes of flood control, hydro-electric power generation, agricultural irrigation, transport and tourism. The lake is a National Scenic Area, National 4A Tourist Attraction and demonstration site for agro-tourism.

Damming of the lake to create a reservoir began in 1958 and continued until 1962. There was then an eight-year hiatus until 1970 when construction resumed. Fundamental infrastructure was in place by 1976 and the project completed in 2001.

On October 26, 2009, a 2.1 billion RMB, 23 month reinforcement program began at the reservoir.

The reservoir provides irrigation for Susong County, Wangjiang County, Huaining County and the eastern part of Taihu County, a total area of some 1.05 million Chinese acres.

== See also ==
- List of lakes of China
