= G4231 Nanjing–Jiujiang Expressway =

Road in China

Nanjing–Jiujiang Expressway
- 南京－九江高速公路
- Ningjiu Expressway 宁九高速公路

Route information
- Auxiliary route of G42

Major junctions
- North end: G2503 / G347 in Pukou District, Nanjing, Jiangsu
- South end: Jiujiang, Jiangxi

Location
- Country: China

Highway system
- National Trunk Highway System; Primary; Auxiliary; National Highways; Transport in China
← G4223	→ G45

The G4231 Nanjing–Jiujiang Expressway (Chinese: 南京—九江高速公路), also referred to as the Ningjiu Expressway (Chinese: 宁九高速公路), is an under construction expressway in China that connects the cities of Nanjing, Jiangsu to Jiujiang, Jiangxi.

== Route ==
The expressway starts in Pukou District, Nanjing and passes through He County, Jiujiang District, Hanshan County, Jiujiang District, Wuwei, Jiaoqu District, Zongyang County, Yixiu District, Huaining County, Daguan District, Wangjiang County, Susong County and ends in Jiujiang. The route travels through the provinces of Anhui, Jiangsu and Jiangxi.
