= G4222 He County–Xiangyang Expressway =

Road in China

He County–Xiangyang Expressway
- 和县－襄阳高速公路
- Hexiang Expressway 和襄高速公路

Route information
- Auxiliary route of G42

Major junctions
- West end: Zaoyang, Xiangyang, Hubei
- East end: G4231 / Anhui S22 in He County, Ma'anshan, Anhui

Location
- Country: China

Highway system
- National Trunk Highway System; Primary; Auxiliary; National Highways; Transport in China
← G4221	→ G4223

The G4222 He County–Xiangyang Expressway (Chinese: 和县—襄阳高速公路), also referred to as the Hexiang Expressway (Chinese: 和襄高速公路), is an expressway in China that connects He County, Anhui to Xiangyang, Hubei.

== Route ==
=== Anhui ===
The Ninghe Expressway has a design speed on 120 km/h (75 mph) with a total length of 41.2 km (25.6 mi). It is expected to start construction at the end of August 2024 and be completed at the end of August 2027.

The section in Hefei has a length of 34.21 km (21.26 mi) and a design speed of 120 km/h (75 mph).

The section from Tongyang to Fengle has a total length of 42.5 km (26.4 mi), of which approximately 16.1 km (10.0 mi) will pass through the Chaohu Tunnel. Construction started in 2024 and is slated for completion in 2029.

On 15 December 2022, the construction of the section from Shucheng to Jinzhai started, with a length of 170.59 km (106.00 mi). The section from Feixi, Feixi County to Shucheng has a length of 10.11 km (6.28 mi) with a design speed of 120 km/h (75 mph).

=== Henan ===
On 28 June 2021, construction began of the sections from Mount Jigong to Shangcheng (boundary of Hubei and Anhui provinces) and from Minggang to Mount Jigong. The total length of the section from Jigong Mountain to Shangcheng is 123.32 km (76.63 mi) and has a design speed of 100 km/h (62 mph).

=== Hubei ===
The section in Suizhou has a length of 75.42 km (46.86 mi) and has a design speed of 120 km/h (75 mph).

The Xiangyang section is approximately 74.09 km (46.04 mi), which includes 56.05 km (34.83 mi) in Zaoyang and 18.04 km (11.21 mi) in Xiangzhou. Construction of this section started in 2024.
