= Shijing Township, Anhui =

Shijing Township
- Subdistrict

Chinese transcription(s)
  - Chinese: 石镜乡
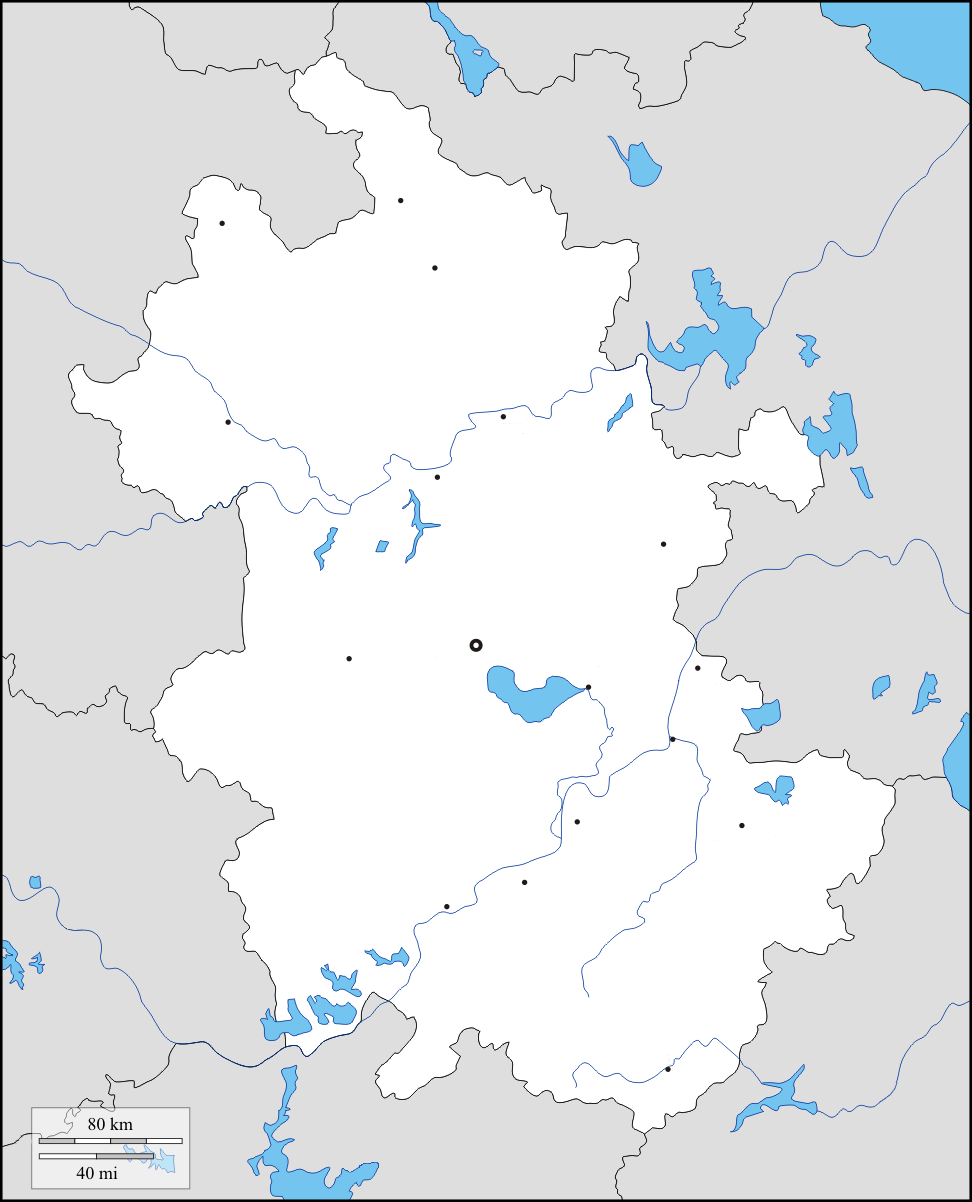
- Location in Anhui Shijing Township (China)
- Coordinates: 30°36′46″N 116°50′26″E
- Country: China
- Province: Anhui
- Prefecture: Anqing
- District: Huaining County

Area
  - Total: 48 km^{2} (19 sq mi)

Population (2004)
  - Total: 24,000
- Time zone: UTC+8 (China Standard Time)

Shijing Township (Chinese: 石镜乡) is a township-level division located in Anqing, Anhui, China. Covering an area of 48 kilometres (30 mi), it had a population of approximately 24,000 as of 2004. The township has jurisdiction over 12 village committees and host industries related to building materials, brick manufacturing, grain and oil processing and plants. Agricultural production in Shijing Township includes crops such as rice, oilseeds, and tea.

== See also ==
- List of township-level divisions of Anhui
