= Anqing =

Anqing 安庆市 Anking, Yicheng
- Prefecture-level city
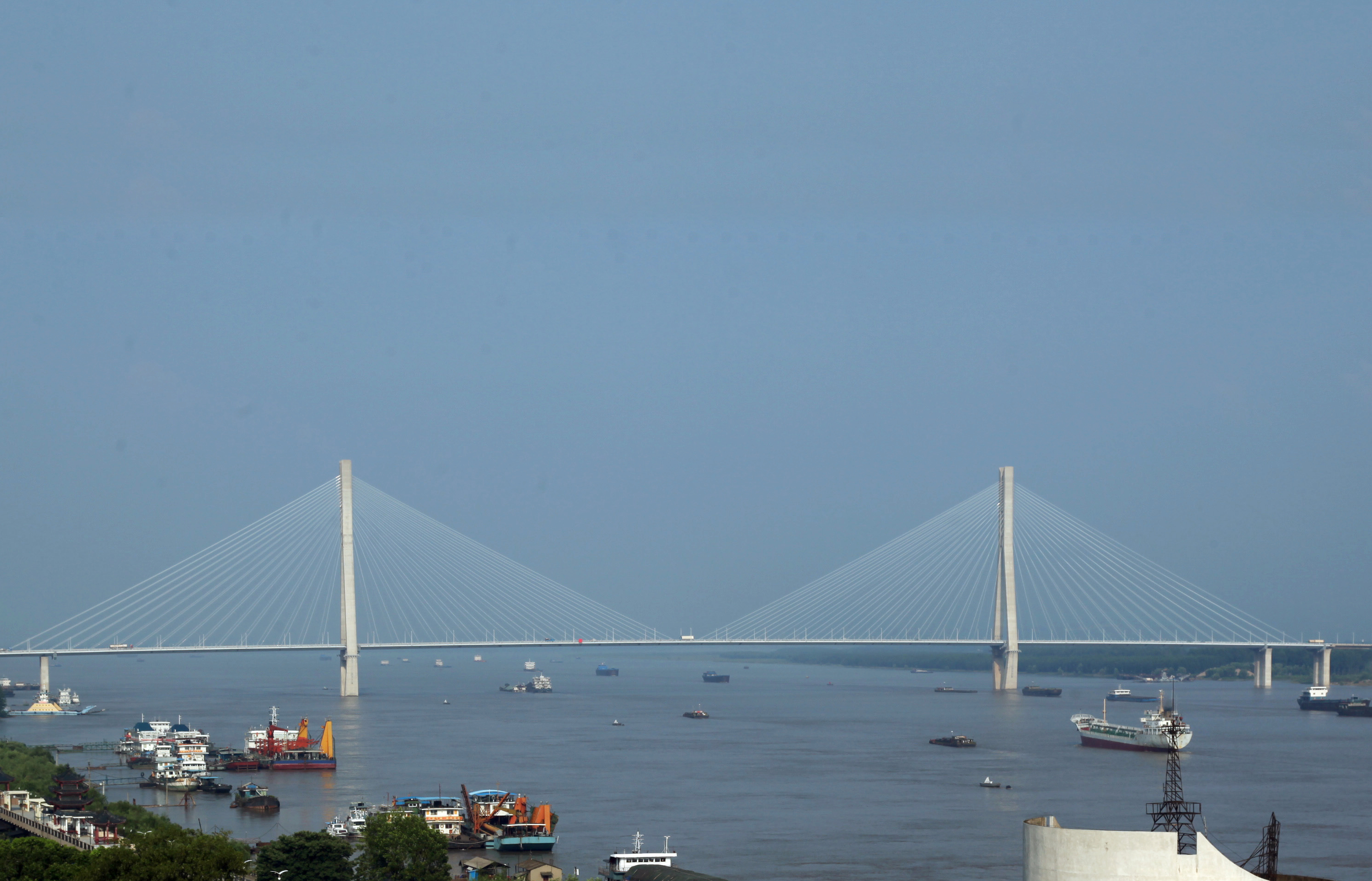
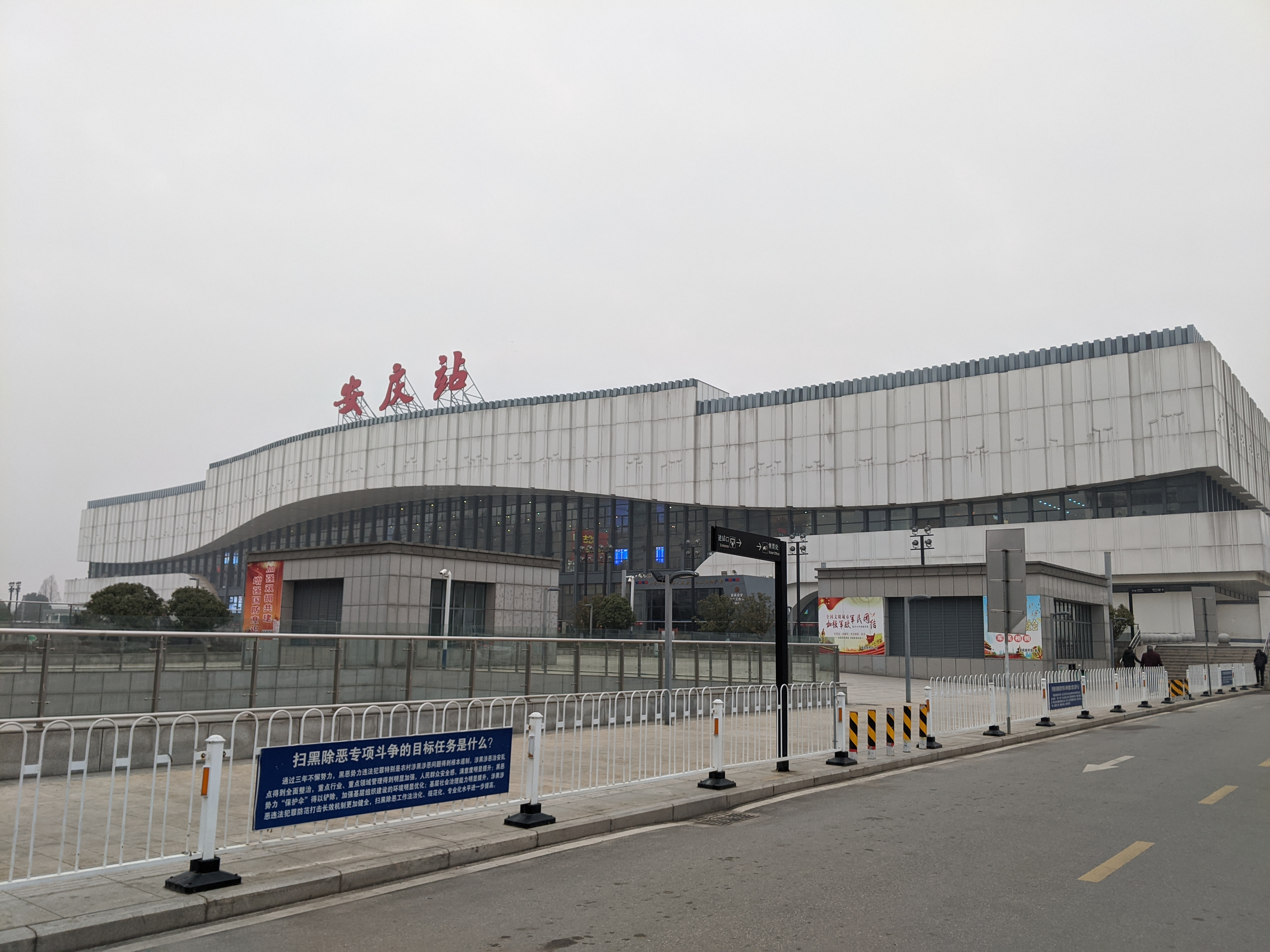
- Clockwise from top: The riverfront, the Anqing railway station, and the Anqing Yangtze River Bridge.

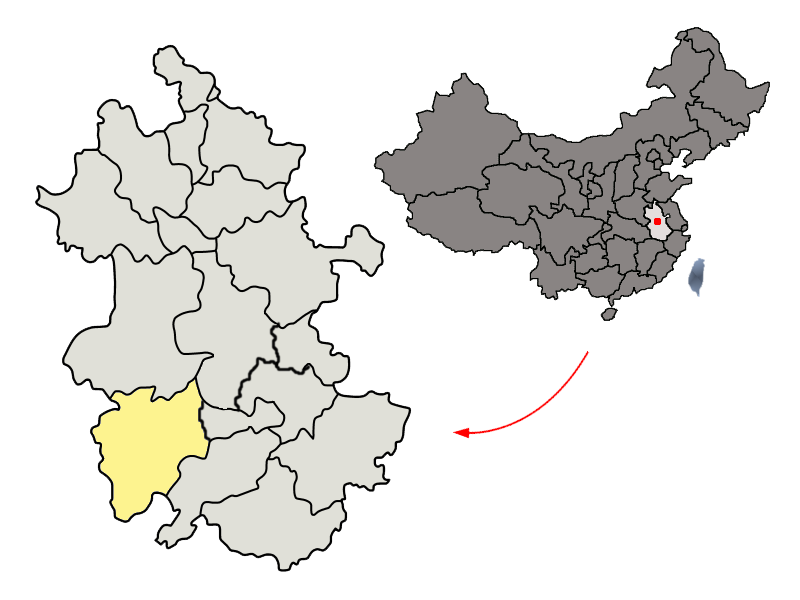
- Location of Anqing City jurisdiction in Anhui
- Coordinates (Anqing municipal government): 30°31′54″N 117°06′55″E
- Country: People's Republic of China
- Province: Anhui
- County-level divisions: 11
- Founded: 1147
- Municipal seat: Yixiu District

Government
  - CPC Secretary: Wei Xiaoming (魏晓明)
  - Mayor: Chen Bingbing (陈冰冰)

Area
  - Prefecture-level city: 13,486.6 km^{2} (5,207.2 sq mi)
  - Urban: 821.1 km^{2} (317.0 sq mi)
  - Metro: 821.1 km^{2} (317.0 sq mi)
- Highest elevation: 1,751 m (5,745 ft)

Population (2020 census)
  - Prefecture-level city: 4,165,284
  - Density: 308.846/km^{2} (799.908/sq mi)
  - Urban: 728,501
  - Urban density: 887.2/km^{2} (2,298/sq mi)
  - Metro: 728,501
  - Metro density: 887.2/km^{2} (2,298/sq mi)

GDP
  - Prefecture-level city: CN¥ 276.746 billion US$ 22.757 billion
  - Per capita: CN¥ 31,101; US$ 4,993
- Time zone: UTC+8 (CST)
- Postal code: 246000
- Area code: 0556
- ISO 3166 code: CN-AH-08
- License Plate Prefix: 皖H
- Website: www.anqing.gov.cn

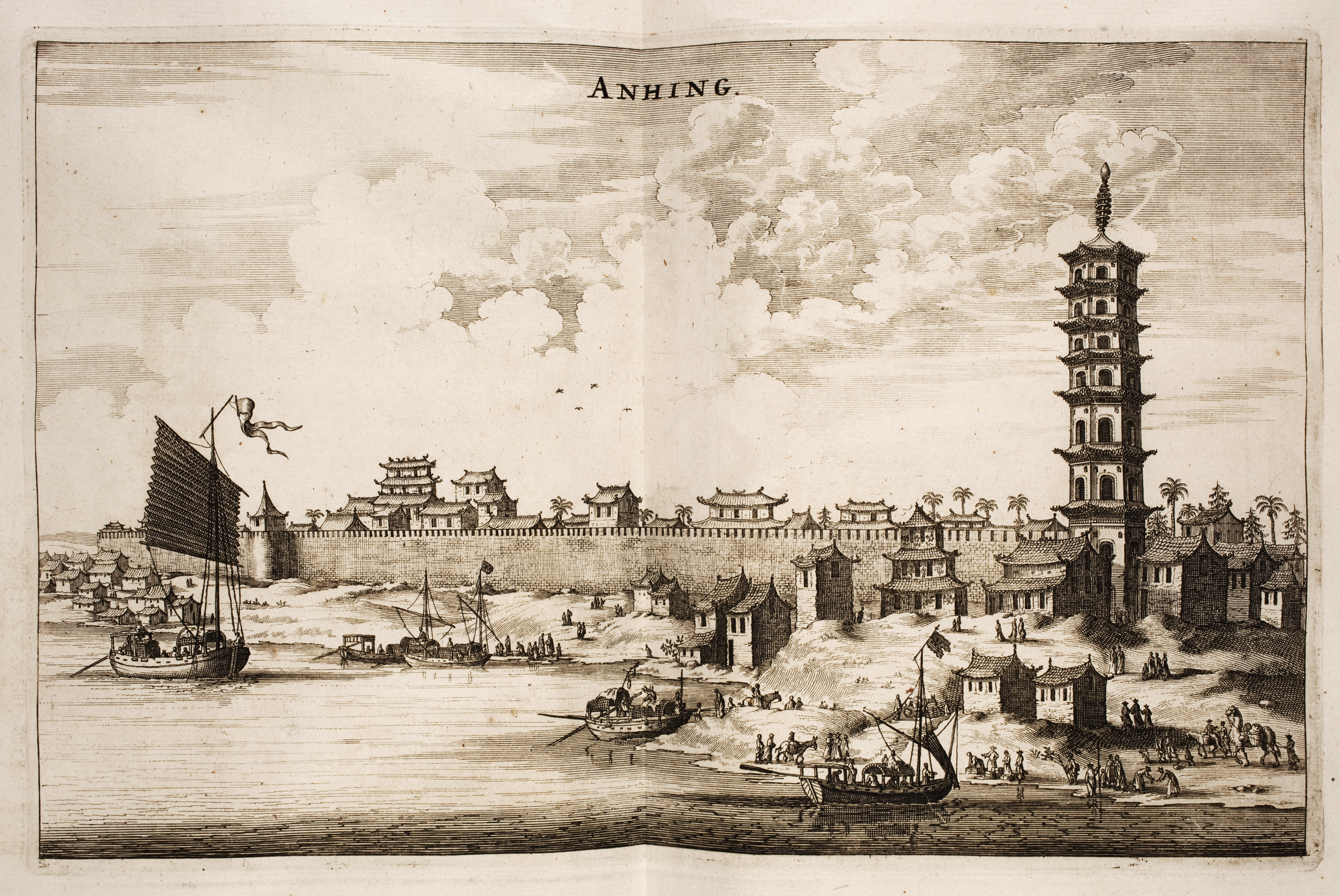
"Anhui". Nieuhof: L'ambassade de la Compagnie Orientale des Provinces Unies vers l'Empereur de la Chine, 1665

Anqing (simplified Chinese: 安庆; traditional Chinese: 安慶; pinyin: Ānqìng, also Yicheng, Nganking and formerly Hwaining, now the name of Huaining County) is a prefecture-level city in the southwest of Anhui province, People's Republic of China. Its population was 4,165,284 as of the 2020 census, with 728,501 living in the built-up (or metro) area made up of three urban districts. Anqing is famous as the birthplace of Chen Duxiu, one of the founding fathers of the Chinese Communist Party, who served as the first General Secretary of the Chinese Communist Party from 1921 to 1928. Huangmei opera, a renowned Chinese opera style, originated in the city of Anqing. This captivating art form gained immense popularity since the 1950s, largely attributed to the exceptional talents of local actors and actresses from Anqing. Huangmei opera is a significant cultural treasure that defines the rich heritage of the city of Anqing.

== Etymology ==
During the Song dynasty, the Eight Counties of Anqing were known as Shuzhou, along with the ancestral name of Tong'an, and were under the jurisdiction of the Deqing Army. In 1147, the Deqing Army was renamed, combining the last characters of Tong'an and Deqing to create Anqing, naming the army and later the settlement. Anqing itself means "peaceful and auspicious'. Anqing's other name of "Yicheng" was named by the Eastern Jin scholar Guo Pu, describing the location of Anqing as "suitable for a city."

== History ==
=== Prehistory ===
The region around Anqing contains many Neolithic cultural sites, including the Zhangsidun site, the Xuejiagang site, and the Sunjiacheng site.

=== Early Imperial Period ===
In the Warring States period, the Zhou emperor granted Qianshan County to the state of Tong, which itself was formerly in Henan. The city of Tongcheng was established around the same time.

During the Qin and Han dynasties, the town of Wancheng existed in modern-day Qianshan County, and following the unification of China by Qin Shi Huang, it belonged to Jiujiang Prefecture, before being transferred to Huainan State during the Western Han. In 164 BC, Huainan was divided into Huainan, Hengshan, and Lujiang. Later, Lujiang Prefecture would absorb Hengshan. Under the reign of Emperor Wu of Han, the region around Anqing came under the jurisdiction of Shu County and Wan County of Lujiang and Yangzhou Prefecture until the Eastern Han. During the Three Kingdoms period, the states of Cao Wei and Eastern Wu fought many times in Anqing. During this period, Shu County was abolished and came under Wan County. Following the conquest of Eastern Wu by the Western Jin, Shu County was reestablished, and in 313, the Wan County was abolished.

During the Wei, Jin, and Northern and Southern dynasties periods, the towns of Mengcheng and Wankoucheng were built near Anqing, and the town of Shankou was built in what is now Daguan District. During the Eastern Jin, between 405 and 418, Huaining County and Xinye County (now Wangjiang County) were established in place of Wan County, along with Jinxi Prefecture, located near present-day Taihu County. The seat of Huaining County was Qianshan during this period.

During the Liang dynasty, the prefecture of Yuzhou was founded and renamed Jinzhou, governing Huaining County. During the Northern Qi, Jinzhou was renamed Jiangzhou before being reverted to Jinzhou during the Chen dynasty.

At the beginning of the Sui dynasty, Jinxi Prefecture was renamed to Xizhou, which at the time governed five counties: Huaining, Susong, Taihu, Wangjiang, and Tong'an. In 607, Xizhou was renamed Tong'an, but the county seat remained in Huaining. In 626, Tong'an was renamed Dong'an and then Shuzhou. In 742, it was renamed Tong'an again, and then renamed Shengtang in 757, along with a moving of the county seat to Tongcheng. It was then finally renamed Shuzhou the following year.

=== Tang and Song Dynasties ===
During the Five Dynasties and Ten Kingdoms, Shuzhou would belong to Yang Wu, Southern Tang, and Later Zhou. In 960, the Tuanlian Prefecture of Shuzhou was promoted to defense envoy, and in 1115, the Deqing Army was established. Following the renaming of the Deqing Army to Anqing in 1147 due to name complications with a different Deqing Prefecture, the county was named Anqing. In 1195, it was promoted to prefecture status with its seat in Qianshan, governing Huaining, Tongcheng, Taihu, Susong, and Wangjiang counties.

In April 1217, the Jurchen Jin army invaded and took over the city of Guangzhou (now Huangchuan in Henan). The prefect of Anqing, Huang Gan, petitioned to build a new city in Shengtang Bay, the current location of the Anqing urban area in preparation for war. The seat of Anqing prefecture was also moved to the new Anqing city. The seat of Huaining County was also moved to Wankou (now in Daguan District).

Following the reduction of the Jin threat, the construction of new Anqing would be on and off. Following the invasion of China by the Mongols, the seat of Anqing was moved south to Guichi District, now in Chizhou, and later to Yangchazhou. For the next 30 years, Anqing would slowly fall into ruins before being rebuilt by Ma Guangzu (t 馬光祖, s 马光祖, Mǎ Guāngzǔ; 1200–1270) in 1260. In 1276, Anqing would become governed again by Huaining County, itself belonging to the Qihuang Xuanwei Division. In 1286, Xuanwei was abolished and placed directly under the Henan province. In 1323, Qianshan County was reestablished. Since then, the territory of Huaining County remained relatively stable, with Anqing governing six counties, Huaining, Tongcheng, Taihu, Susong, and Wangjiang, and Qianshan. Following the beginning of the Red Turban Rebellion, the Yuan army would rely on Anqing as a barrier to keep the rebels in.

=== Yuan and Ming Dynasties ===
In 1361, Anqing was renamed Ningjiang, before being renamed again back to Anqing. In the early Ming dynasty, Anqing was directly under the jurisdiction of Jiangning, then named Nanzhili. During the 15th century, Anqing contained 10 wards in the urban region. In the late Ming dynasty, in order to strengthen Anqing, the court separated Anqing, Luzhou, Chizhou, and Taiping from the 10 prefectures and set up a governor. In addition to these, jurisdiction also included Guangshan and Gushi in Guangzhou (now Huangchuan) in Henan, Guangji and Huangmei in Qizhou (now Qichun County in Hubei, in Huanggang and Hukou in Dehua (now Jiujiang) in Jiangxi.

=== Early Qing Period ===
In 1648, the governor of Anqing moved to Chizhou and was merged with Caojiang county to create Caofu the next year. Caojiang was first stationed in Jiangning before being moved to Anqing. In 1662, the military affairs of Caojiang were merged with the Viceroy of Liangjiang, and a special governor was placed in Anqing. In the early Qing dynasty, Anqing Prefecture was under the jurisdiction of Jiangnan Province, but in 1661 the province's administrative offices were divided, and in 1667 the western office was renamed Anhui. In 1760, the seat of Anhui was moved from Jiangning to Anqing, and from then Anqing would be the provincial capital of Anhui.

=== Late Qing Period ===
Anqing played an important role during the Taiping Rebellion. In 1853, the Taiping Army captured Anqing, leading to the moving of the capital of Anhui to Luzhou. In 1861, the Hunan Army led by Zeng Guofan, recaptured Anqing, killing thousands of soldiers and civilians. The office of the government was moved back to Anqing in 1862, and the headquarters of the Hunan Army temporarily relocated there as well.

Taiping Reforms were most present in the vicinity of Anqing. Following its recapture by the Qing government, many flour mills, granaries, and munition factories were established there. From 1861 onward they were under Chinese management, but due to the lack of skilled technicians, the factories were shut down.

Following the Chefoo Convention in 1876 between China and the United Kingdom, Anqing became a port of call for foreign shipping. Following the Mackay Treaty in 1902, it was also opened to foreign trade. However, not much trade occurred due to a lack of communications between Anqing and other regions. When railroads to the interior of Anhui reached the Yangtze River further east, Anqing lost even more importance.

=== Modern Period ===
Following the establishment of the Republic of China, the Tongmenghui would control Anqing. In January 1938, the Empire of Japan captured Anqing, leading to the provincial government's move to Lu'an, Jinzhai, and other places in advance.

In 1988, the Anqing Prefecture was merged with Anqing City, and in 1996, Tongcheng County was elevated to a county level city as well. In 2016, Congyang County was transferred to Tongling and renamed Zongyang County, and Qianshan County was elevated to a county level city in 2018.

Anqing has remained a medium-sized provincial city, an important commercial centre for the plain north of the Yangtze, and a market for tea produced in the mountains both north and south of the river. While also a local cultural centre, it has remained comparatively stagnant after losing its status as provincial capital. Its modern industrial development includes a petrochemical works that produces fuel oils and synthetic ammonia, an oil refinery, and a new port. Factories manufacturing auto parts, textiles, and building materials have also been established. In addition to its access to easy navigation on the Yangtze, Anqing is connected by railways and expressways to Hefei, Nanchang, and Wuhan. These transportation links have greatly facilitated the city's economic growth.

== Culture ==
The people of Anqing have a unique dialect that mixed with the Gan Chinese, Wu Chinese and Lower Yangtze Mandarin. The dialect of Gan spoken in Anqing is known as Huaiyue. It is therefore quite different from the rest of the province, which is predominantly Huizhou-speaking. Huangmei Opera is performed in the local dialect.

The early presence of actors from Anqing in the world of Peking opera (Beijing Opera) has significantly impacted the development of this renowned Chinese theatrical art form. This influence is evident in various aspects, including language accents and cultural nuances within Peking Opera.

== Administration ==
The prefecture-level city of Anqing administers 10 county-level divisions, including 3 districts, 2 county-level cities and 5 counties.

Administrative divisions of Anqing
Division code	Division	Area in km^{2}	Population 2020	Seat	Postal code	Subdivisions		
Division code	Division	Area in km^{2}	Population 2020	Seat	Postal code	Subdistricts	Towns	Townships (Note: Including Ethnic townships & other township related subdivisions.)
340800	Anqing	13,486.6	4,165,284	Yixiu District	246000			
340802	Yingjiang	206.9	278,700	Yicheng Road Subdistrict	246000	6	1	3
340803	Daguan	203.9	214,112	Dekuan Road Subdistrict	246000	7	1	4
340811	Yixiu	410.3	311,700	Daqiao Subdistrict	246000	2	3	2
340822	Huaining	1,276	496,683	Gaohe Town	246100		15	5
340824	Qianshan	1,686.03	441,224	Meicheng Town	246300		11	6
340825	Taihu	2,040	430,465	Jinxi Town	246400		10	6
340826	Susong	2,394	612,586	Fuyu Town	246500		9	15
340827	Wangjiang	1,347.98	462,367	Huayang Town	246200		8	2
340828	Yuexi	2,398	323,837	Tiantang Town	246600		14	10
340881	Tongcheng	1,472	593,629	Wenchang Subdistrict	231400	3	12	

== Geography ==
Anqing's geographical location has had considerable strategic significance. Zeng Guofan once stated that "the success or failure of Anqing will determine whether the world will change. Anqing is related to the overall situation in Huainan and is the basis for the recovery of Nanjing."

Anqing is located on the north bank of the Yangtze River in southwestern Anhui. It is located on the narrow section of the Yangtze Plain between the Dabie Mountains to the north and the Huang Mountains on the south bank. The Wanhe River flows through Anqing prefecture before meeting the Yangtze west of the city center. In Taihu County the Wanhe is dammed to create the Huating Lake, providing irrigation for Susong County, Wangjiang County, Huaining County, and the eastern part of Taihu County, around 1.05 Million Chinese Acres. Lower downstream from Huating Lake lies Qili Lake, located directly west of Anqing just before the confluence between the Wanhe and Yangtze. a major tributary of the Wanhe, the Qianshui, also flows through Anqing Prefecture. The Wanhe also contains many other tributaries, all of which are sourced in Anqing Prefecture.

Susong County contains Daguan and Huang Lake, both of which are geographically the same body of water. Half of Longgan Lake lies in Susong County, while the other half is in Huangmei County in Huanggang, Hubei. It is located directly across the Yangtze from Poyang Lake. Other lakes in Anqing include Po Lake between Taihu, Susong, and Wangjiang, and Wuchang Lake, which is fully in Wangjiang County. In the east of Anqing Prefecture lies Caizi Lake, which it shares with neighbouring Tongling.

Neighbouring prefectures are:

- Tongling (E)
- Chizhou (SE)
- Jiujiang, Jiangxi (S)
- Huanggang, Hubei (W)
- Lu'an (N)
- Hefei (NE)

The total area of the prefecture is 13,486.6 square kilometres (5,210 sq mi), with an urban area of 821.1 square kilometres (317 sq mi), which is only 6.1% of the total.

=== Climate ===
Anqing has a four-season, monsoon-influenced humid subtropical climate (Köppen Cfa), with chilly, damp winters and very hot, humid summers. Cold northwesterly winds from Siberia can occasionally cause nightly temperatures to drop below freezing (although snow is uncommon), while summer can see extended periods of 35 °C (95 °F)+ days. The monthly 24-hour average temperature ranges from 4.3 °C (39.7 °F) in January to 29.2 °C (84.6 °F) in July, while the annual mean is 17.20 °C (63.0 °F). Precipitation tends to reach a maximum in tandem with the meiyu (plum rains) while wintertime rainfall is generally light. With monthly percent possible sunshine ranging from 30% in March to 54% in August, the city receives 1,831 hours of bright sunshine annually.

Climate data for Anqing, elevation 62 m (203 ft), (1991–2020 normals, extremes 1951–present)
Month	Jan	Feb	Mar	Apr	May	Jun	Jul	Aug	Sep	Oct	Nov	Dec	Year
Record high °C (°F)	24.0 (75.2)	27.4 (81.3)	32.2 (90.0)	33.8 (92.8)	36.1 (97.0)	38.3 (100.9)	39.8 (103.6)	40.9 (105.6)	38.0 (100.4)	35.1 (95.2)	30.0 (86.0)	24.5 (76.1)	40.9 (105.6)
Mean daily maximum °C (°F)	7.8 (46.0)	10.7 (51.3)	15.5 (59.9)	21.9 (71.4)	26.9 (80.4)	29.5 (85.1)	32.8 (91.0)	32.3 (90.1)	28.3 (82.9)	23.0 (73.4)	16.8 (62.2)	10.3 (50.5)	21.3 (70.4)
Daily mean °C (°F)	4.4 (39.9)	6.9 (44.4)	11.3 (52.3)	17.4 (63.3)	22.6 (72.7)	25.7 (78.3)	29.1 (84.4)	28.5 (83.3)	24.4 (75.9)	18.8 (65.8)	12.5 (54.5)	6.5 (43.7)	17.3 (63.2)
Mean daily minimum °C (°F)	1.7 (35.1)	4.0 (39.2)	8.0 (46.4)	13.7 (56.7)	19.0 (66.2)	22.8 (73.0)	26.1 (79.0)	25.6 (78.1)	21.4 (70.5)	15.6 (60.1)	9.3 (48.7)	3.6 (38.5)	14.2 (57.6)
Record low °C (°F)	−10.1 (13.8)	−12.5 (9.5)	−5 (23)	−0.3 (31.5)	7.8 (46.0)	13.2 (55.8)	16.0 (60.8)	17.6 (63.7)	11.7 (53.1)	3.0 (37.4)	−3.8 (25.2)	−8.5 (16.7)	−12.5 (9.5)
Average precipitation mm (inches)	63.6 (2.50)	80.1 (3.15)	124.4 (4.90)	150.8 (5.94)	174.5 (6.87)	268.6 (10.57)	251.0 (9.88)	137.4 (5.41)	62.8 (2.47)	61.1 (2.41)	66.7 (2.63)	38.2 (1.50)	1,479.2 (58.23)
Average precipitation days (≥ 0.1 mm)	10.8	10.7	13.7	12.9	12.4	13.5	11.8	11.2	7.5	8.1	8.8	7.9	129.3
Average snowy days	4.4	2.4	1.1	0	0	0	0	0	0	0	0.4	1.5	9.8
Average relative humidity (%)	75	74	74	73	74	79	77	78	76	73	74	72	75
Mean monthly sunshine hours	97.1	100.5	123.6	150.2	162.5	140.5	203.4	197.7	162.6	155.3	130.9	122.5	1,746.8
Percentage possible sunshine	30	32	33	39	38	33	48	49	44	44	41	39	39
Source: China Meteorological Administration Pogodaiklimat.ru (extremes)NOAA

== Politics ==
Currently, Anqing's communist party secretary is Zhang Xiangan, appointed in March 2021. The director of the committee in Anqing is Zhou Dongming, in office since April 2021. The mayor of Anqing is Zhang Junyi, in office since August 2021.

The party committee secretaries since 1988 have been:

- Fang Zhaoxiang (January 1988 - December 1991)
- Wang Shiman (December 1991 - January 1997)
- Chen Luxiang (January 1997 - October 2000)
- Zhao Shucong (October 2000 - January 2003)
- Han Xiancong (April 2003 - February 2008)
- Zhu Duwen (February 2008 - February 2013)
- Yu Aihua (February 2013 - March 2016)
- Wei Xiamong (March 2016 - March 2021)
- Zhang Xiangan (March2021 - Present)

The mayors since 1988 have been:

- Liu Sikui (August 1988 - January 1994)
- Zhou Gongshun (January 1994 - January 1999)
- Zhao Shucong (January 1999 - February 2001)
- Han Xiancong (February 2001 - April 2003)
- Zhu Duwen (April 2003 - April 2008)
- Xiao Chaoying (May 2008 - August 2012)
- Yu Aihua (August 2012 - February 2013)
- Wei Xiaoming (March 2013 - April 2016)
- Chen Bingbing (April 2016 - August 2021)
- Zhang Junyi (August 2021 – Present)

== Demographics ==
Prefecture Population
Year	Pop.	±% p.a.
1953	2,712,301	—
1964	2,815,056	+0.34%
1982	4,247,074	+2.31%
1990	4,681,336	+1.22%
2000	4,422,069	−0.57%
2010	4,472,667	+0.11%
2020	4,165,284	−0.71%
Population size may be affected by changes on administrative divisions.

Urban Population
Year	Pop.	±% p.a.
1922	100,000	—
1929	111,221	+1.53%
1933	121,379	+2.21%
1953	105,267	−0.71%
1964	165,366	+4.19%
1982	418,772	+5.30%
1990	493,238	+2.07%
2000	443,808	−1.05%
2010	570,538	+2.54%
2020	728,501	+2.47%
Population size may be affected by changes on administrative divisions.

As of the 2020 Census, the prefecture-level city of Anqing's population is 4,165,284, a decline from 2010 when it had a population of 4,472,667. Overall Anqing's population increased rapidly during the 20th century before peaking in the early 2010s. Since then it has declined. The urban population of Anqing is 728,501.

=== Vital Statistics ===
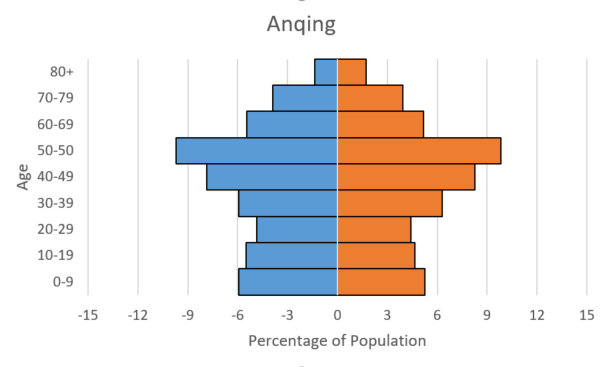
Population Pyramid of Anqing

Anqing is approximately 50.5% male and 49.5% female, of which there are a higher proportion of male children and female adults. It has an urban population of around 2.3 million and a rural population of 1.9 million, which is 55.5% and 44.5% respectively. The largest age demographic of the people in Anqing is between 50 and 59 years, which represents a general aging of the population, leaving not many children left. This can be seen in the rest of China as well.

=== Ethnic Statistics ===
The Han Chinese population is 4.1 million, or 99.58%, while the ethnic minority population is 17,662.

=== Urban Areas ===
Population by urban areas of towns and cities over 100,000 people
#	City	Urban area	District area	City proper	Census date
1	Anqing	728,501	738,476	780,514	2020-11-01
2	Tongcheng	238,712	398,423	664,455	2020-11-01
3	Qianshan	197,770	238,099	500,292	2020-11-01
4	Jinxi	163,377	176,506	515,283	2020-11-01
5	Gaohe	157,786	241,120	592,750	2020-11-01
6	Fuyu	149,569	245,326	571,025	2020-11-01
7	Meicheng	121,457	see Qianshan	see Qianshan	2020-11-01
8	Huayang	114,353	160,313	526,712	2020-11-01

== Economy ==
Anqing is home to many industries, such as petrochemicals, textiles, agriculture, machinery, auto parts, and many others. Anqing is defined by the State Council as one of the three major regional central cities in the province, and one of six major transportation hubs. Anqing is one of the largest economies in Anhui with a gdp of almost 247 billion yuan, or around 33 billion US dollars. It is growing at a rate of around 4%.

Large companies in Anqing include Anqing Petrochemical, Huamao Co. which manufactures textiles, along with many foreign joint ventures with the government.

== Transport ==
Anqing has two Yangtze River crossings, the Anqing Yangtze River Bridge and the Wangdong Yangtze River Bridge. Other highways in Anqing include National Highway 206, National Highway 236, National Highway 318, National Highway 347, the G50 Shanghai-Chongqing Expressway, the Hefei-Anqing Expressway, the G4231 Nanjing-Jiujiang Expressway, also known as the Ningjiu Expressway, and the G4221 Shanghai-Wuhan Expressway. The G50 Shanghai-Chongqing Expressway also crosses the Anqing Yangtze River Bridge.

Anqing Tianzhushan Airport serves the city.

The Nanjing–Anqing Intercity Railway opened in December 2015, allowing a 90-minute journey time to Nanjing, and 3 hours to Shanghai. Wuhan-Hangzhou High-Speed Railway is also under construction. Along with this, the Anqing Railway connects to the Hefei-Jiujiang railway. The Lu'an-Anqing high-speed railway is also under construction.

One of the bus operators in Anqing, the Anqing Zhongbei Bus Company, is owned by a joint venture between Nanjing Public Utilities Development (formerly Nanjing Zhongbei) and RATP Dev Transdev Asia (RDTA). RDTA itself is a joint venture between Transdev and RATP Dev.

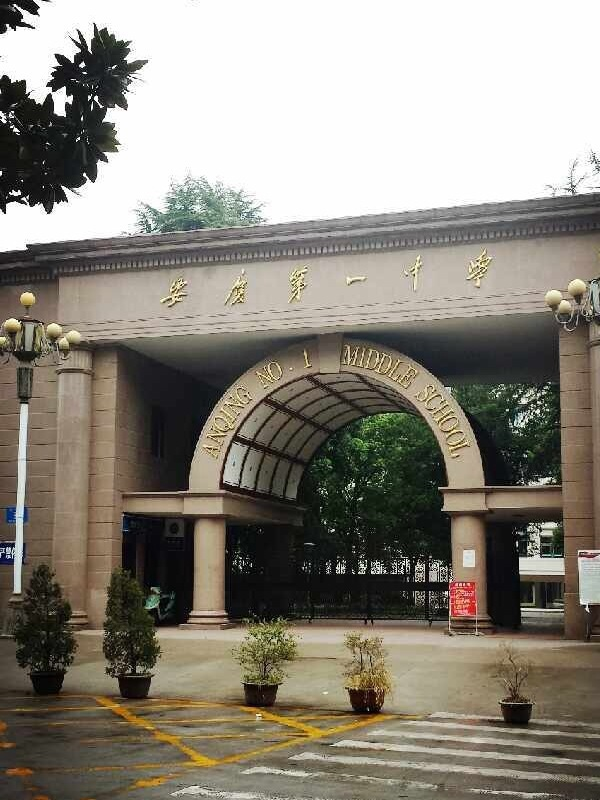
Anqing No. 1 Middle School

== Tourism ==
- Mount Tianzhu Scenic Resort, a popular hiking spot that also contains spectacular peaks, rocks, secluded caves, and canyons.
- The Zhenfeng Pagoda, a Buddhist pagoda built in 1570 during the late Ming dynasty, contains over six hundred Buddha statues.
- The Huangmei Opera As one of China's six major traditional operas, Huangmei Opera derives its name from its birthplace, Huangmei County in Hubei Province. It developed primarily in the areas surrounding Anqing and Susong County, evolving by the mid-19th century into a fully-fledged theatrical form integrating dance and vocal performance. Following the Second World War, it gained nationwide prominence under the People's Republic of China. Recognized as the cradle of Huangmei Opera, Anqing City has hosted the Huangmei Opera Festival periodically, with editions held in 1992, 1996, and 2003.
- The Yingjiang Temple, built in 974 under Emperor Taizu, who also founded the Song dynasty. The Zhenfeng Pagoda is part of the greater Yingjiang Temple complex.
- Zhao Puchu, a religious and public leader who was one of the most renowned Chinese Calligraphers and president of the Buddhist Association of China was born in Taihu County, where a monument in his childhood residence is.
- Deng Shiru, a calligrapher during the Qing dynasty was born in Huaining County. A monument in his former residence also exists.

== Sister cities ==
- Calabasas, United States
- Ibaraki, Japan
- Cheboksary, Russia
- Kütahya, Turkey

== See also ==
- Sacred Heart Cathedral, Anqing
