= 10,000 Buddhas =

10,000 Buddhas may refer to:

- City of Ten Thousand Buddhas, in Ukiah, California
- Kek Lok Si Temple, called the "Pagoda of the Ten-Thousand Buddhas", in Penang, Malaysia
- Ten Thousand Buddhas Monastery, in Hong Kong
- Yulin Caves, called the "Ten Thousand Buddhas Caves", in Anxi County, Gansu Province, China
- Zhenfeng Pagoda, called the "Ten-thousand Buddhas", in Anqing, Anhui Province, China

== See also ==
- List of named Buddhas
