= Zhenfeng =

Zhenfeng may refer to:

- Zhenfeng County, in Guizhou, China
- Zhenfeng Pagoda, in Anqing, Anhui, China
