= G4223 Wuhan–Chongqing Expressway =

Road in China

Wuhan–Chongqing Expressway
- 武汉－重庆高速公路
- Wuyu Expressway 武渝高速公路

Route information
- Auxiliary route of G42

Major junctions
- West end: Chongqing
- East end: G4 / G4201 / Hubei S15 in Wuhan, Hubei

Location
- Country: China

Highway system
- National Trunk Highway System; Primary; Auxiliary; National Highways; Transport in China
← G4222	→ G4231

The G4223 Wuhan–Chongqing Expressway (Chinese: 武汉—重庆高速公路), also referred to as the Wuyu Expressway (Chinese: 武渝高速公路), is an expressway in China that connects Wuhan, Hubei to Chongqing.

== Route ==
Wuyu Expressway in Hubei

The expressway starts in Wuhan, passes through Hanchuan, Tianmen, Shayang, Dangyang, Yichang, Zigui, Badong, Wushan, Fengjie, Yunyang, Wanzhou, Zhongxian, Fengdu, Fuling, and Changshou, and ends in the main urban area of Chongqing.
