= Taihu County =

Taihu 太湖县
- County
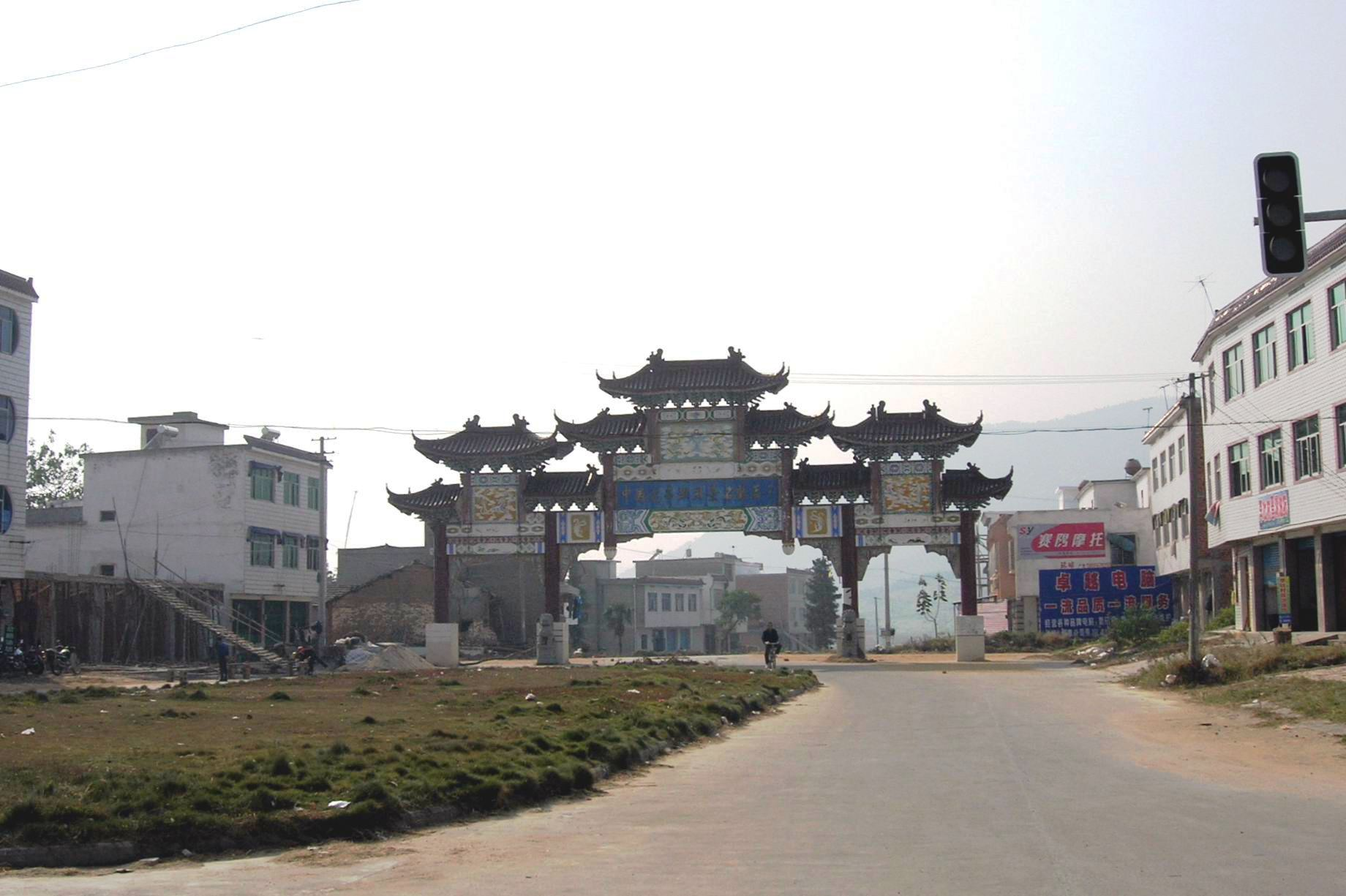

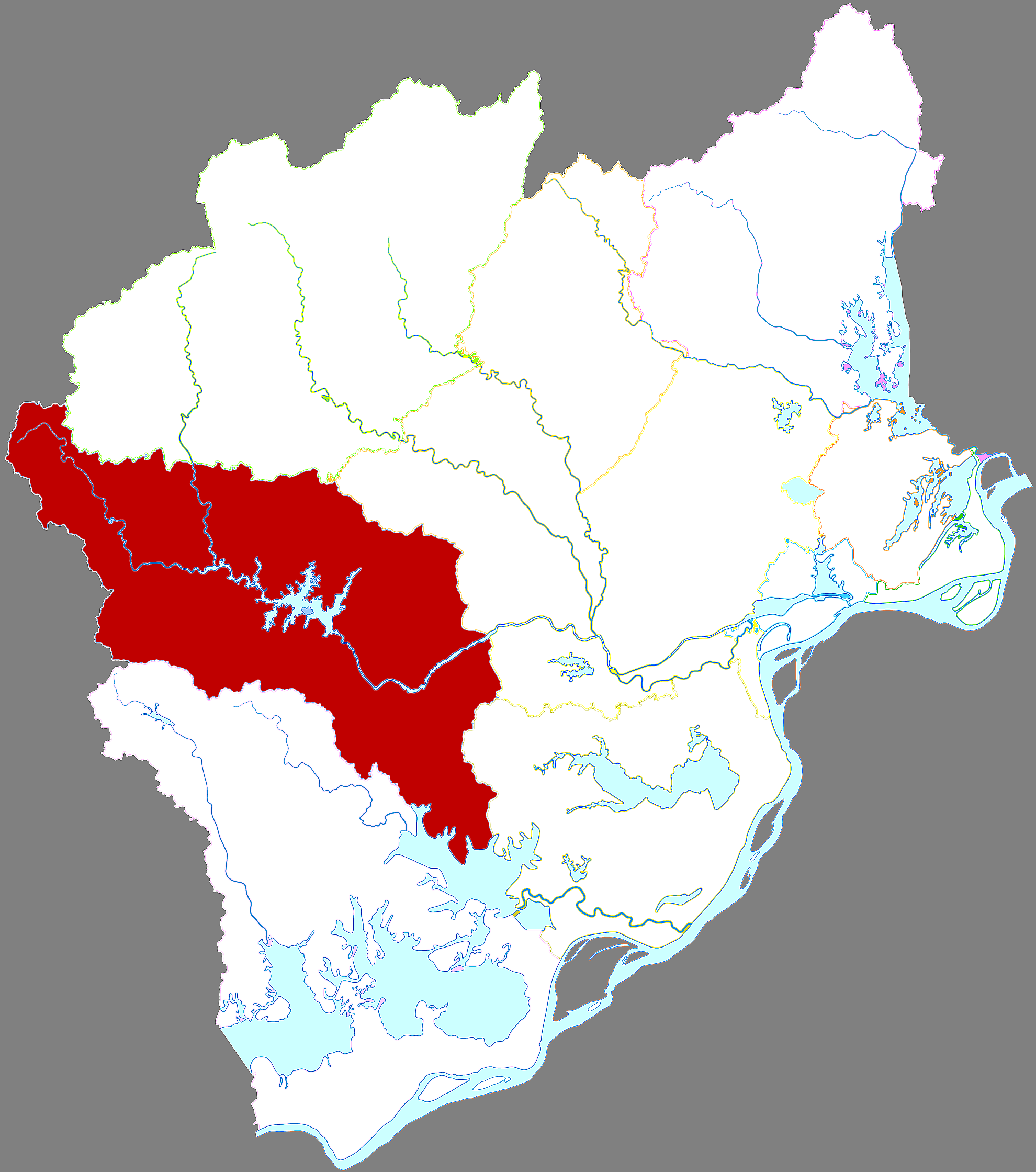
- Taihu in Anqing

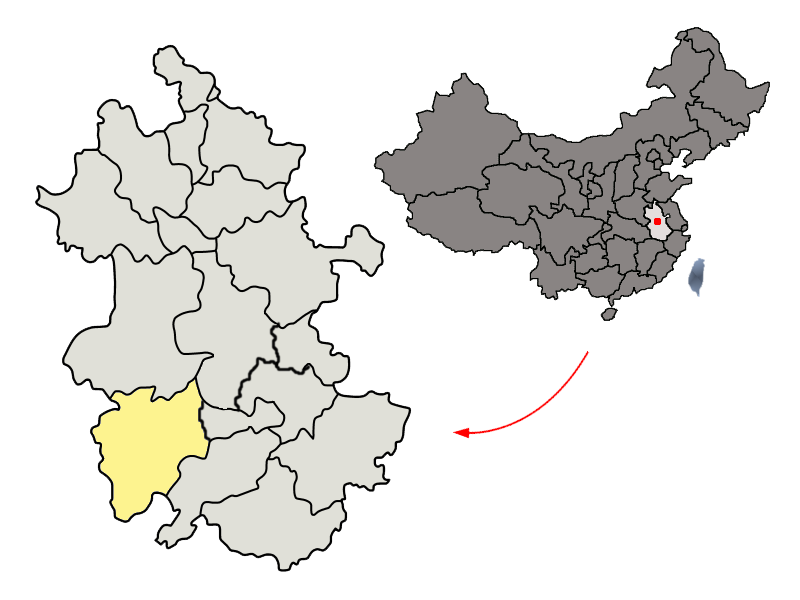
- Anqing in Anhui
- Coordinates: 30°27′14″N 116°18′32″E
- Country: China
- Province: Anhui
- Prefecture-level city: Anqing
- County seat: Jinxi

Area
  - Total: 2,040 km^{2} (790 sq mi)

Population (2020)
  - Total: 430,465
  - Density: 211/km^{2} (547/sq mi)
- Time zone: UTC+8 (China Standard)
- Postal code: 246400

Taihu County (Chinese: 太湖县; pinyin: Tàihú Xiàn) is a county in the southwest of Anhui Province, China, bordering Hubei Province to the west. It is under the jurisdiction of the prefecture-level city of Anqing and contains its westernmost point. It has a population of 560,000 and an area of 2,031 km^{2} (784 sq mi). The seat of government is located in Jingxi Town.

Taihu is noted for its "Huating Lake" with its mountains and scenic waters. The lake was originally built for flood control and power generation with a dam constructed in the 1960s. Although it was formerly blamed for destroying large areas of farm land, it has evolved into a popular tourism location.

The county has a long history of Zen, an important tributary of Chinese Buddhism.

== Administrative divisions ==
Taihu County has jurisdiction over 10 towns and 5 townships.

Towns

- Jinxi (晋熙镇), Xuqiao (徐桥镇), Xiaochi (小池镇), Xincang (新仓镇), Siqian (寺前镇), Tianhua (天华镇), Niuzhen (牛镇镇), Mituo (弥陀镇), Beizhong (北中镇), Baili (百里镇)

Townships

- Chengxi Township (城西乡), Jiangtang Township (江塘乡), Dashi Township (大石乡), Yangquan Township (汤泉乡), Liufan Township (刘畈乡)

== Climate ==
Climate data for Taihu, elevation 105 m (344 ft), (1991–2020 normals, extremes 1991–present)
Month	Jan	Feb	Mar	Apr	May	Jun	Jul	Aug	Sep	Oct	Nov	Dec	Year
Record high °C (°F)	22.9 (73.2)	26.7 (80.1)	31.1 (88.0)	33.2 (91.8)	35.5 (95.9)	37.4 (99.3)	39.6 (103.3)	39.7 (103.5)	36.9 (98.4)	35.9 (96.6)	29.6 (85.3)	22.6 (72.7)	39.7 (103.5)
Mean daily maximum °C (°F)	8.3 (46.9)	11.1 (52.0)	15.8 (60.4)	22.1 (71.8)	26.9 (80.4)	29.2 (84.6)	32.3 (90.1)	32.3 (90.1)	28.6 (83.5)	23.5 (74.3)	17.4 (63.3)	10.9 (51.6)	21.5 (70.8)
Daily mean °C (°F)	4.3 (39.7)	6.8 (44.2)	11.0 (51.8)	17.1 (62.8)	22.1 (71.8)	25.1 (77.2)	28.2 (82.8)	27.8 (82.0)	24.1 (75.4)	18.7 (65.7)	12.5 (54.5)	6.5 (43.7)	17.0 (62.6)
Mean daily minimum °C (°F)	1.3 (34.3)	3.5 (38.3)	7.4 (45.3)	13.0 (55.4)	18.2 (64.8)	21.9 (71.4)	24.9 (76.8)	24.5 (76.1)	20.5 (68.9)	14.8 (58.6)	8.8 (47.8)	3.2 (37.8)	13.5 (56.3)
Record low °C (°F)	−8.3 (17.1)	−6.3 (20.7)	−3.2 (26.2)	2.8 (37.0)	9.5 (49.1)	15.5 (59.9)	16.5 (61.7)	17.6 (63.7)	11.3 (52.3)	0.0 (32.0)	−3.2 (26.2)	−11.7 (10.9)	−11.7 (10.9)
Average precipitation mm (inches)	58.6 (2.31)	79.4 (3.13)	110.6 (4.35)	154.3 (6.07)	196.0 (7.72)	292.9 (11.53)	232.4 (9.15)	141.8 (5.58)	81.7 (3.22)	54.4 (2.14)	63.8 (2.51)	36.6 (1.44)	1,502.5 (59.15)
Average precipitation days (≥ 0.1 mm)	11.2	11.7	14.3	13.8	13.8	15.1	13.1	13.0	8.1	8.7	9.2	8.7	140.7
Average snowy days	3.8	2.1	0.7	0	0	0	0	0	0	0	0.1	1.3	8
Average relative humidity (%)	73	73	74	73	75	81	81	79	74	70	72	70	75
Mean monthly sunshine hours	105.9	105.1	126.1	154.6	170.7	147.0	198.7	204.8	178.8	166.1	145.3	133.0	1,836.1
Percentage possible sunshine	33	33	34	40	40	35	46	50	49	47	46	42	41
Source: China Meteorological Administration
