= Deng Shiru =

Deng Shirú (Teng Shih-ju, traditional: 鄧石如, simplified: 邓石如; c. 1739/1743–1805) was a Chinese calligrapher during the Qing Dynasty (1644–1912).

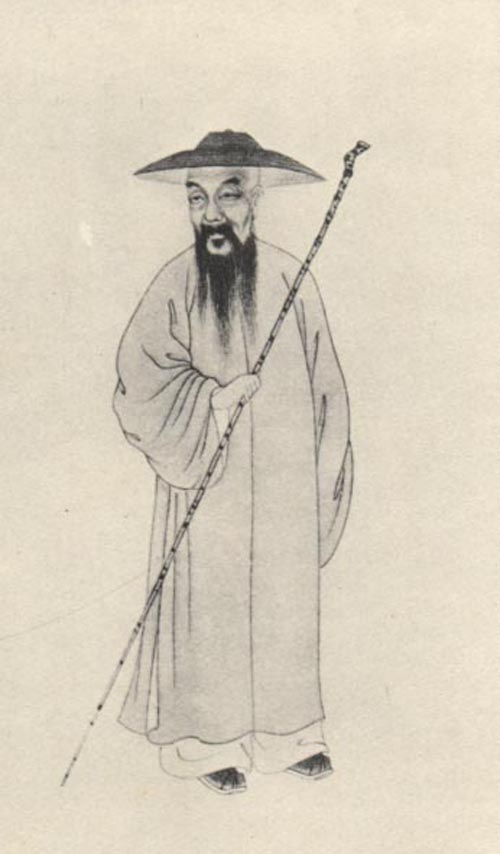
A painting of Deng Shiru.

Deng was born in Huaining 懷寧 in the Anhui 安徽 province. His style name was 'Wanbo' 顽伯 and his sobriquets were 'Wanbai shanren 皖白山人, Wan bai 完白, Guhuan, Gu wanzi 故浣子, Youji daoren 游笈道人, Fengshui yuzhang 鳳水漁長, and Longshan qiaozhang 龍山樵長'. Deng studied at the Shen Chun Academy. He later learned the art of Seal cutting.

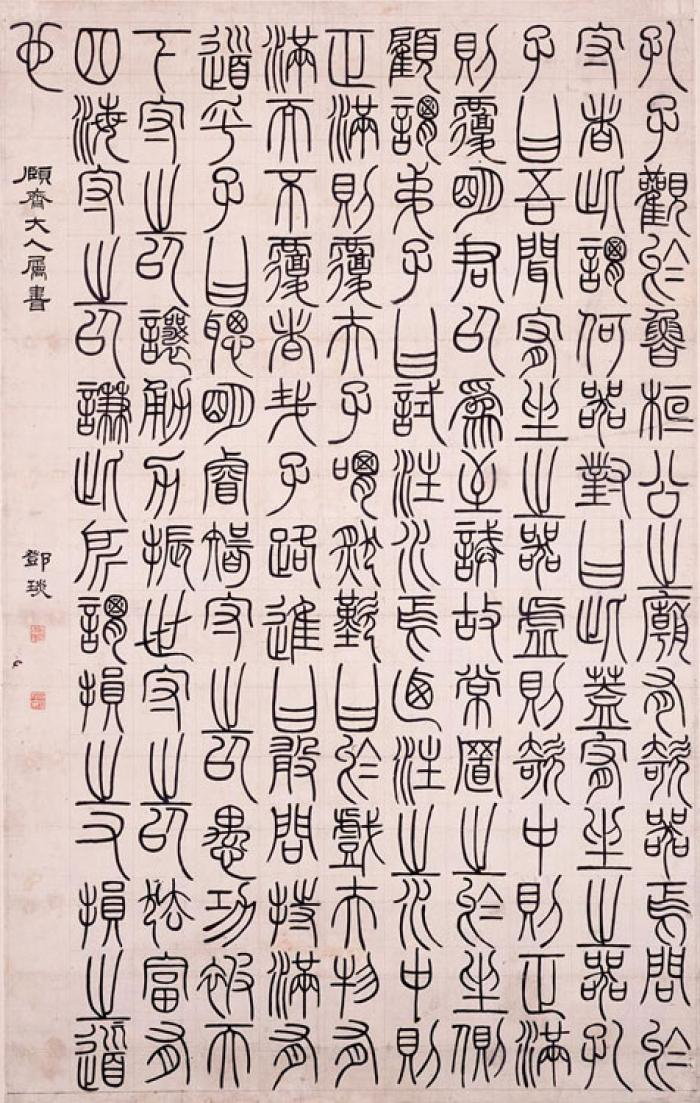
Deng Shiru, Ancient Prose from the Xunzi, done in seal script, Collections of the Palace Museum 1796
