= Shu Prefecture =

Historical administrative division in Anhui, China

Shuzhou (Chinese: 舒州; pinyin: Shūzhōu) was a Chinese zhou (prefecture) in Anhui Province. It was located roughly where modern Anqing now lies.

Governors and prefects of Shuzhou in the Tang dynasty include Zhang Zhenzhou (張鎭周), Lü Yongzhi (呂用之), Li Sujie (李素節) and Gao Yu (高澞, grandnephew of Gao Pian, 高駢)
