= Daqiao Subdistrict, Anqing =

Daqiao Subdistrict 大桥街道
- Subdistrict
- Location in China
- Coordinates: 30°31′12″N 117°4′21″E
- Country: People's Republic of China
- Province: Anhui
- Prefecture-level city: Anqing
- District: Yixiu District
- Time zone: UTC+8 (China Standard)

Daqiao Subdistrict (simplified Chinese: 大桥街道; traditional Chinese: 大橋街道; pinyin: Dàqiáo Jiēdào) is a subdistrict in Yixiu District, Anqing, Anhui province, China. As of 2018, it has 12 residential communities and 4 villages under its administration.

== See also ==
- List of township-level divisions of Anhui
