= Zhang Zhenzhou =

Tang dynasty governor

Zhang Zhenzhou (Chinese: 張鎭周, fl. 7th century) was a Chinese Tang dynasty politician and Governor of Shuzhou (舒州) in Anhui.

When he was appointed Governor of Shuzhou, his native place, he proceeded to his old home and spent ten days in feasting his relatives and friends. Then, calling them together, he gave to each a present of money and silk, and took leave of them with tears in his eyes, saying, "We have had this pleasant time together as old friends. Tomorrow I take up my appointment as Governor; after that, we can meet no more." The result was an impartial and successful administration.
