= Jinxi, Anhui =

Jinxi 晋熙镇
- Town
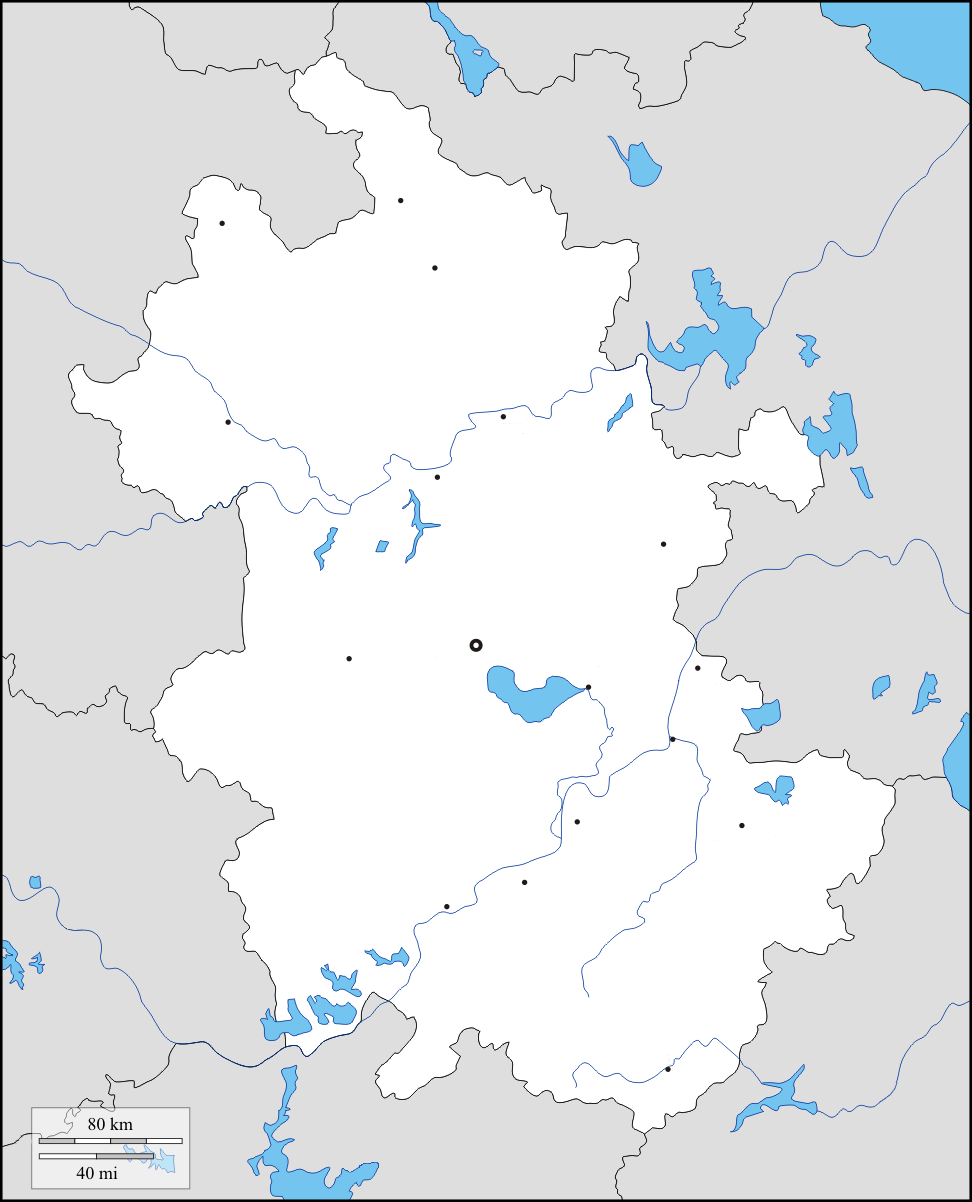
- Location in Anhui Jinxi (China)
- Coordinates: 30°27′8″N 116°17′20″E
- Country: People's Republic of China
- Province: Anhui
- Prefecture-level city: Anqing
- County: Taihu County
- Time zone: UTC+8 (China Standard)

Jinxi (simplified Chinese: 晋熙; traditional Chinese: 晉熙; pinyin: Jìnxī) is a town under the administration of Taihu County in Anqing, Anhui, China. As of 2018, it has 8 residential communities and 14 villages under its administration.

== See also ==
- List of township-level divisions of Anhui
