= Yingjiang Temple =

Buddhist temple in Anhui, China

- 迎江寺
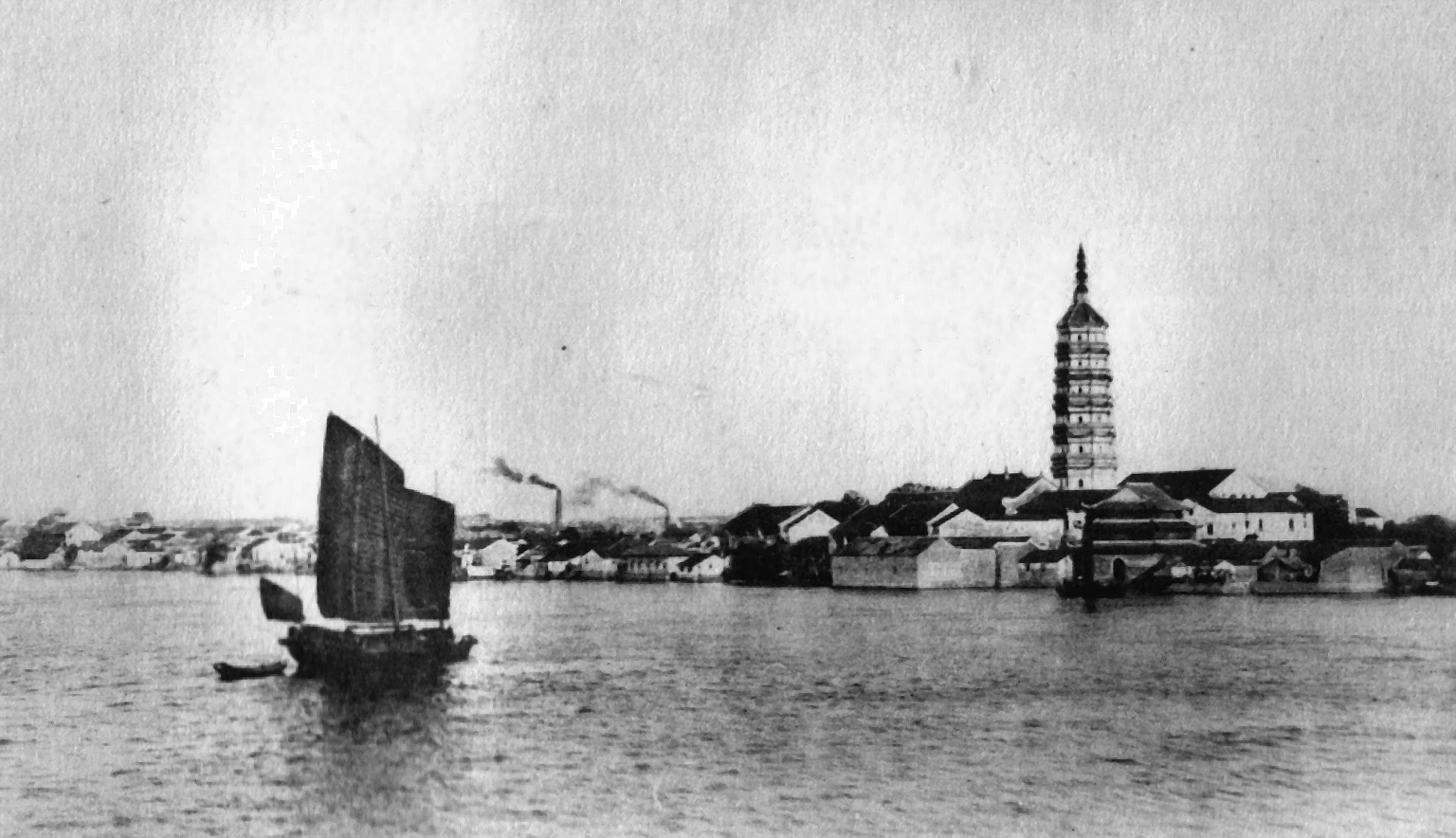
- A distant view of Yingfeng Temple in 1929.

Religion
- Affiliation: Buddhism
- Sect: Chan Buddhism
- Leadership: Shi Shengquan (释圣权)

Location
- Location: Yingjiang District, Anqing, Anhui
- Country: China
- Interactive map of Yingjiang Temple
- Coordinates: 30°30′24″N 117°03′40″E

Architecture
- Style: Chinese architecture
- Established: 974
- Completed: 1862 (reconstruction)

Yingfeng Temple (Chinese: 迎江寺; pinyin: Yíngjiāng Sì) is a Buddhist temple located in Yingjiang District of Anqing, Anhui, China.

== History ==
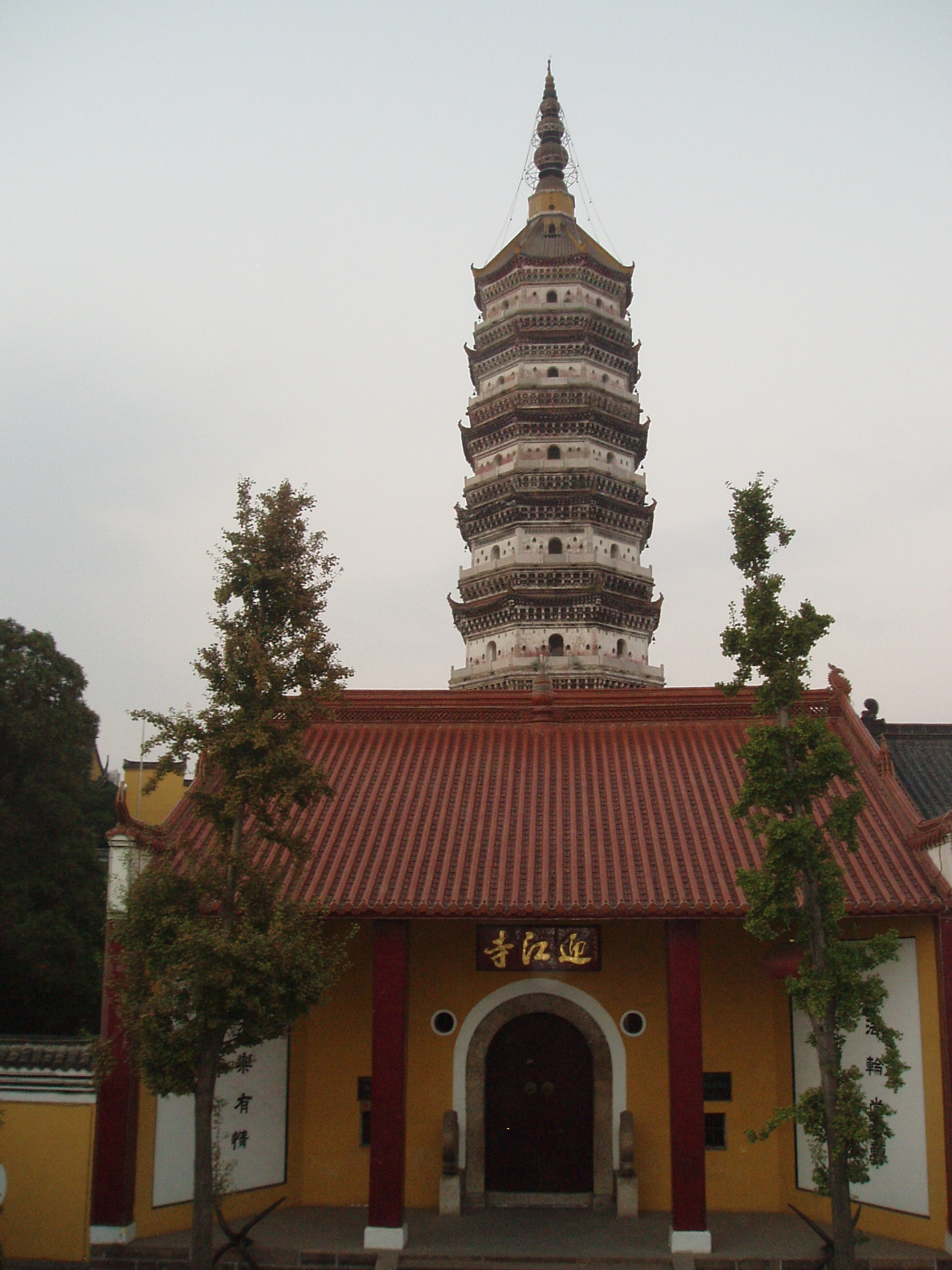
A front view of Yingfeng Temple.

=== Song dynasty ===
The temple was first built in 974, under Emperor Taizu (960–976) rule in the recently founded Song dynasty (960–1279).

=== Ming dynasty ===
In 1619, in the reign of Wanli Emperor (1573–1620) of the Ming dynasty (1368–1644), Ruan Zihua (阮自华), a local gentleman, rebuilt the temple. In the following year, Emperor Guangzong (1620) inscribed and honored the name "Huguo Yongchang Chan Temple" (护国永昌禅寺).

=== Qing dynasty and Republic of China ===
A war left the temple in ruins in 1861, in the ruling of Xianfeng Emperor (1851–1861) in the Qing dynasty (1644–1911). It was restored and renamed "Yingjiang Temple" (迎江寺) in 1862, in the 1st year of Tongzhi period (1862–1874). Sixteen years later, master Yuexia (月霞) was proposed as the new abbot of Yingjiang Temple. He was dismissed after voicing his strong opposition to the restoration of monarchy by Yuan Shikai in 1916. His disciple Xinjian (心坚) succeeded the position.

=== People's Republic of China ===
After the establishment of the Communist State in 1949, the Anhui Provincial Government provided great protection for the temple.

After the 3rd Plenary Session of the 11th Central Committee of the Chinese Communist Party, according to the national policy of free religious belief, the administrative power was transferred to the local Buddhist association.

Yingjiang Temple has been designated as a National Key Buddhist Temple in Han Chinese Area by the State Council of China in 1983.

== Architecture ==
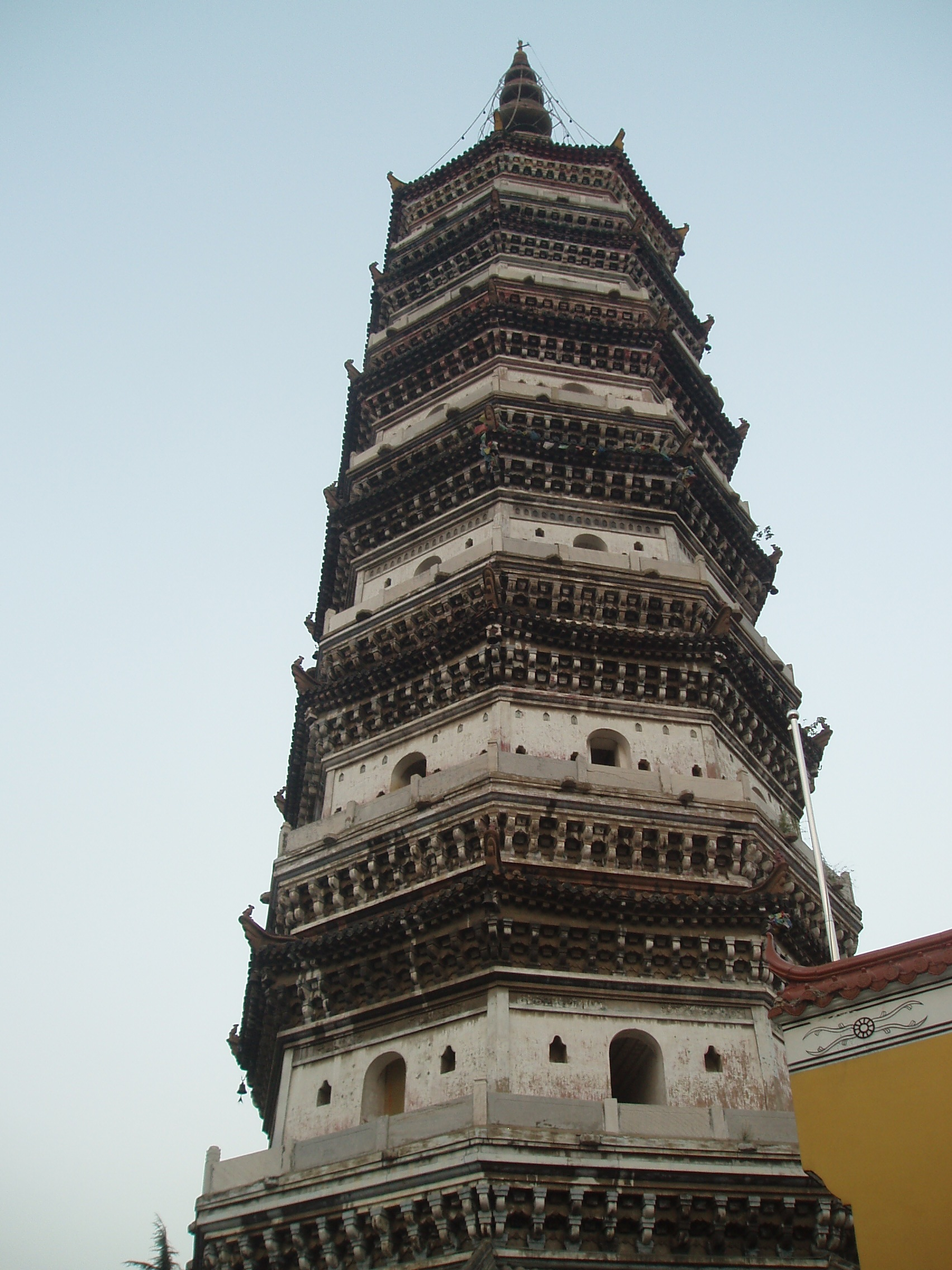
Zhenfeng Pagoda at Yingjiang Temple.

Now the existing main buildings include Shanmen, Heavenly Kings Hall, Mahavira Hall, Pilu Hall, Buddhist Texts Library and Zhenfeng Pagoda.

=== Heavenly Kings Hall ===
The statues of Maitreya Buddha, Skanda and Four Heavenly Kings are enshrined in the Hall of Four Heavenly Kings. The hall is 10.4 metres (34 ft) high and covers a building area of 300 square metres (3,200 sq ft).

=== Mahavira Hall ===
The Mahavira Hall is the main hall in the temple. Statues of Sakyamuni, Amitabha and Bhaisajyaguru are placed in the middle of the hall. Statues of Manjushri and Samantabhadra are placed at the back. And the statues of Eighteen Arhats sitting on the seats before both sides of the gable walls. The Mahavira Hall is 17.72 metres (58.1 ft) high and occupies a building area of 409 square metres (4,400 sq ft).

=== Pilu Hall ===
The Pilu Hall (毗卢殿) enshrining the statues of Vairocana, Brahma and Indra. At the back are statues of Guanyin with Shancai standing on the left and Longnü on the right.

=== Buddhist Texts Library ===
The Buddhist Texts Library is 16.2 metres (53 ft) high and occupies a building area of 981 square metres (10,560 sq ft). It is divided into three storeys. Statues of the Three Sages of the West (西方三圣), namely Guanyin, Amitabha and Mahasthamaprapta, are enshrined in the middle storey.

=== Zhenfeng Pagoda ===
The Zhenfeng Pagoda (振风塔) was originally built in the Song dynasty (960–1279) and reconstructed in 1570 in the reign of Longqing Emperor (1567–1572) of the Ming dynasty (1368–1644). It initially called "Ten Thousand Buddha Pagoda" (万佛塔). The 64.8-metre-high (213 ft) pagoda has the brick-and-wood structure with seven storeys and eight sides. Curved bars and cornices are set on each story, which are magnificent and become the symbol of Yingjiang Temple. Over 1,200 statues of Buddha are enshrined in its interior.
