= Yixiu District =

Yixiu 宜秀区
- District
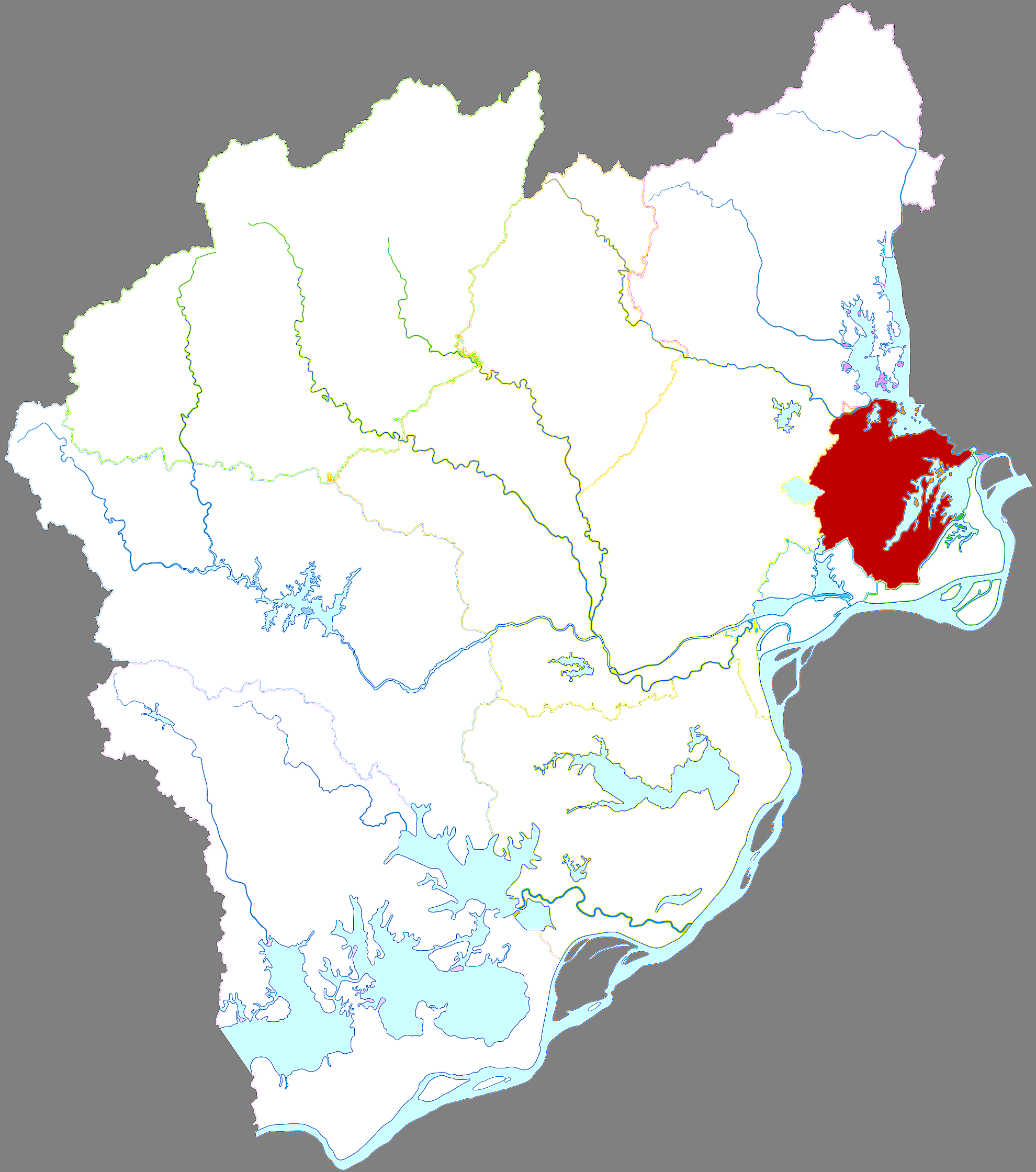
- Yixiu in Anqing

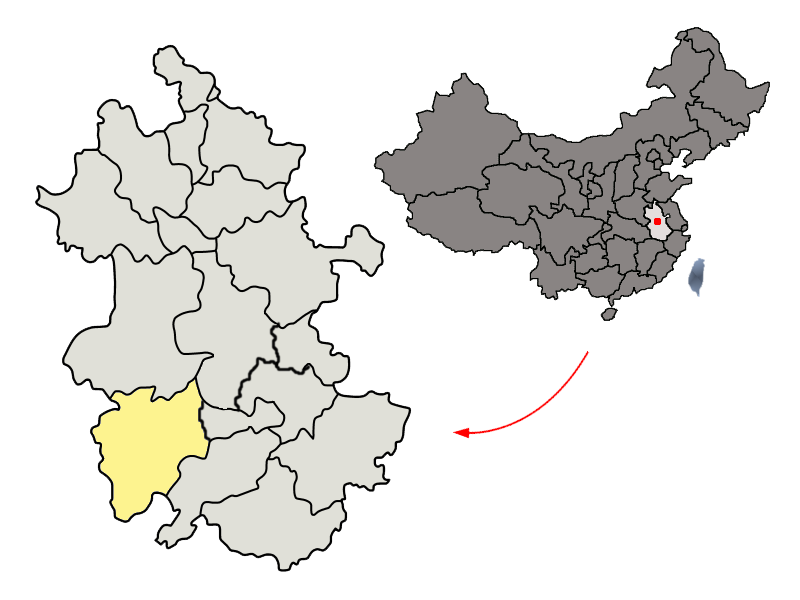
- Anqing in Anhui
- Coordinates: 30°32′28″N 117°04′12″E
- Country: China
- Province: Anhui
- Prefecture-level division: Anqing

Area
  - Total: 410.3 km^{2} (158.4 sq mi)

Population (2020)
  - Total: 196,672
  - Density: 479.3/km^{2} (1,241/sq mi)
- Time zone: UTC+8 (China Standard)
- Postal Code: 246003
- Website: http://yxiu.aqzy.gov.cn/

Yixiu District (simplified Chinese: 宜秀区; traditional Chinese: 宜秀區; pinyin: Yíxiù Qū) is a district of the city of Anqing, Anhui Province, China. It has a population of 216,000 and an area of 410.3 square kilometres (158.4 sq mi).

== Administrative divisions ==
Yixiu District has jurisdiction over 1 subdistrict, 3 towns and 2 townships.

Subdistricts

- Daqiao Subdistrict (大桥街道)

Towns

- Dalongshan (大龙山镇), Luoling (罗岭镇), Yangqiao (杨桥镇)

Townships

- Wuheng Township (五横乡), Baizehu Township (白泽湖乡)
