= Daguan District =

Daguan 大观区
- District
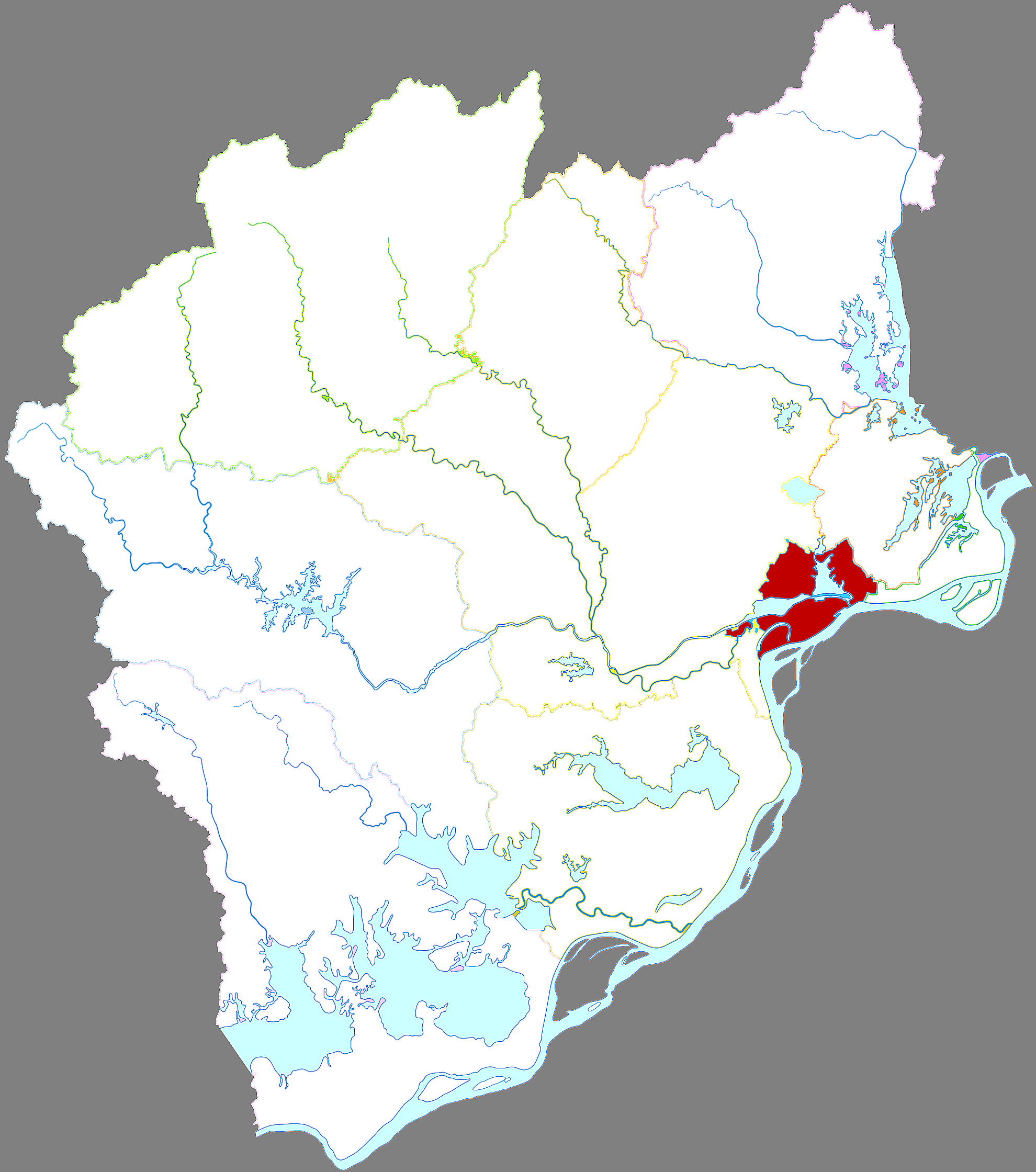
- Daguan in Anqing

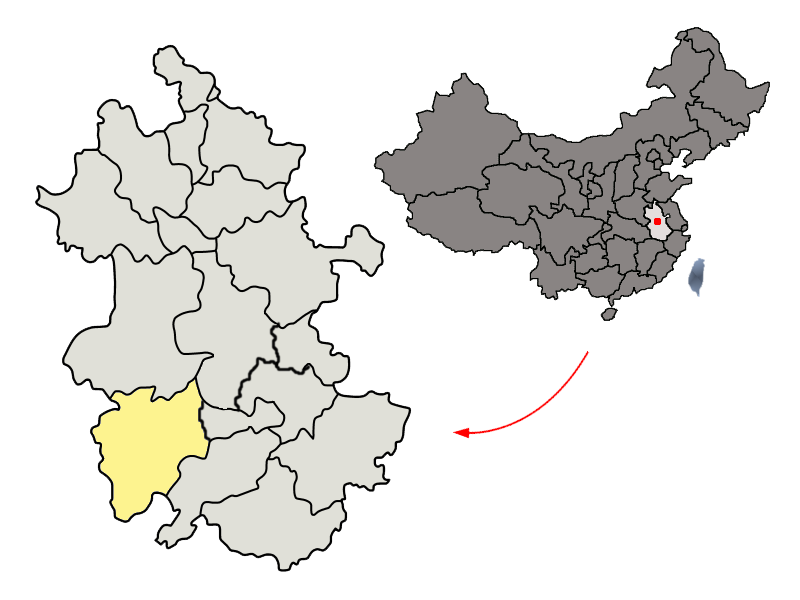
- Anqing in Anhui
- Coordinates (Daguan District government): 30°33′13″N 117°00′48″E
- Country: China
- Province: Anhui
- Prefecture-level city: Anqing

Area
  - Total: 203.9 km^{2} (78.7 sq mi)

Population (2020)
  - Total: 214,112
  - Density: 1,050/km^{2} (2,720/sq mi)
- Time zone: UTC+8 (China Standard)

Daguan District (simplified Chinese: 大观区; traditional Chinese: 大觀區; pinyin: Dàguān Qū) is an urban district of the city of Anqing, Anhui Province, China. It has a population of 267,000 (2005) and an area of 203.9 km^{2} (78.7 sq mi).

== Administrative divisions ==
Daguan District has jurisdiction over 7 subdistricts, 1 town and 2 townships.

subdistricts

- Yulin Road Subdistrict (玉琳路街道), Dekuan Road Subdistrict (德宽路街道), Longshan Road Subdistrict (龙山路街道), Jixuan Road Subdistrict (集贤路街道), Huaxiang Road Subdistrict (花亭路街道), Shihua Road Subdistrict (石化路街道), Linghu Subdistrict (菱湖街道)

town

- Haikou Town (海口镇)

townships

- Shilipu Township (十里铺乡)
- Shankou Township (山口乡)
