= Wangjiang County =

Wangjiang 望江县
- County
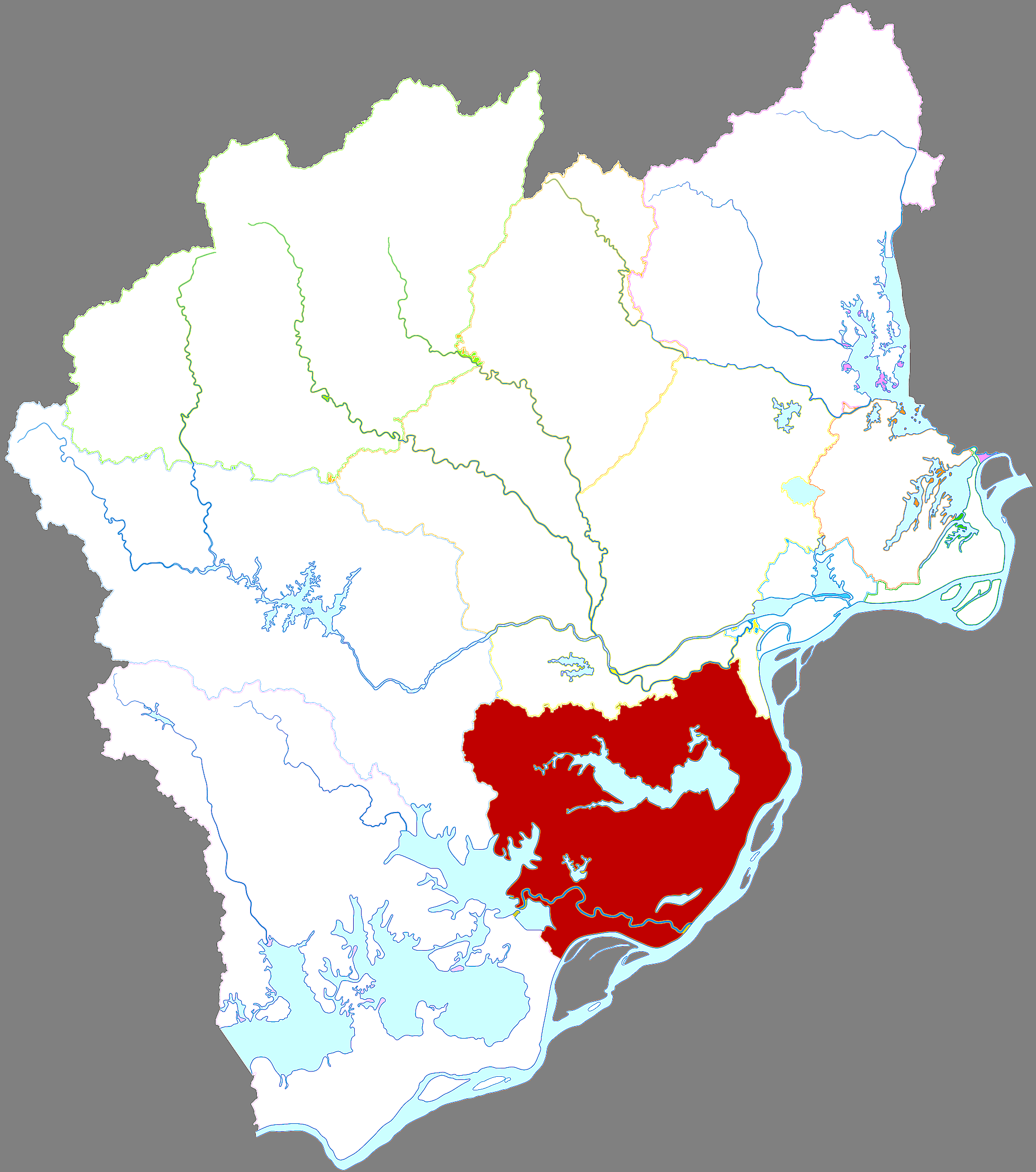
- Wangjiang in Anqing

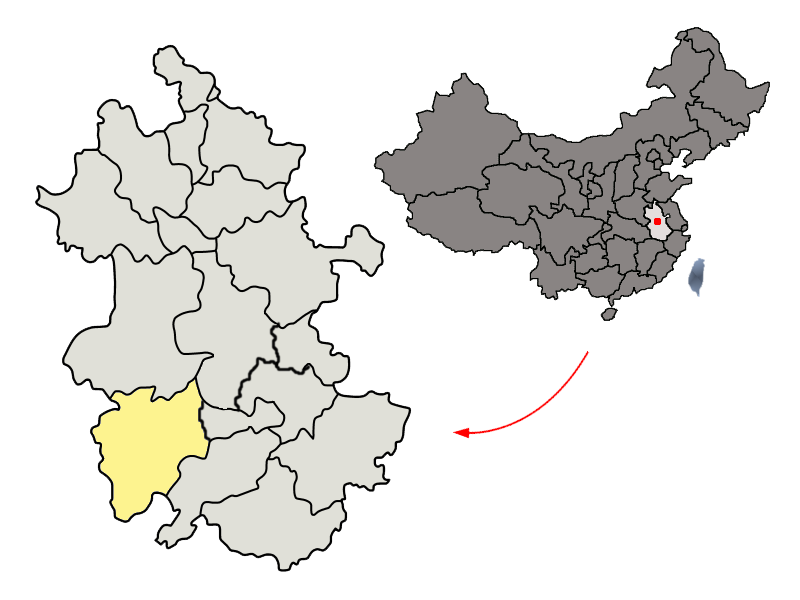
- Anqing in Anhui
- Coordinates: 30°07′28″N 116°41′39″E
- Country: China
- Province: Anhui
- Prefecture-level city: Anqing
- County seat: Huayang

Area
  - Total: 1,347.98 km^{2} (520.46 sq mi)

Population (2020)
  - Total: 462,367
  - Density: 343.007/km^{2} (888.385/sq mi)
- Time zone: UTC+8 (China Standard)
- Postal code: 246200

Wangjiang County (simplified Chinese: 望江县; traditional Chinese: 望江縣; pinyin: Wàng Jiāng Xiàn) is a county in the southwest of Anhui Province, situated on the northwest (left) bank of the Yangtze. It is under the jurisdiction of the prefecture-level city of Anqing. It has population of 600,000 and an area of 1,357 km^{2} (524 sq mi). The government of Wangjiang County is located in Huayang Town.

== Administrative divisions ==
Wangjiang County has jurisdiction over eight towns and two townships.

Towns

- Huayang (华阳镇), Saikou (赛口镇), Yatan (雅滩镇), Changling Town (长岭镇), Taici (太慈镇), Zhanghu (漳湖镇), Gaoshi (高士镇), Yangwan (杨湾镇)

Townships:

- Leichi Township (雷池乡), Liangquan Township (凉泉乡)

== Climate ==
Climate data for Wangjiang, elevation 60 m (200 ft), (1991–2020 normals, extremes 1991–present)
Month	Jan	Feb	Mar	Apr	May	Jun	Jul	Aug	Sep	Oct	Nov	Dec	Year
Record high °C (°F)	25.1 (77.2)	27.0 (80.6)	31.6 (88.9)	33.5 (92.3)	35.7 (96.3)	37.4 (99.3)	39.9 (103.8)	40.2 (104.4)	38.0 (100.4)	35.0 (95.0)	30.6 (87.1)	23.2 (73.8)	40.2 (104.4)
Mean daily maximum °C (°F)	7.9 (46.2)	10.9 (51.6)	15.5 (59.9)	21.9 (71.4)	26.8 (80.2)	29.4 (84.9)	32.8 (91.0)	32.3 (90.1)	28.4 (83.1)	23.2 (73.8)	17.1 (62.8)	10.5 (50.9)	21.4 (70.5)
Daily mean °C (°F)	4.3 (39.7)	6.8 (44.2)	11.2 (52.2)	17.3 (63.1)	22.3 (72.1)	25.5 (77.9)	28.9 (84.0)	28.2 (82.8)	24.1 (75.4)	18.6 (65.5)	12.4 (54.3)	6.4 (43.5)	17.2 (62.9)
Mean daily minimum °C (°F)	1.6 (34.9)	3.8 (38.8)	7.8 (46.0)	13.5 (56.3)	18.7 (65.7)	22.5 (72.5)	25.8 (78.4)	25.2 (77.4)	20.9 (69.6)	15.2 (59.4)	8.9 (48.0)	3.4 (38.1)	13.9 (57.1)
Record low °C (°F)	−7.3 (18.9)	−8.1 (17.4)	−3.3 (26.1)	2.1 (35.8)	9.1 (48.4)	16.5 (61.7)	17.2 (63.0)	17.3 (63.1)	13.1 (55.6)	4.7 (40.5)	−3.1 (26.4)	−12.2 (10.0)	−12.2 (10.0)
Average precipitation mm (inches)	66.9 (2.63)	81.4 (3.20)	128.1 (5.04)	153.0 (6.02)	188.2 (7.41)	247.8 (9.76)	210.0 (8.27)	128.6 (5.06)	66.0 (2.60)	53.0 (2.09)	62.1 (2.44)	43.0 (1.69)	1,428.1 (56.21)
Average precipitation days (≥ 0.1 mm)	11.7	11.5	14.7	13.8	13.0	14.2	10.9	10.4	7.5	7.6	9.4	8.7	133.4
Average snowy days	3.8	2.0	0.5	0	0	0	0	0	0	0	0.2	1.3	7.8
Average relative humidity (%)	78	78	78	76	77	82	79	81	80	76	77	75	78
Mean monthly sunshine hours	95.0	97.3	116.8	143.6	161.9	140.3	211.0	206.7	165.8	156.9	128.9	121.1	1,745.3
Percentage possible sunshine	29	31	31	37	38	33	49	51	45	45	41	38	39
Source: China Meteorological Administration
