= Zhenfeng Pagoda =

Buddhist pagoda in Anqing city, China

Coordinates: 30.503596°N 117.04926°E

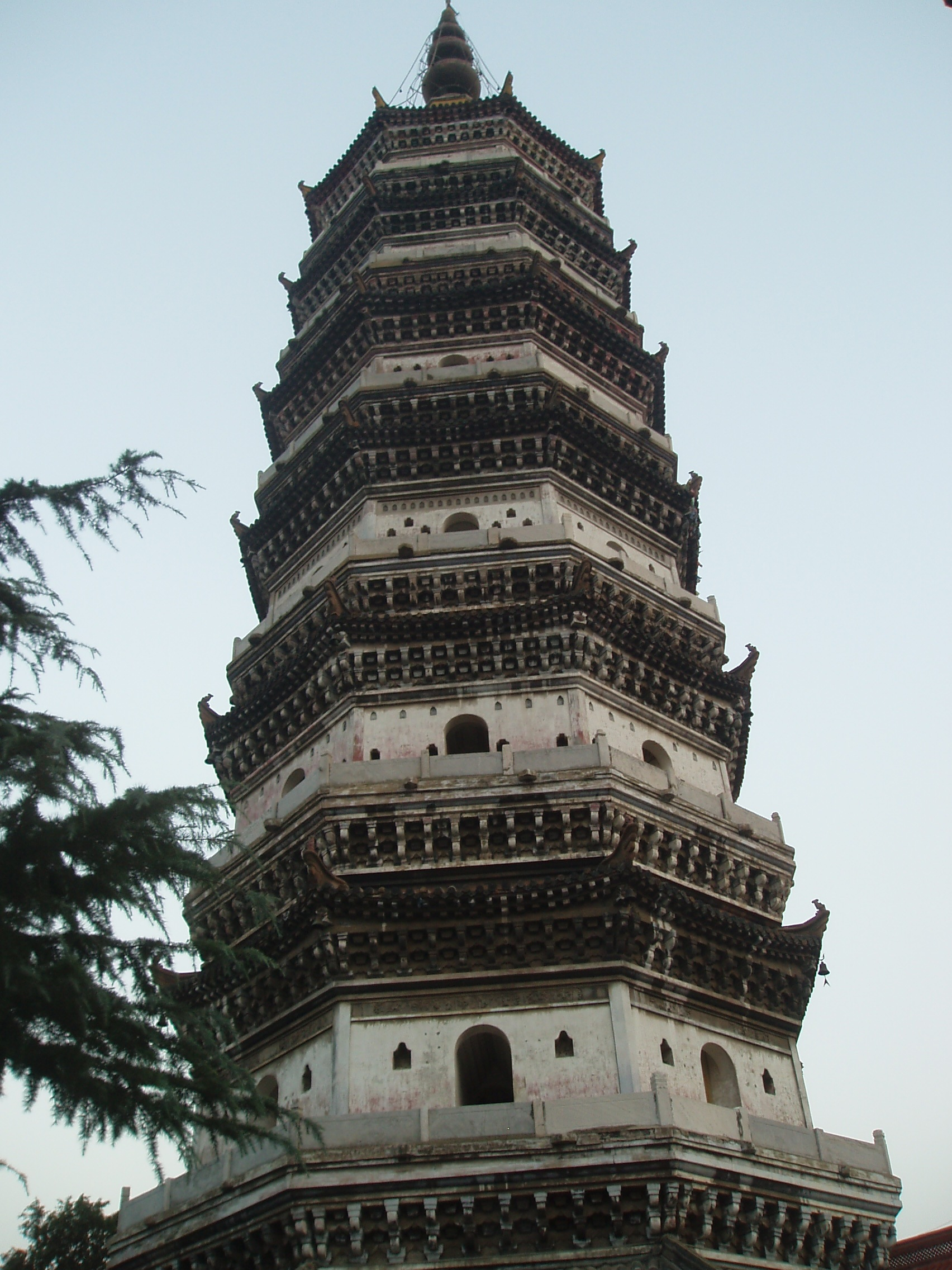
Zhenfeng Pagoda

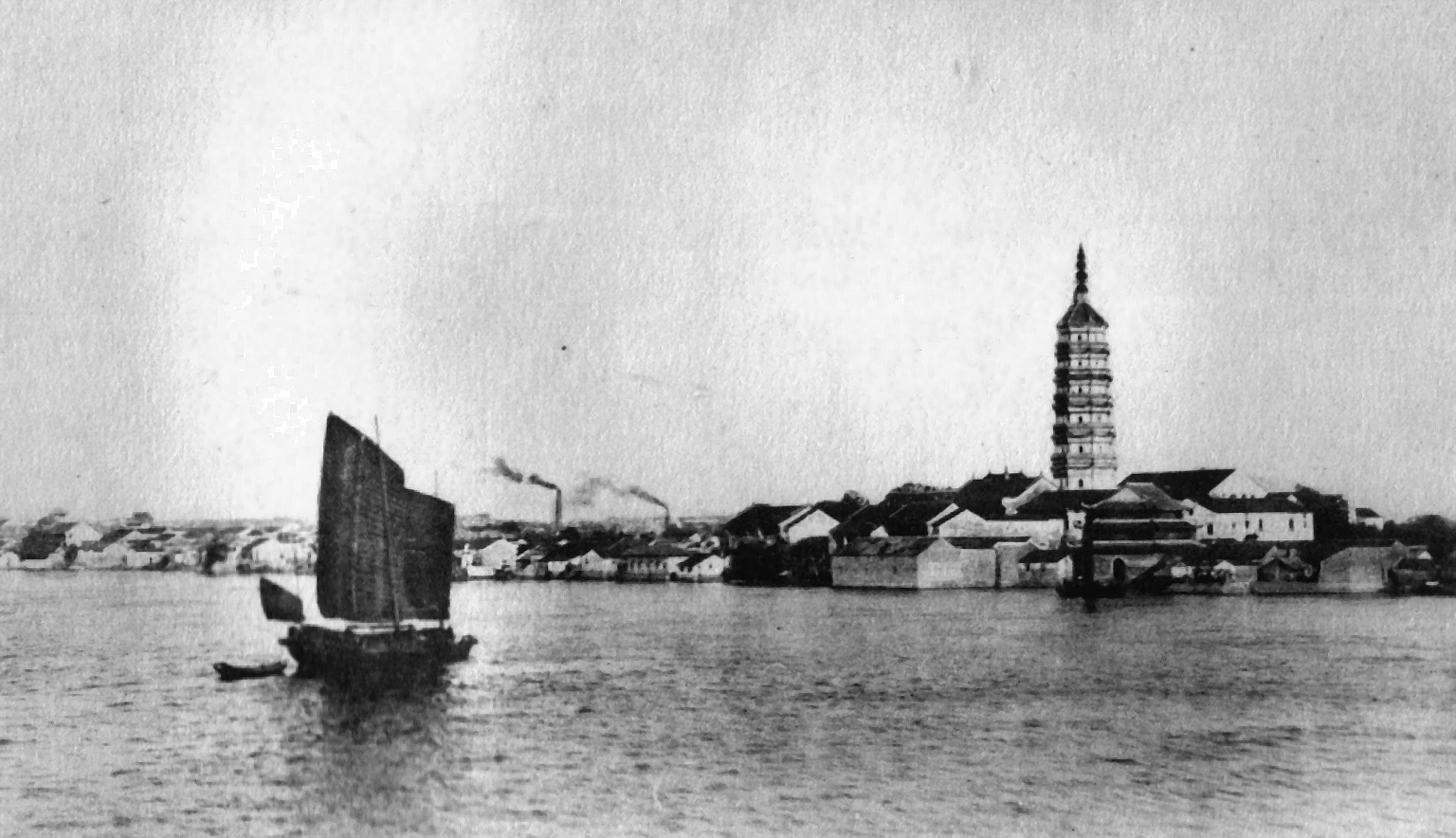
Zhenfeng pagoda from the river (pre-1929).

The Zhenfeng Pagoda (simplified Chinese: 振风塔; traditional Chinese: 振風塔; pinyin: Zhènfēng Tǎ) in Anqing City, Anhui Province, People's Republic of China, is a Buddhist pagoda originally built in 1570 during the late Ming Dynasty. Due to its location near a bend in the Yangtze River, the pagoda was formerly used as a lighthouse, and contains niches for lanterns. After construction, the pagoda was initially called the "Ten-thousand Buddha" (万佛塔) pagoda due to its interior containing over six hundred Buddha statues.

== Structure ==
Built of brick and 72 metres (236 ft) tall, each of the pagoda's seven stories has seven corners, thereby creating a heptagon. Above the windows on each floor are a set of flying eaves. From the first to the sixth floor, arched doorways lead to an outside balcony. A total of 168 stairs inside the pagoda allow access to the top floor. The walls are tapered slightly, shaping the structure into a partial cone.
