= Huaining County =

Huaining 怀宁县 Hwaining
- County
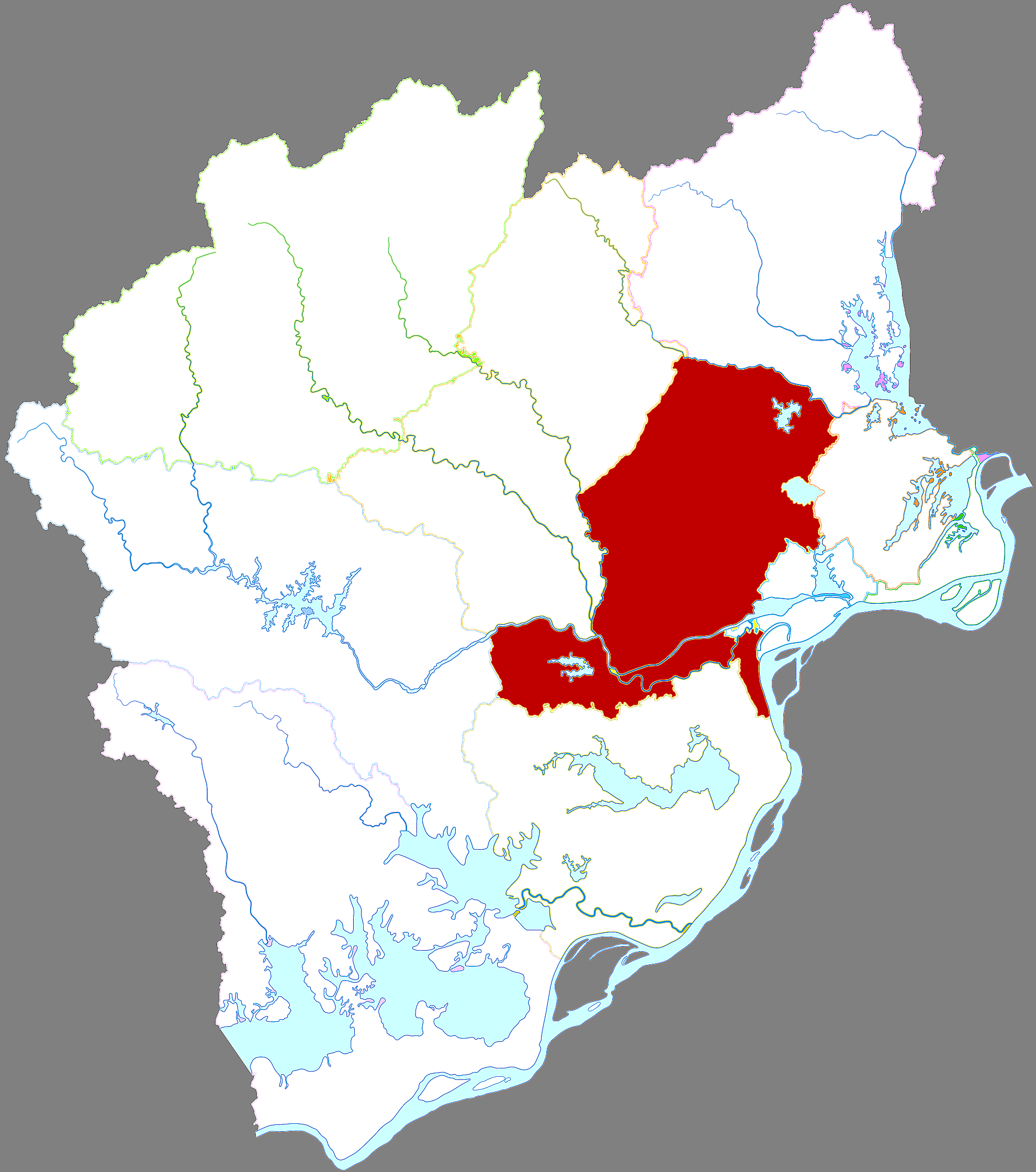
- Huaining in Anqing
- Coordinates: 30°44′05″N 116°49′47″E
- Country: China
- Province: Anhui
- Prefecture-level city: Anqing
- County seat: Gaohe

Area
  - Total: 1,276 km^{2} (493 sq mi)

Population (2020)
  - Total: 496,683
  - Density: 389.2/km^{2} (1,008/sq mi)
- Time zone: UTC+8 (China Standard)
- Postal code: 246121

Huaining County (simplified Chinese: 怀宁县; traditional Chinese: 懷寧縣; pinyin: Huáiníng Xiàn) is a county in the southwest Anhui Province, China, under the jurisdiction of the prefecture-level city of Anqing. It has a population of 790,000 and an area of 1,543 km^{2} (596 sq mi). The government of Huaining County was originally based in Shipai (Shihpai) (石牌镇) Town and moved to its current location in Gaohe Town (高河镇) on 18 January 2002.

== Administrative divisions ==
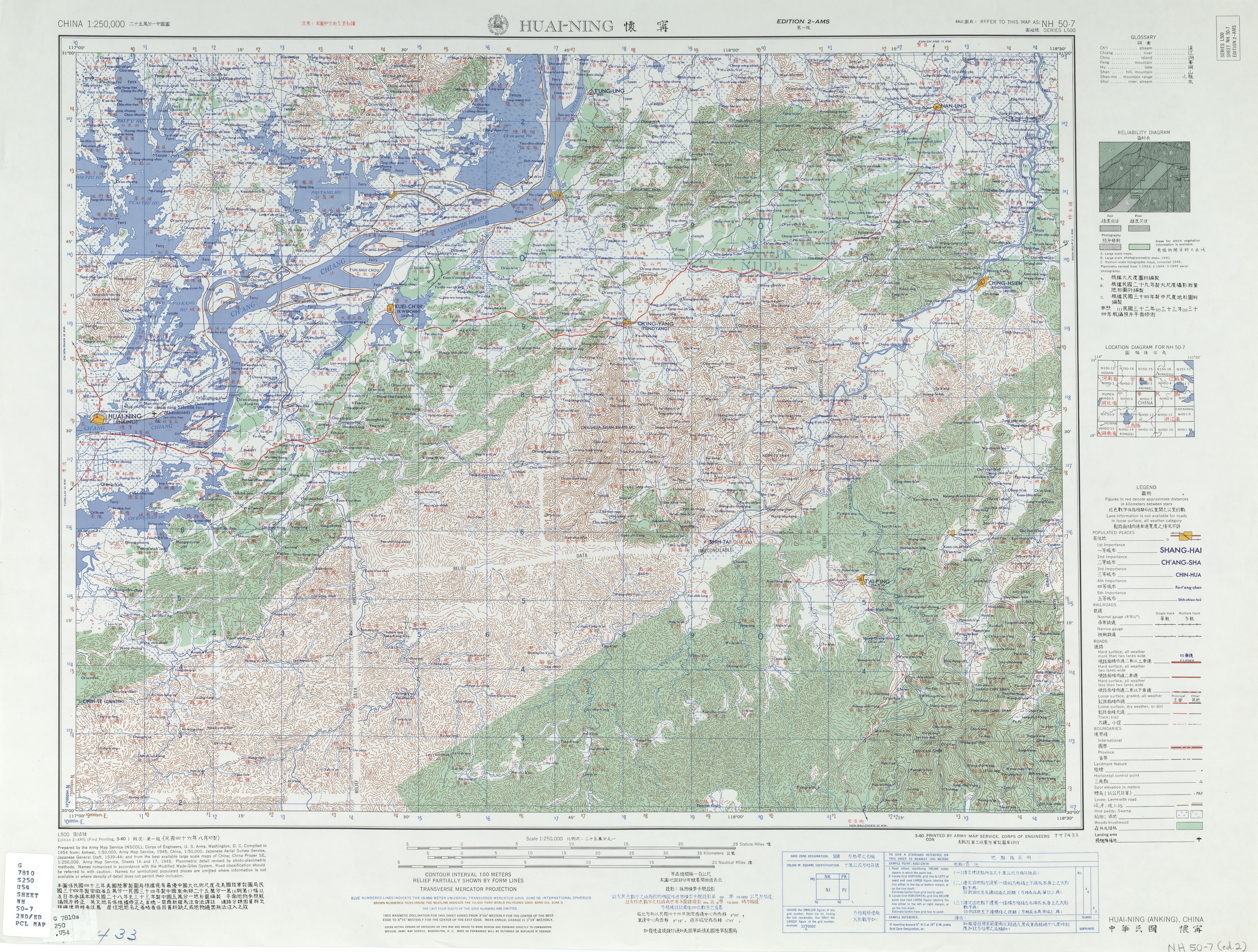
Map including Huaining (labeled as HUAI-NING (ANKING) 懷寧) (AMS, 1954)

Huaining County has jurisdiction over fifteen towns and five townships.

Towns

- Gaohe (高河镇), Shipai (Shihpai) (石牌镇), Yueshan (月山镇), Hongpu (洪铺镇), Chaling (茶岭镇), Jingong (金拱镇), Sanqiao (三桥镇), Huangdun (黄墩镇), Jiangzhen (江镇镇), Xiaoshi (小市镇), Lashu (腊树镇), Huanglong (黄龙镇), Songling (公岭镇), Pingshan (平山镇), Mamiao (马庙镇)

Townships:

- Liangxiang Township (凉亭乡), Xiushan Township (秀山乡), Qinghe Township (清河乡), Leibu Township (雷埠乡), Shijing Township (石镜乡)

== Climate ==
Climate data for Huaining, elevation 36 m (118 ft), (1991–2020 normals, extremes 1991–present)
Month	Jan	Feb	Mar	Apr	May	Jun	Jul	Aug	Sep	Oct	Nov	Dec	Year
Record high °C (°F)	23.8 (74.8)	26.7 (80.1)	30.7 (87.3)	32.7 (90.9)	35.7 (96.3)	37.7 (99.9)	39.7 (103.5)	39.6 (103.3)	36.2 (97.2)	34.7 (94.5)	29.1 (84.4)	21.9 (71.4)	39.7 (103.5)
Mean daily maximum °C (°F)	7.9 (46.2)	10.8 (51.4)	15.5 (59.9)	21.9 (71.4)	26.8 (80.2)	29.3 (84.7)	32.4 (90.3)	32.1 (89.8)	28.2 (82.8)	23.2 (73.8)	17.0 (62.6)	10.5 (50.9)	21.3 (70.3)
Daily mean °C (°F)	3.8 (38.8)	6.4 (43.5)	10.8 (51.4)	17.0 (62.6)	22.1 (71.8)	25.3 (77.5)	28.5 (83.3)	27.9 (82.2)	23.6 (74.5)	18.0 (64.4)	11.8 (53.2)	5.9 (42.6)	16.8 (62.2)
Mean daily minimum °C (°F)	0.8 (33.4)	3.0 (37.4)	7.2 (45.0)	13.0 (55.4)	18.3 (64.9)	22.1 (71.8)	25.3 (77.5)	24.7 (76.5)	20.2 (68.4)	14.2 (57.6)	8.0 (46.4)	2.5 (36.5)	13.3 (55.9)
Record low °C (°F)	−9.0 (15.8)	−7.4 (18.7)	−3.1 (26.4)	1.0 (33.8)	9.0 (48.2)	15.9 (60.6)	16.8 (62.2)	16.7 (62.1)	10.5 (50.9)	1.9 (35.4)	−3.4 (25.9)	−5.1 (22.8)	−9.0 (15.8)
Average precipitation mm (inches)	61.6 (2.43)	74.3 (2.93)	113.3 (4.46)	146.8 (5.78)	175.8 (6.92)	261.4 (10.29)	233.9 (9.21)	145.3 (5.72)	61.5 (2.42)	51.3 (2.02)	60.1 (2.37)	35.8 (1.41)	1,421.1 (55.96)
Average precipitation days (≥ 0.1 mm)	10.4	11.0	13.6	13.0	12.5	13.3	12.3	11.6	7.6	7.7	8.5	8.0	129.5
Average snowy days	4.5	2.3	0.9	0	0	0	0	0	0	0	0.3	1.6	9.6
Average relative humidity (%)	77	77	76	75	76	82	81	81	79	76	77	74	78
Mean monthly sunshine hours	103.7	104.1	126.5	156.7	171.8	148.2	200.1	201.8	169.6	160.8	141.2	129.4	1,813.9
Percentage possible sunshine	32	33	34	40	40	35	47	50	46	46	45	41	41
Source: China Meteorological Administration

== Transport ==
- China National Highway 318

== Culture ==
Huaining County is noted as the birthplace of Huangmei opera.

== Notable people ==
- Deng Jiaxian (1924–1986) developer of the first Chinese atomic bomb and guided missile.
- Hai Zi (1964–1989) well-known poet.
- Chen Duxiu (1879–1942) a Chinese revolutionary socialist, educator, philosopher, author, and co-founded the Chinese Communist Party.
