= Expressways of Shanghai =

List of expressways geographically in Shanghai, China

Map of Expressways in Shanghai

Shanghai has an expansive grade-separated highway and expressway network consisting of 16 municipal express roads, 10 provincial-level expressways, and 8 national-level expressways. Three municipal expressways and four provincial-level expressways are also under construction.

== Municipal express roads ==
Most municipal express roads are found in the inner districts of Shanghai, including several elevated highways which run directly above surface-level roadways. In Chinese, these expressways are literally termed city high-speed roadways (Chinese: 城市快速道路), and their maximum speed is typically 80 kilometres per hour (50 mph). These are still considered expressways or controlled-access highways because of the presence of ramps, grade-separated junctions, and the absence of traffic lights. Most of these expressways are elevated and run above a lower-speed roadway. The Inner Ring Road is a beltway, while the Middle Ring Road, is also a beltway.

=== Primary express roads ===
These are primary express roads that form a major backbone of expressways within the city core. Of these four, the Inner Ring, North–South, and Yan'an Elevated Roads form a 申 (a Chinese abbreviation for Shanghai) shape. The Middle Ring forms a second orbital surrounding the Inner Ring Elevated Road, and is fully complete. The 申 shape was originally partial until the recent completion of the Pudong Avenue Ground Way.

English name	Chinese characters name	Termini	Notes
Inner Ring Road; Also known as Inner Ring Elevated Road	上海内环线 内环高架路	Ring road	47.7 kilometres (29.6 mi) long. Crosses the Huangpu River using the Yangpu Bridge and Nanpu Bridge.
Middle Ring Road	中环路	Ring road	70 kilometres (43 mi) long. Crosses the Huangpu River using the Jungong Road Tunnel and Shangzhong Road Tunnel.
North–South Elevated Road	南北高架路 (lit. South–North Elevated Road)	Pujiang Town; Shanghai S20	18.1 kilometres (11.2 mi) long.
Yan'an Elevated Road	延安高架路	Hongqiao International Airport; The Bund, Bund Tunnel, East Zhongshan No. 1 Road	15 kilometres (9.3 mi) long.

=== Auxiliary express roads ===
These are other express roads that serve as part of the municipal expressway network. Of these, six belong to the Hongqiao Comprehensive Transportation Hub, a network of municipal expressways serving Shanghai Hongqiao Railway Station and Shanghai Hongqiao International Airport.

English name	Chinese characters name	Termini	Notes
Beidi Elevated Road	北翟高架路	Jiamin Elevated Road; Middle Ring Road	7.3 kilometres (4.5 mi) long. Part of the Hongqiao Comprehensive Transportation Hub.
Beiheng Passageway	北横通道	Middle Ring Road & Beidi Elevated Road junction Haining Road & North Zhejiang Road	Eastern underground section under construction, to be extended to Yangpu District
Bund Tunnel	外滩隧道		Speed limit of 40 kilometres per hour (25 mph).
Dujiaqu Elevated Road	度假区高架路	Middle Ring Road, Disney Shanghai	Formerly known as Shenjiang Elevated Road.
Hongdi Elevated Road	虹翟高架路		Part of the Hongqiao Comprehensive Transportation Hub.
Hongmei Elevated Road	虹梅高架路	Middle Ring Road at West Shangzhong Road; South Hongmei Road Tunnel	10.4 kilometres (6.5 mi) long.
Hongyu Elevated Road	虹渝高架路	G50	Part of the Hongqiao Comprehensive Transportation Hub.
Huaxia Elevated Road	华夏高架路	Middle Ring Road at Shenjiang Road; S1 Yingbin Expressway near Pudong International Airport	15.6 kilometres (9.7 mi) long.
Humin Elevated Road	沪闵高架路	Inner Ring Road; G60 / Shanghai S4 / Shanghai S20	13.32 kilometres (8.28 mi) long.
Husong Elevated Road	沪松高架		In planning.
Jiamin Elevated Road	嘉闵高架路	Shanghai S6, Shanghai S32	Part of the Hongqiao Comprehensive Transportation Hub.
Jianhong Elevated Road	建虹高架路		Part of the Hongqiao Comprehensive Transportation Hub.
Luoshan Elevated Road	罗山高架路		Inner Ring Road at Luoshan Road/Longyang Road/Longdong Avenue, Shanghai S20
Songze Elevated Road	崧泽高架路	G15; Jiamin Elevated Road	Part of the Hongqiao Comprehensive Transportation Hub.
Wuzhou Avenue	五洲大道	Xiangyin Road Tunnel; G1503 / Shanghai S20	7.0 kilometres (4.3 mi) long.
Yixian Elevated Road	逸仙高架路	Inner Ring Road; G1503	9.5 kilometres (5.9 mi) long.
Caobao Elevated Road	漕宝高架路		Part of the Hongqiao Comprehensive Transportation Hub. Under planning.
Longdong Elevated Road	龙东高架路	Inner Ring Road at Luoshan Road/Longyang Road/Longdong Avenue, G1503	

=== Restrictions on driving ===
In Shanghai, there are restrictions on foreign license plates, temporary license plates, drivers with probationary licenses, and taxis not carrying passengers to drive on many municipal elevated roads. This ban is enforced by the police, and affects every day except Saturday, Sunday, and public holidays. They came into effect on November 2020.

The affected expressways include:

==== 1. Municipal freeways, from 7:00 to 20:00 daily ====
1. Yan'an Elevated Road (entire route)
2. North-South Elevated Road (400m section south of Huma Road and Luheng Road, including Lupu Bridge)
3. Yixian Elevated Road (entire route)
4. Shanghai-Minhang Elevated Road (entire route)
5. Middle Ring Road (entire route)
6. Huaxia Elevated Road (entire route)
7. Luoshan Elevated (entire route)
8. Dujia Elevated Road (from Middle Ring Road to Xiupu Road)
9. Inner Ring Elevated Road (including Nanpu Bridge, except the section from the inner ring Zhongshan North 2nd Road entrance to the Jinxiu Road exit and the outer ring Jinxiu Road entrance to the Huangxing Road exit)
10. Longdong Elevated Road (from Luoshan Road Interchange to S20 Outer Ring Expressway)
11. Hongmei Elevated Road (from Middle Ring Road to S20 Outer Ring Expressway)
12. Beidi Road Tunnel
13. Yan'an East Tunnel
14. Beiheng Passageway (from Beihong Interchange to Tianmu Interchange and the grounding point at Wen'an Road).

==== 2. Inner Ring, 7:00 to 9:00 and 17:00 to 19:00 ====
Furthermore, there is a prohibition affecting the same categories, within any point inside the Inner Ring Elevated Road and the roads it is with.

== Provincial expressways ==
Designations for provincial-level and federal-level expressways in Shanghai had the letter prefix A before the number of the expressway. Starting at the Yingbin Expressway, which was designated the number 1, the numbers increased clockwise around the city. For ring expressways, the designations A20, A30, A40, etc., were used. For expressways connecting to other provinces which already had national designations (beginning with the letter G), designations with the letter A were attached.

In August 2009, Shanghai replaced its system of naming expressways with the prefix A with the letter prefix S, in order to conform to the standard designations for provincial-level highways within China. The S means Shengdao, or provincial-level roads. The letter prefix A was abolished.

Signpost	Designation	Former designation	English name	Chinese characters name	Termini	Notes
	S1	A1	Yingbin Expressway	迎宾高速公路	Shanghai S2 / Shanghai S20 in Pudong New Area; Shanghai S32 at Pudong International Airport	18.5 kilometres (11.5 mi) long.
	S2	A2	Shanghai–Luchaogang Expressway	沪芦高速公路	Shanghai S1 / Shanghai S20 in Pudong New Area; Yangshan Port, Zhoushan, Zhejiang	74.8 kilometres (46.5 mi) long including the Donghai Bridge.
	S3	A3	Shanghai–Fengxian Expressway	沪奉高速公路	Shanghai S20; Zhoudeng Highway	Extension to Fengxian District has been finished recently.
	S4	A4	Shanghai–Jinshan Expressway	沪金高速公路	G60 / G92 / Shanghai S20 / Humin Elevated Road in Minhang District; G15 in Jinshan District	
	S5	A12	Shanghai–Jiading Expressway	沪嘉高速公路	Middle Ring Road; Yecheng Road / South Bo'le Road in Jiading District	20.5 kilometres (12.7 mi) long.
	S6	A17	Shanghai–Nanxiang Expressway	沪翔高速公路	G15 in Jiading District; Shanghai S20 in Baoshan District	9.4 kilometres (5.8 mi) long.
	S7	A13	Shanghai–Chongming Expressway	沪崇高速公路		In planning, partly under construction.
	S12	Never assigned	Chongming–Haimen Expressway	崇海高速公路		In planning.
	S16	Never assigned	Shanghai–Yixing Expressway	沪宜高速公路		In planning.
	S19	A6	Xinnong–Jinshanwei Expressway	新卫高速公路	G1503 / Shanghai S36 in Xinnong, Jinshan District; Shanghai S301 (Xinwei Highway) in Jinshanwei, Jinshan District	
	S20	A20	Outer Ring Expressway	外环高速公路	Ring road	99 kilometres (62 mi) long. Crosses the Huangpu River twice, using the Xupu Bridge to the south and the Outer Ring Tunnel to the north. It is the third in a series of four ring roads around the city of Shanghai.
	S22	Never assigned	Jiading–Anting Expressway	嘉安高速公路		In planning.
	S26	A16	Shanghai–Changzhou Expressway	沪常高速公路	G15 in Qingpu District; Continues as Jiangsu S58 at the Jiangsu border	
	S32	A15	Shanghai–Jiaxing–Huzhou Expressway	申嘉湖高速公路	Shanghai S1 at Pudong International Airport; Continues as Zhejiang S12 at the Zhejiang border	
	S36	A7	Tinglin–Fengjing Expressway	亭枫高速公路	G1501 / Shanghai S19 in Jinshan District; G60 in Jiashan County, Jiaxing, Zhejiang, just outside Fengjing, Jinshan District	

== National expressways ==
National highways and expressways in Shanghai both have the prefix G, an abbreviation for Guodao (国道), which literally means National roads. Both grade-separated, controlled-access expressways and normal at-grade highways both have the prefix G. Only the national-level expressways are mentioned here. National-highways which are at grade and not controlled-access are also found in Shanghai, and these include G204, G312, G318, and G320. Expressways also have green-coloured signs while their highway counterparts have red-coloured signs.

Designation	Former Shanghai A designation	English name	Chinese characters name	Termini in Shanghai	Continues towards	Notes
	A11	Beijing–Shanghai Expressway	京沪高速公路	Middle Ring Road; Jiangsu border	Beijing	G2 Beijing–Shanghai Expressway and G42 Shanghai–Chengdu Expressway are concurrencies for their entire length in Shanghai.
	A11	Shanghai–Chengdu Expressway	沪蓉高速公路	Middle Ring Road; Jiangsu border	Chengdu	G2 Beijing–Shanghai Expressway and G42 Shanghai–Chengdu Expressway are concurrencies for their entire length in Shanghai.
	A4, A5	Shenyang–Haikou Expressway	沈海高速公路	Jiangsu border Zhejiang border	Shenyang (north); Haikou (south)	
	A14	Shanghai–Xi'an Expressway	沪陕高速公路	G1501 (Shanghai Ring Expressway); Jiangsu border	Xi'an	
	A9	Shanghai–Chongqing Expressway	沪渝高速公路	S20 Outer Ring Expressway and Yan'an Elevated Road; Jiangsu border	Chongqing	
	A8	Shanghai–Kunming Expressway	沪昆高速公路	S20 Outer Ring Expressway, S4 Shanghai–Jinshan Expressway, and Humin Elevated Road; Zhejiang border	Kunming	G60 Shanghai–Kunming Expressway and G92 Hangzhou Bay Ring Expressway are concurrencies from Dagang Interchange of G1503 Shanghai Ring Expressway to Zhejiang border.
	A8	G92 Hangzhou Bay Ring Expressway	杭州湾环线高速公路	G1503 Shanghai Ring Expressway; Zhejiang border	Ningbo	G60 Shanghai–Kunming Expressway and G92 Hangzhou Bay Ring Expressway are concurrencies from Dagang Interchange of G1503 Shanghai Ring Expressway to Zhejiang border.
	A30	Shanghai Ring Expressway	上海绕城高速公路	Ring road almost entirely within Shanghai. (Note: The G1503/G2/G42 Huaqiao Interchange is located in Kunshan, Jiangsu, but is managed by Shanghai authorities.)	Ring road	
	Never assigned	Shanghai–Wuhan Expressway	沪武高速公路		Alternate road	

== Yangtze River fixed crossing ==
Shanghai has one bridge-tunnel crossing spanning the Yangtze Delta to the north of the city. The G40 Shanghai–Xi'an Expressway follows the Shanghai Yangtze River Tunnel from Pudong to Changxing Island, and then over the Shanghai Yangtze River Bridge from Changxing to Chongming Island and finally via the Chongming–Qidong Yangtze River Bridge from Chongming to Qidong in Jiangsu Province on the north bank of the river. A second fixed crossing is planned to the west of this bridge, and will become part of the S7 Shanghai–Chongming Expressway.
