= Lupu Bridge =

Lupu Bridge 卢浦大桥
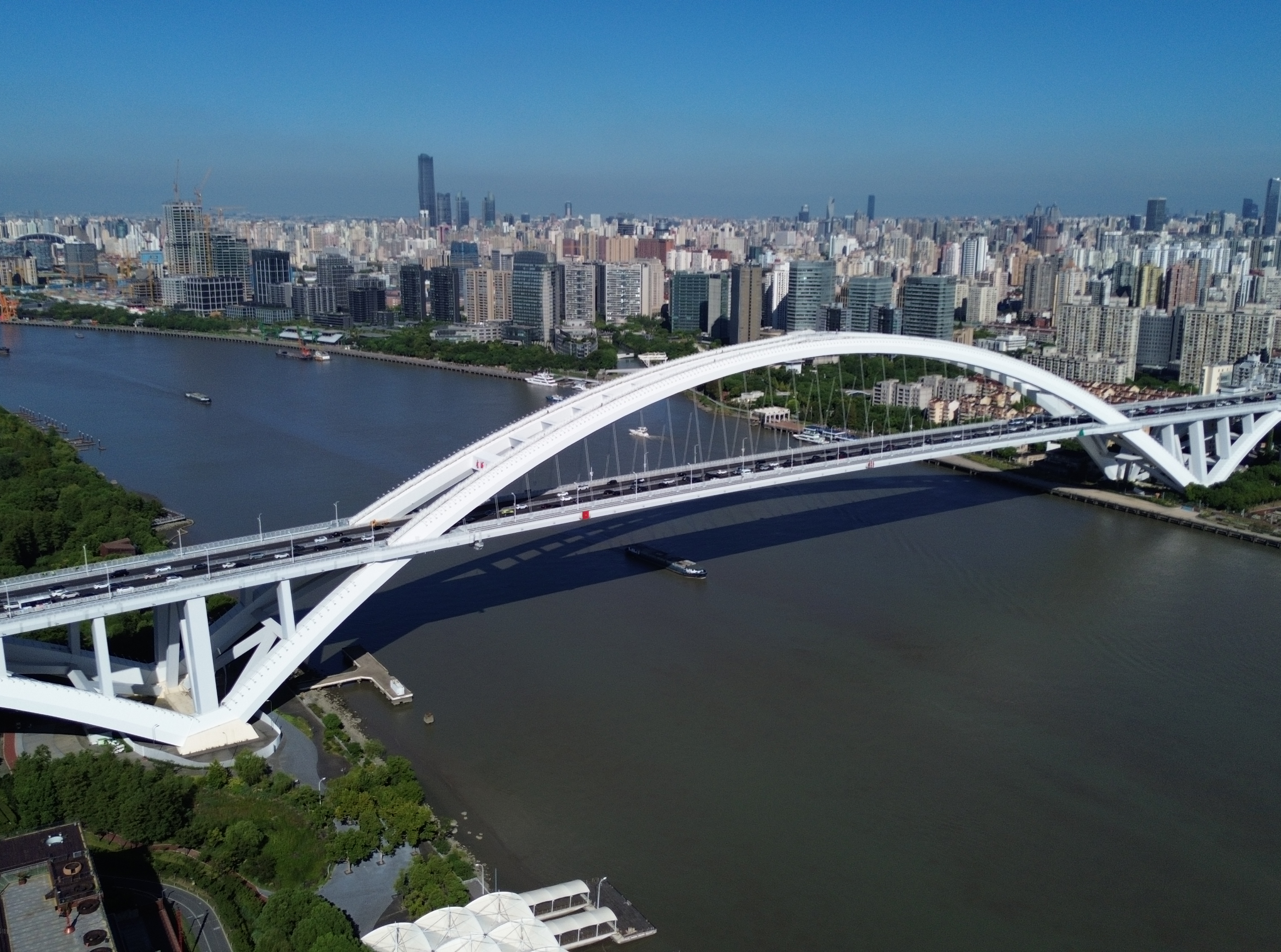
- Coordinates: 31.1914°N 121.4764°E
- Carries: 6 lanes of North–South Elevated Road, 2 pedestrian walkways
- Crosses: Huangpu River
- Locale: Shanghai, China
- Owner: Shanghai Lupu Bridge Investment Development Co., Ltd.
- Preceded by: Xupu Bridge
- Followed by: Nanpu Bridge

Characteristics
- Design: Through arch
- Material: Steel
- Total length: 3,900 m (12,795 ft)
- Width: 28.7 m (94 ft)
- Height: 100 m (328 ft)
- Longest span: 550 m (1,804 ft)
- Clearance below: 46 m (151 ft)

History
- Designer: Shanghai Municipal Engineering Design Institute
- Constructed by: Shanghai Foundation Engineering Company of Shanghai Construction Group
- Construction start: October 2000
- Construction cost: CN¥ 2.5 billion (US$302 million)
- Opened: June 28, 2003
- Inaugurated: June 27, 2003

Location
- Interactive map of Lupu Bridge

The Lupu Bridge (simplified Chinese: 卢浦大桥; traditional Chinese: 盧浦大橋; pinyin: Lúpǔ Dàqiáo), named after Luwan District, is a through arch bridge over the Huangpu River in Shanghai, China, connecting the city's Huangpu and Pudong districts. It is the world's third longest steel arch bridge, after the Ping'nan Third Bridge in Guangxi and the Chaotianmen Bridge in Chongqing. The bridge has a total length including approach spans of 3,900 m (12,795 ft) and opened on June 28, 2003. The main bridge structure is 750m long including the two side spans of 100m each, and the main span of 550 metres (1,804 ft) over the Huangpu River is 32 metres (105 ft) longer than the previous record holder for the longest arch bridge, the New River Gorge Bridge in Fayetteville, West Virginia. It cost 2.5 billion yuan (US$302 million), including US$78.04 for the main steel structure alone. It is located adjacent to the former Expo 2010 site and served as the centrepiece of the world exposition in Shanghai.

== Name ==
The name of the bridge, Lupu, is an abbreviation of the two districts of Shanghai which it links, one of which is now defunct. The north bank of the river administered by Luwan District until 2011, when it was merged into Huangpu District. However, the bridge still retains the name of the old district. The south bank of the river is administered by Pudong New Area. This follows the naming convention of the three earlier bridges across the Huangpu River, namely the Nanpu (Nanshi-Pudong), Yangpu (Yangpu-Pudong), and Xupu (Xuhui-Pudong) Bridges.

== History ==
The bridge was envisioned to ease congestion between the quickly developing areas in southern Puxi, as well as to help cope with the traffic expected for Expo 2010. The Expo 2010 site was just to the east of the Lupu Bridge on the Puxi side, and on both sides of the bridge on the Pudong side.

Construction began in October 2000 using a cantilever method and temporary cable-stays. Over 35,000 tonnes of steel were used in construction. The bridge's arch was joined on October 7, 2002.

When the bridge was completed, it became the world's longest arch bridge, surpassing the earlier title holder, the New River Gorge Bridge in Fayetteville, West Virginia. An inauguration ceremony was held on June 27, 2003, featuring a group of runners, including Yao Ming, who were the first to cross the bridge. The bridge opened to vehicular traffic the next day.

In 2009, Lupu Bridge lost its title of the world's longest arch bridge to the Chaotianmen Bridge in Chongqing. The longest span of the Chaotianmen Bridge was only 2 metres (7 ft) longer, at 552 metres (1,811 ft).

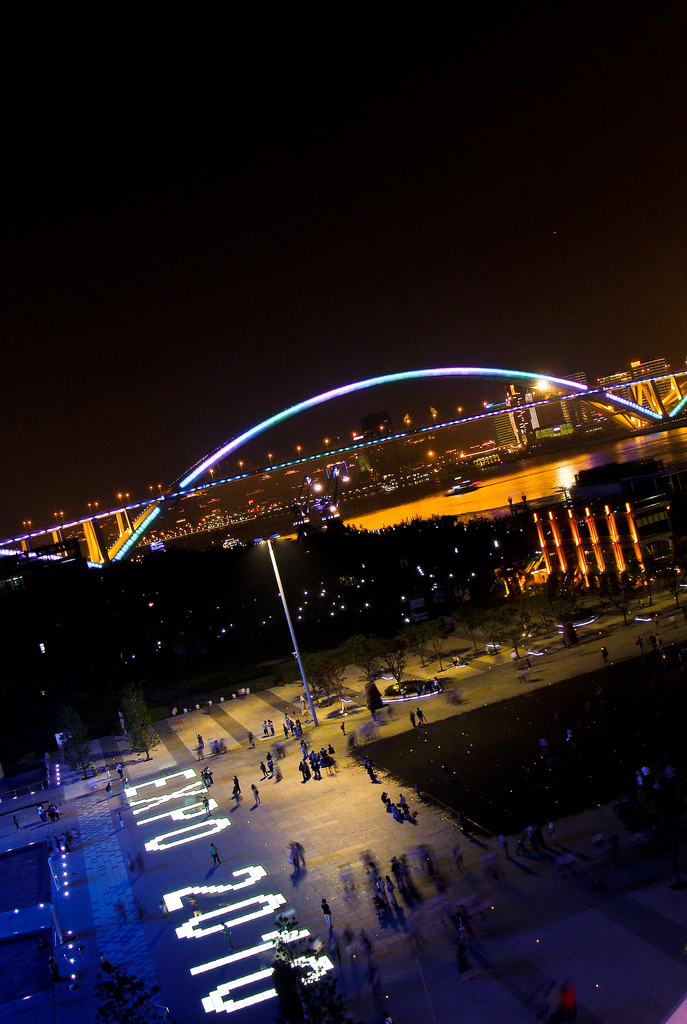
Lupu Bridge at night as seen from the Mercedes-Benz Arena during Expo 2010.

The Lupu Bridge was one of the architectural centerpieces of Expo 2010 in Shanghai, as it formed part of the western boundary of the Expo site.

== Road connections ==
The bridge carries 6 lanes of the North–South Elevated Road, a major elevated roadway in the city, with 3 lanes in each direction. From Pudong, motorists can access the Lupu Bridge from on-ramps to the North–South Elevated Road westbound on Yaohua Road or northbound on Jiyang Road. The North–South Elevated Road actually ends immediately after the Lupu Bridge and becomes Jiyang Road, with an off-ramp to eastbound Yaohua Road.

On the Puxi side immediately north of the bridge, the North–South Elevated Road intersects with the Inner Ring Road, another major elevated highway in Shanghai, forming the Luban Road Interchange, a roundabout interchange.

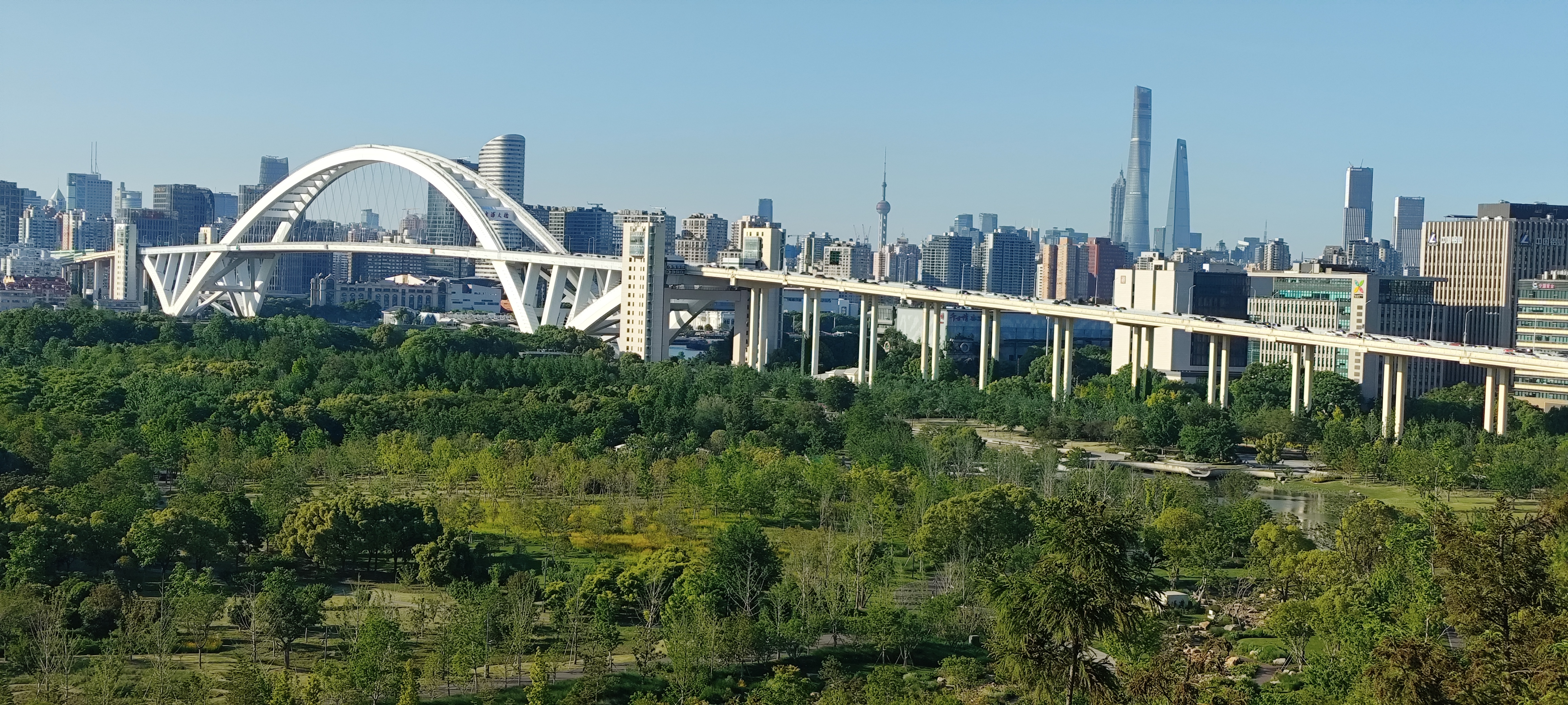
View of Shanghai with Lupu Bridge in foreground from Shanghai Expo Park

== Criticism ==
The construction of an arch bridge was viewed as wasteful in respect to the extra costs associated with building this type of bridge. Other designs which were less expensive in nature were rejected in favour of the more expensive tied arch design. Lupu Bridge became the first arch bridge across the Huangpu River in Shanghai and many feel its design is just a show piece for the city.

But the bridge's proponents argued that all the other bridges crossing the Huangpu were all cable-stayed bridges and having Lupu built as an arch bridge would make for variation of bridge types in the Shanghai landscape.

== Tourist attraction ==
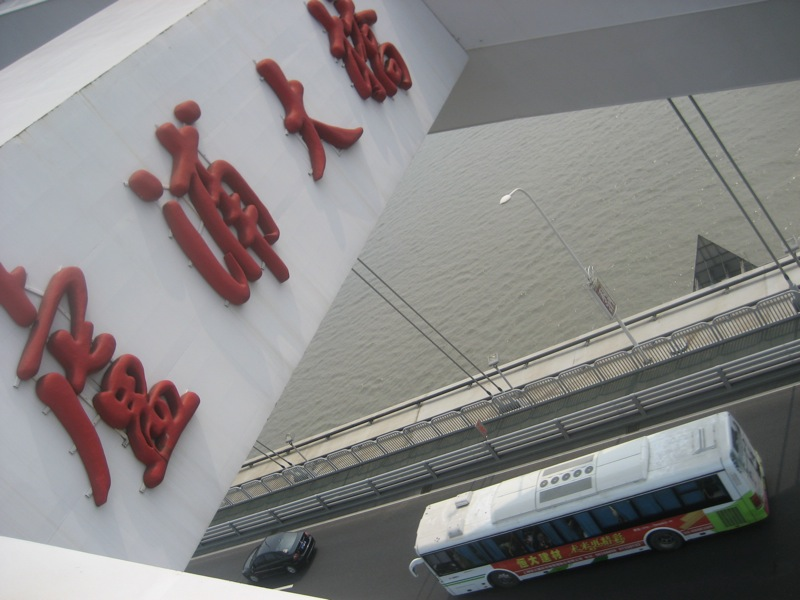
Tourists can climb to the top of the arch and view the bridge from above, as shown in this picture.

The Lupu Bridge used to be a popular tourist attraction along the Huangpu River. The bridge itself was actually also an attraction, as tourists could ascend to the observation deck at the top of the bridge. The attraction was known as Shanghai Climb, and involved riding a high-speed elevator from the base of the bridge, and then climbing 367 steps at high altitude along the arch of the bridge to the top. The attraction entrance was located on Luban Road, at the base of the Puxi side of the bridge. The observation area provides great views of Shanghai and the Expo 2010 site during the Expo. Currently (as of 03.05.2016) the bridge is closed for sightseeing.

The closest subway station currently in operation to the base of the bridge for the tourist attraction is the Luban Road Station on Line 4 of the Shanghai Metro. Lupu Bridge Station on Line 13, Shanghai Metro is actually named after the bridge itself, however it was a temporary station used during Expo 2010 and is currently not in operation.

== Awards ==
The Lupu Arch Bridge, Shanghai, China, received the 2008 IABSE Outstanding Structure Award for being "A soaring box-arch bridge with a record span, clean impressive lines and innovative use of the side spans of the arch and the deck to resist the thrust of the main arch."
