= North–South Elevated Road (Shanghai) =

Elevated expressway in China

North-South Elevated Road
- 南北高架路

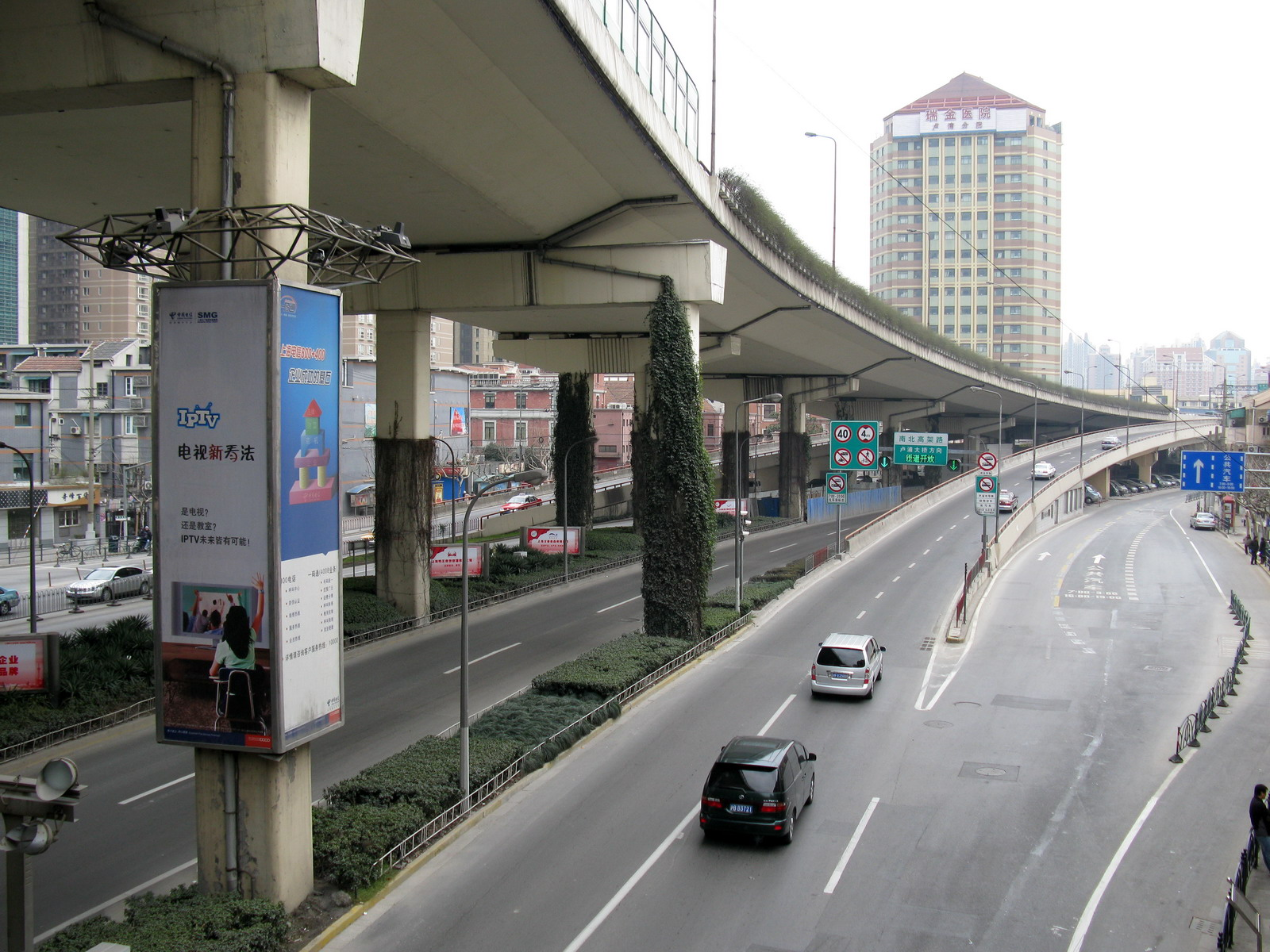
- The North-South Elevated Road runs above South Chongqing Road in this photo, with a northbound entrance ramp shown.

Route information
- Length: 18.1 km (11.2 mi)

Major junctions
- South end: Jiyang Road in Pudong New Area
- Inner Ring Road in Huangpu District; Yan'an Elevated Road in Huangpu District; Inner Ring Road in Zhabei District; Middle Ring Road in Zhabei District
- North end: Shanghai S20 / Shanghai S127 (Wenchuan Highway) in Baoshan District

Location
- Country: China
- Province: Shanghai

Highway system
- Transport in China

The North–South Elevated Road (Chinese: 南北高架路; pinyin: Nánběi Gāojiàlù; lit. 'South–North Elevated Road') is an elevated expressway in the city of Shanghai.

== Route ==
It begins to the south at Jiyang Road in Pudong New Area, crosses the Huangpu River into Puxi using the Lupu Bridge, and then traverses through Puxi to the Outer Ring Expressway in Baoshan District.

== Construction ==
Construction on the first phase of the expressway, from the Lupu Bridge to Liuying Road started on 25 October 1993 and was completed on 10 December 1995.

Construction of the second phase, from Liuying Road to Outer Ring Expressway coincided with the northern extension of Shanghai Metro Line 1. The metro line is the first level above street level, while the expressway is the second level above street level. This phase was completed on 4 December 2002.

== Exit list ==
- Yaohua Rd
- Tongyao Rd (southbound exit only)
- Inner Ring Road
- Xujiahui Rd
- Huaihai M Rd (SB entrance and Northbound exit)
- Yan'an Elevated Road
- Weihai Rd (SB exit and NB entrance)
- Beijing W Rd, Xinzha Rd
- Tianmu W Rd, Tianmu M Rd
- Zhongxing Rd (SB entrance and NB exit)
- Inner Ring Rd CW (No SB exit)
- Inner Ring Rd CCW
- Yanchang Rd (SB entrance and NB exit)
- Middle Ring Road
- Wenshui Rd
- Jiangchang W Rd(NB exit only)
- Linfen Rd (SB entrance and NB exit)
- Gongjiang Rd, Changjiang W Rd, Huma Rd
- Lianyi Rd
- S20 Outer Ring Expressway
- Taihe Rd, Taihe W Rd (SB exit and NB entrance)

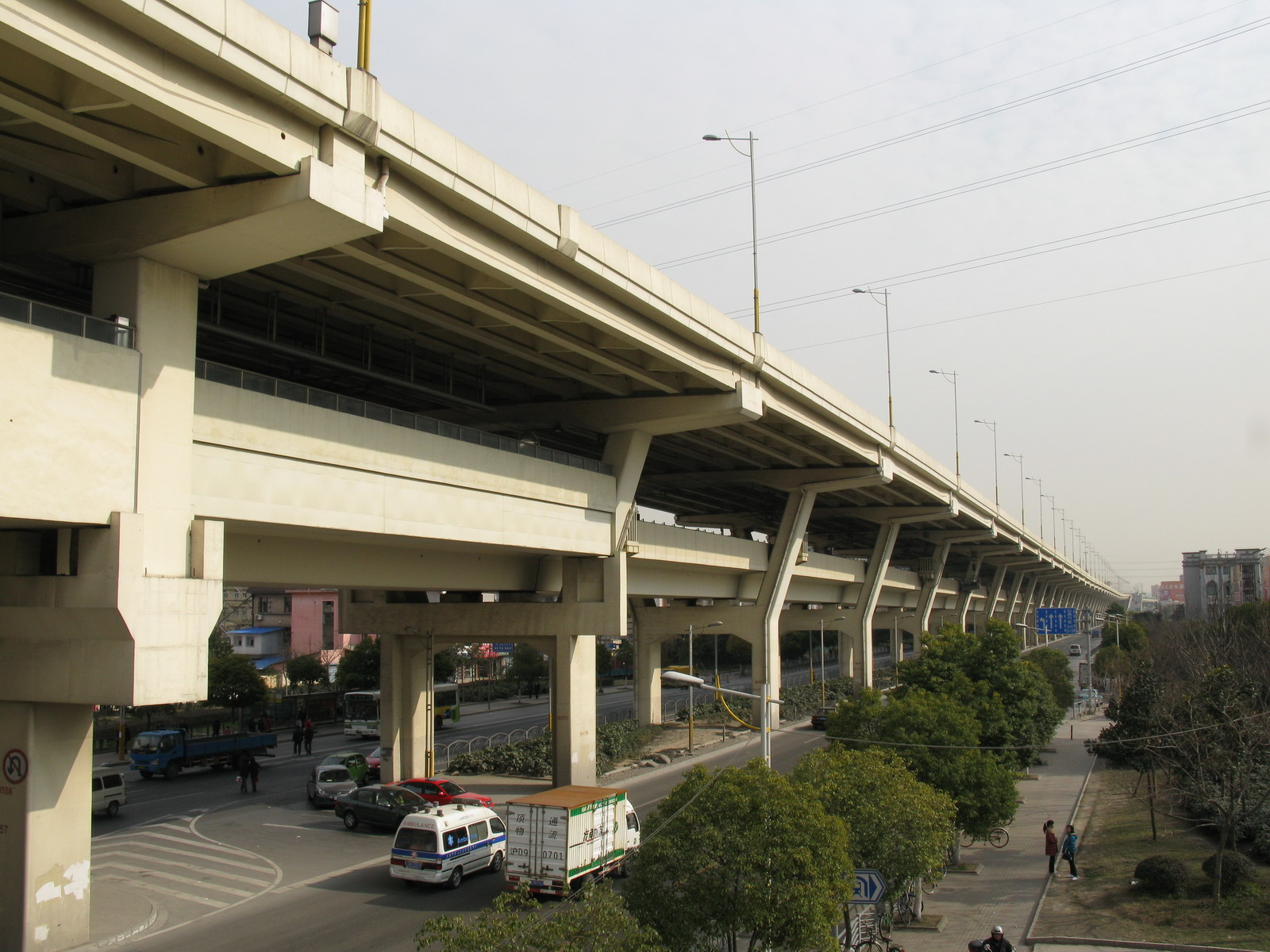
The North-South Elevated Road at West Changjiang Road. Shanghai Metro Line 1 runs on the first level above the street, and the expressway runs on the second level above the street.
