= Inner Ring Road (Shanghai) =

Elevated road in Shanghai, China

Shanghai Inner Ring Road
- 上海内环线
- Inner Ring Elevated Road 内环高架路

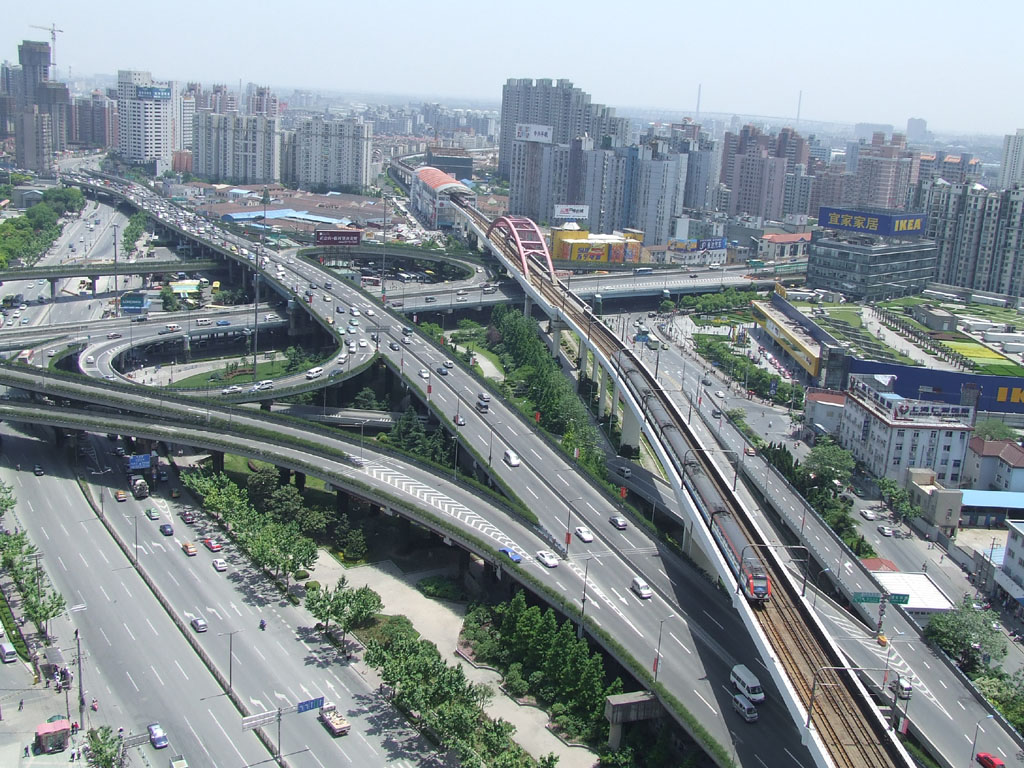
- The Inner Ring Road at the North Caoxi Road Interchange with Humin Elevated Road.

Route information
- Length: 47.7 km (29.6 mi)
- Existed: October 1994–present

Major junctions
- Orbital around Shanghai
- Counterclockwise from Yangpu Bridge: Yixian Elevated Road at Dabaishu Interchange; South-North Elevated Road at Gonghexin Road Interchange; Yan'an Elevated Road at West Yan'an Road Interchange; Humin Elevated Road at North Caoxi Road Interchange; North-South Elevated Road at Luban Road Interchange; South Yanggao Road at Longyang Road Interchange; Luoshan Road and Longdong Avenue at Zhangjiang Interchange; Middle Yanggao Road at Luoshan Road Interchange

Location
- Country: China
- Province: Shanghai

Highway system
- Transport in China

Inner Ring Road (simplified Chinese: 上海内环线; traditional Chinese: 上海內環線; pinyin: Shànghǎi Nèihuánxiàn; lit. 'Shanghai Inner Ring Line'), also known as Inner Ring Elevated Road (内环高架路; 內環高架路; Nèihuán Gāojiàlù), is an elevated expressway loop in the city of Shanghai. It was the first ring road around the city of Shanghai. The Puxi section of the road was completely grade-separated and complete in 1994, while the Pudong section of the road was completely grade-separated in 2009. Before the grade separation in Pudong, the road ran at street level, with traffic lights at intersections.

The maximum speed on the expressway is 80 kilometres per hour (50 mph), with two lanes in each direction. The Inner Ring Road crosses the Huangpu River twice, using the Yangpu and Nanpu bridges.

== Exit list ==
Inner Ring Road Exit List
District / Location	km	mi	Exit	Notes
Huangpu River			Nanpu Bridge	
Pudong New Area			South Pudong Road	Clockwise: Entrance ramp only Counter-clockwise: Exit ramp only
Pudong New Area			South Yanggao Road	
Pudong New Area			Pujian Road / Hunan Road	
Pudong New Area			Fangdian Road	Clockwise: Entrance ramp only Counter-clockwise: Exit ramp only
Pudong New Area			Longdong Elevated Road	Zhangjiang Interchange
Pudong New Area			Luoshan Elevated Road	Zhangjiang Interchange
Pudong New Area			Jinxiu Road	Counter-clockwise: Exit ramp only
Pudong New Area			Middle Yanggao Road	Luoshan Road Interchange
Pudong New Area			Zhangyang Road	Clockwise: No interchange Counter-clockwise: Exit ramp only
Pudong New Area			Pudong Avenue	Clockwise: Exit ramp only Counter-clockwise: Entrance ramp only
Huangpu River			Yangpu Bridge	
Yangpu District			Linqing Road	Clockwise: Entrance ramp only (from Meizhou Road); Counter-clockwise: Exit ramp only
Yangpu District			Zhoujiazui Road	
Yangpu District			Huangxing Road	Clockwise: Entrance ramp only
Yangpu District			Siping Road	Clockwise: Entrance ramp only Counter-clockwise: No interchange
Hongkou District			North Zhongshan Road No. 1 / No. 2	Counter-clockwise entrance ramp follows the Yixian Elevated Road entrance.
Hongkou District			Yixian Elevated Road; Middle Ring Road (Clockwise only)	via Dabaishu Interchange; Clockwise: Exit ramp only Counter-clockwise: Entrance ramp only No access to the Inner Ring Road from the Middle Ring Road
Hongkou District			Guangzhong Road	Clockwise: Exit ramp only Counter-clockwise: Entrance ramp only
Jing'an District			North Xizang Road	Clockwise: No interchange Counter-clockwise: Exit ramp only
Jing'an District			North–South Elevated Road	Gonghexin Road Interchange
Jing'an District			Hutai Road	
Putuo District			Guangxin Road	Clockwise: No interchange Counter-clockwise: Exit ramp only
Putuo District			Zhenping Road	Clockwise: Exit ramp only Counter-clockwise: No interchange
Putuo District			Wuning Road	
Putuo District			Jinshajiang Road	
Changning District			Wuyi Road	Clockwise: Entrance ramp only Counter-clockwise: Exit ramp only
Changning District			Yan'an Elevated Road	Counter-clockwise: Westbound (towards Hongqiao transportation hub) only
Changning District			Xinhua Road	Clockwise: Exit ramp only Counter-clockwise: Entrance ramp only
Xuhui District			Wuzhong Road	
Xuhui District			Caobao Road	Counter-clockwise: Exit ramp only
Xuhui District			Humin Elevated Road	Caoxi Road Interchange; Clockwise: Southboard (towards Xinzhuang Interchange) only
Xuhui District			West Longhua Road	Clockwise: No interchange Counter-clockwise: Exit ramp only
Xuhui District			Tianyaoqiao Road	Clockwise: Entrance ramp only Counter-clockwise: No interchange
Xuhui District			South Wanping Road	Clockwise: Entrance ramp only Counter-clockwise: Exit ramp only
Xuhui District			South Ruijin Road	Clockwise: Exit ramp only Counter-clockwise: Entrance ramp only
Huangpu District			North–South Elevated Road	Luban Road Interchange
Huangpu District			South Xizang Road	Clockwise: No interchange Counter-clockwise: Exit ramp only
Huangpu District			The Bund	Clockwise: Entrance ramp only Counter-clockwise: Exit ramp only
Huangpu District			South Zhongshan Road No. 1	Clockwise: Exit ramp only Counter-clockwise: Entrance ramp only All while interchanging on to Nanpu Bridge.
Huangpu District			East Zhongshan Road No. 1	Clockwise: Exit ramp only Counter-clockwise: Entrance ramp only All while interchanging on to Nanpu Bridge.
Huangpu District			Lujiabang Road	Clockwise: Exit ramp only Counter-clockwise: Entrance ramp only All while interchanging on to Nanpu Bridge.

== See also ==
- S20 Outer Ring Expressway: Another ring road in Shanghai
