= Humin Elevated Road =

Elevated road in Shanghai, China

- 沪闵高架路
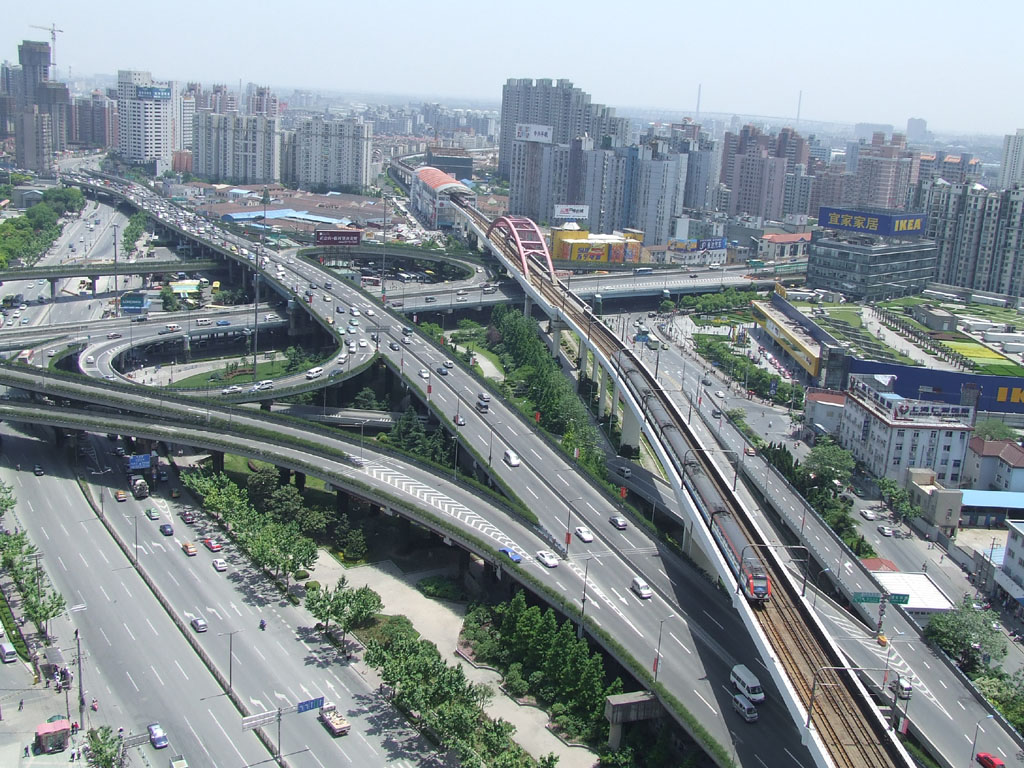
- Humin Elevated Road begins at the North Caoxi Road Interchange. It is the road going to the left out of the picture.

Route information
- Length: 13.32 km (8.28 mi)

Major junctions
- Northeast end: Inner Ring Road
- Middle Ring Road at the Meilong Interchange
- Southwest end: G60 Shanghai–Kunming Expressway, S20 Outer Ring Expressway, and S4 Hujin Expressway, Minhang District

Location
- Country: China
- Province: Shanghai

Highway system
- Transport in China

Humin Elevated Road (Chinese: 沪闵高架路; pinyin: Hùmǐn Gāojiàlù) is an elevated expressway in the city of Shanghai, China. It runs from the Inner Ring Road at the North Caoxi Road Interchange to the S20 Outer Ring Expressway, G60 Shanghai–Kunming Expressway and S4 Hujin Expressway interchange in Minhang District.

The first phase of Humin Elevated Road ran from the Inner Ring Road to Shanghai South railway station, totaling 2.52 km. The second phase, which opened in December 2003, extended the expressway further southwest to its present state.

== Exit list ==
- Continues as Caoxi N Rd
- Inner Ring Road CW (No NB entrance)
- Inner Ring Road CCW (No SB exit)
- Caobao Rd (SB exit and NB entrance)
- Liuzhou Rd, Guilin Rd
- Shanghai South railway station
- Hongmei Rd (SB exit and NB entrance)
- Middle Ring Road North (SB exit only)
- Middle Ring Road South (SB entrance and NB exit)
- Lianhua Rd, Lianhua S Rd (SB exit and NB entrance)
- Baochun Rd (SB entrance and NB exit) and Xinzhuang Interchange (S20, G60, S4)
- Continues as G60
