= S1 Yingbin Expressway =

Road in Shanghai, China

Yingbin Expressway

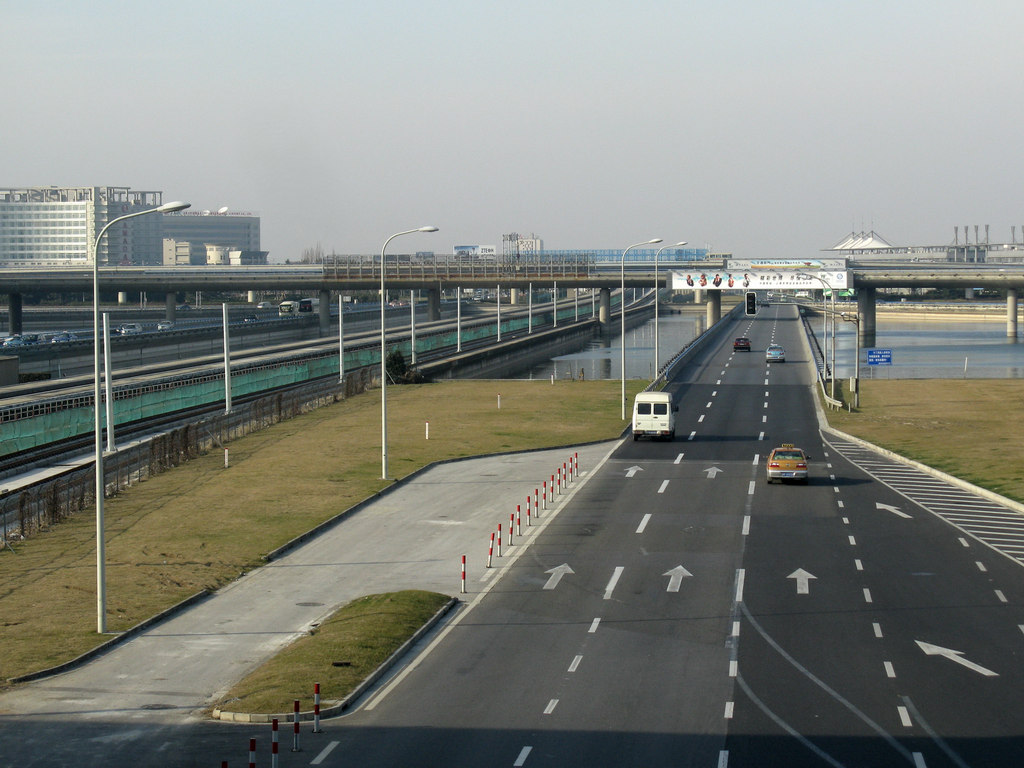

Route information
- Length: 14.47 km (8.99 mi)
- Existed: 15 September 1999–present

Major junctions
- West end: Shanghai S2 / Shanghai S20 in Pudong New Area
- G1503 in Pudong New Area; Huaxia Elevated Road
- East end: Shanghai S32 at Pudong International Airport

Location
- Country: China
- Province: Shanghai

Highway system
- Transport in China
← Shanghai S36	→ Shanghai S2

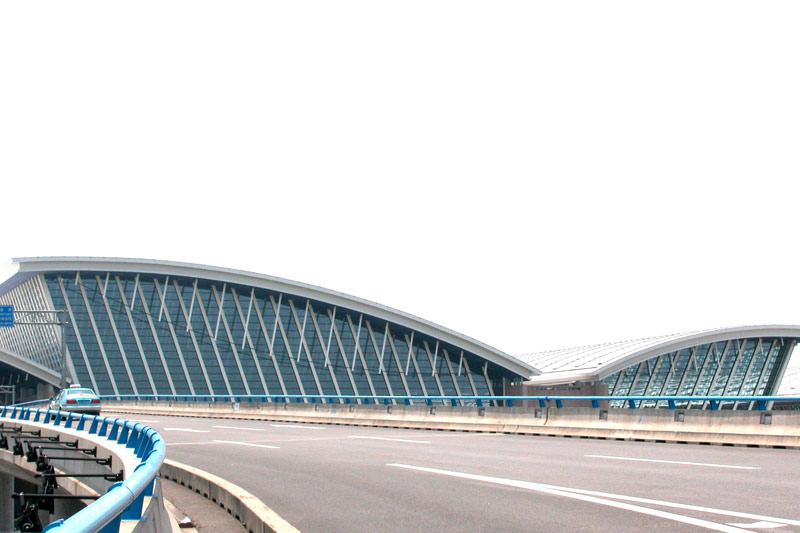
Yingbin Expressway is the main expressway from the city center to Pudong International Airport, shown here.

The Yingbin Expressway (Chinese: 迎宾高速公路; pinyin: Yíngbīn Gāosù Gōnglù; lit. 'Welcome Expressway') is a 14.4-kilometre-long expressway (8.9 mi) in the city of Shanghai, China. It is designated S1 for its entire length and serves as the main expressway from the city center to Pudong International Airport, Shanghai's main international airport. Before 2009, it was designated as A1.

== Route ==
The Yingbin Expressway is located in Shanghai's Pudong New Area. It begins at the Outer Ring Yingbin Expressway Interchange (Chinese: 外环迎宾高速立交), a four-way interchange with the Shanghai Outer Ring Expressway to the north and west and the S2 Shanghai–Luchaogang Expressway to the south. It travels eastward, paralleling much of the route of the Shanghai Maglev Train, which runs directly above the expressway. After an interchange with G1503 Shanghai Ring Expressway, it curves south and enters the Pudong International Airport lands. The expressway continues south, past the airport, as the Shanghai–Jiaxing–Huzhou Expressway. The portion through the airport lands itself that connects to the Shanghai–Jiaxing–Huzhou Expressway is not signed nor designated as S1 itself, but usually still referred to as the Yingbin Expressway.

== Exit list ==
Location	km	mi	Exit	Name	Destinations	Notes
Shanghai S1 (Yingbin Expressway)
Pudong New Area, Shanghai	0	0	27	Outer Ring Yingbin Expressway Interchange	Shanghai S2 / Shanghai S20	
Pudong New Area, Shanghai	3	1.9	30	X659 (Tanghuang Road)		Eastbound exit and westbound entrance only
Pudong New Area, Shanghai	5	3.1	32	Shanghai S222 (Nanliu Highway) / X009 (Chuanzhou Highway)		
Pudong New Area, Shanghai	6	3.7	33	X575 (Chuansha Road)		
Pudong New Area, Shanghai	9	5.6	36	Gujiang Road		Eastbound exit and entrance; westbound entrance only. Destination signs indicate exit to Gujiang Road, however, Gujiang Road is still under construction
Pudong New Area, Shanghai	10	6.2	37	Shanghai S221 (Chuan'nanfeng Highway)		
Pudong New Area, Shanghai	12	7.5	39	Shanghai Ring Yingbin Expressway Interchange	G1503	
Pudong New Area, Shanghai	13	8.1		Huaxia Elevated Road		Westbound exit and eastbound entrance only
Pudong New Area, Shanghai	13	8.1		X614 (East Huazhou Road)		Access to Pudong International Airport employee areas
Pudong New Area, Shanghai	14.4	8.9		Pudong International Airport		
Continues south of Pudong International Airport as Shanghai S32 (Shanghai–Jiaxing–Huzhou Expressway)
Closed/former; Concurrency terminus; HOV only; Incomplete access; Tolled; Route transition; Unopened
