= Yan'an Elevated Road =

Elevated road in Shanghai, China

- 延安高架路

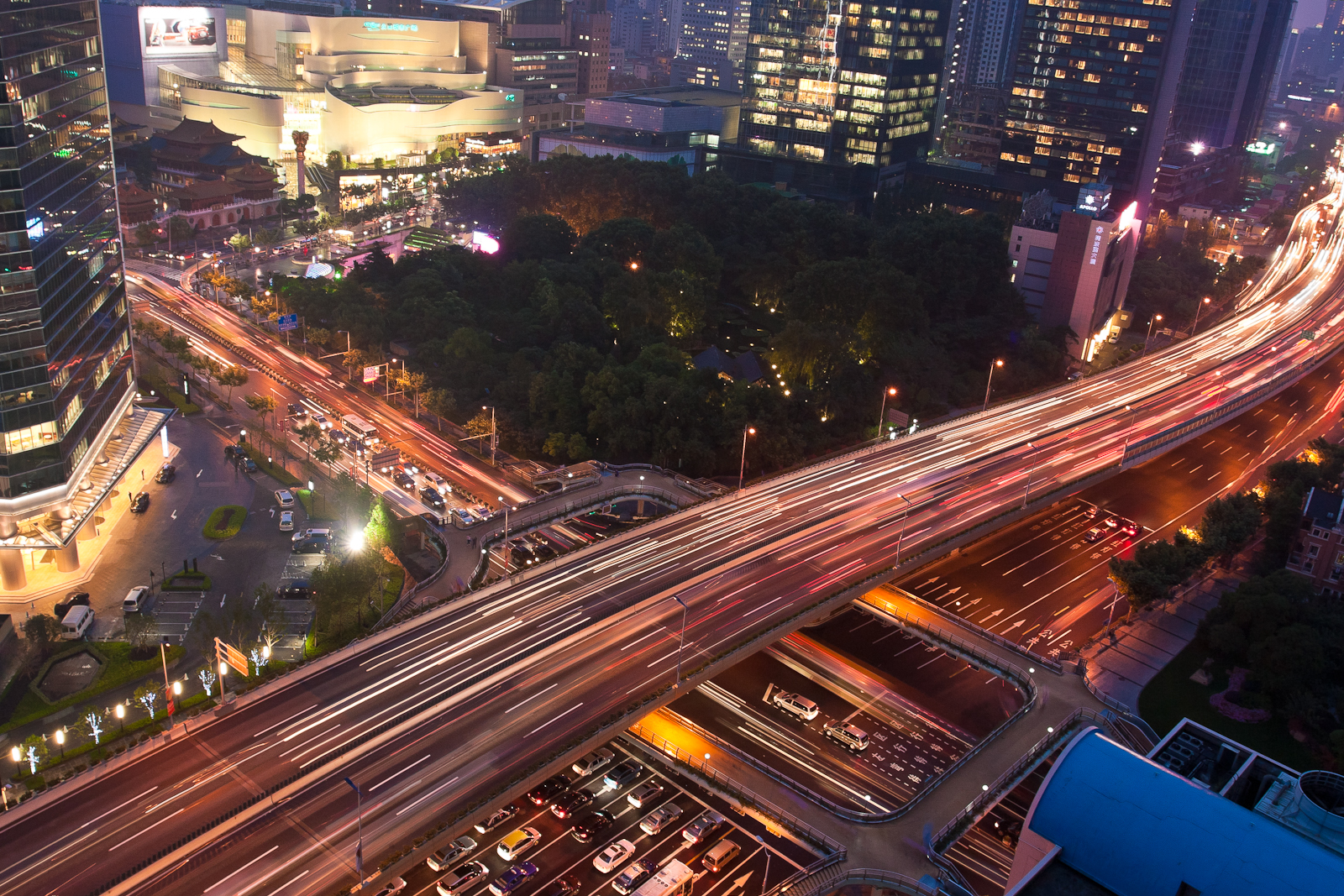
- Traffic on Yan'an Elevated Road passes over Huashan Road at night.

Route information
- Length: 15 km (9.3 mi)

Major junctions
- West end: Yingbin No. 1 Road, Hongqiao International Airport
- Hongxu Road and Beihong Road, to Middle Ring Road; Inner Ring Road at the West Yan'an Road Interchange; South-North Elevated Road at the East Yan'an Road Interchange
- East end: East Zhongshan No. 1 Road, The Bund, Bund Tunnel, East Yan'an Road Tunnel

Location
- Country: China
- Province: Shanghai

Highway system
- Transport in China

Yan'an Elevated Road (Chinese: 延安高架路; pinyin: Yán'ān Gāojiàlù; Shanghainese: Yi'ue Kohgalu) is an elevated expressway in the city of Shanghai, China. It runs along Yan'an Road in its entirety, continuing from the east terminus of G50 Shanghai-Chongqing Expressway at Huqingping Interchange (close to Hongqiao International Airport) to just beyond the old building of Shanghai Natural History Museum, at which point it ends and rejoins Yan'an Road on the surface. Traffic is then partly directed underground to the Bund Tunnel (completed 2010). Motorists continuing east can cross the Huangpu River using the East Yan'an Road Tunnel to Pudong, but indirectly.

The maximum speed on the expressway is 80 km/h.

Construction on the first portion of the elevated roadway, from the Inner Ring Road to Hongqiao Airport, began on 28 November 1995 and was completed on 2 December 1996. The expressway originally stretched down the whole length of Yan'an Road, ending with a left-turning ramp onto the surface road of the Bund. In 2008, to improve cityscape in the historic area near the Bund, the easternmost section of the expressway was demolished.

Part of the elevated expressway is decorated by blue neon lights, which were featured in James Bond movie Skyfall.

== Exit list ==
- Yan'an E Road Tunnel (Westbound entrance and Eastbound exit)
- Henan S Rd (WB entrance and EB exit)
- Xizang M/S Rd (WB entrance and EB exit)
- North-South Elevated Road
- Shimen 1st Rd (WB exit and EB entrance)
- Maoming N/S Rd (WB entrance and EB exit)
- Huashan Rd (WB exit and EB entrance)
- Jiangsu Rd
- Kaixuan Rd (WB exit and EB entrance)
- Inner Ring Road South (No EB Entrance)
- Inner Ring Elevated Road North
- Hongqiao Rd, Gubei Rd (WB exit and EB entrance)
- Hongxu Rd, TO Middle Ring Road
- S20 Outer Ring Expressway, Hongqiao Airport Terminal 1
- Continues as G50 Shanghai–Chongqing Expressway
