= S4 Shanghai–Jinshan Expressway =

Road in Shanghai, China

Shanghai–Jinshan Expressway
- Hujin Expressway 沪金高速公路

Route information
- Length: 44.06 km (27.38 mi)

Major junctions
- North end: G60 / Shanghai S20 / G320 Humin Highway / Humin Elevated Road in Minhang District
- Shanghai S32 in Minhang District; G1503 in Fengxian District
- South end: G15 in Jinshan District

Location
- Country: China
- Province: Shanghai

Highway system
- Transport in China
← S3	→ S5

The Shanghai–Jinshan Expressway, commonly referred to as the Hujin Expressway (Chinese: 沪金高速公路; pinyin: Hùjīn Gāosù) and designated S4, is an expressway in the city of Shanghai, China. It runs generally in a north-south direction from the Xinzhuang Interchange, a large interchange with the Outer Ring Expressway, the G60 Shanghai–Kunming Expressway, the G92 Hangzhou Bay Ring Expressway, and Humin Elevated Road in Minhang District to Jinshan District, ending at an interchange with the G15 Shenyang–Haikou Expressway. The expressway is tolled south of the Zhuanqiao Service Area in Minhang District, between the exits to Yindu Road and the Shanghai–Jiaxing–Huzhou Expressway.

Before August 2009, the expressway was known as the A4 Expressway.

== List of exits and interchanges ==
- Interchange with S20 Outer Ring Expressway, Humin Elevated Road, G320 Humin Highway and G60 Shanghai–Kunming Expressway
- X220 Xinzhu Road - northbound entrance only from westbound, southbound exit only to westbound
- X228 Chunshen Road
- X231 Yindu Road - northbound entrance only from westbound, southbound exit only to westbound
- Shanghai–Jiaxing–Huzhou Expressway
- S323 Jianchuan Road
- X421 Xizha Highway - northbound entrance only from westbound, southbound exit only to westbound
- S324 Daye Highway
- S306 Tuannan Highway and Nianfeng Road
- Interchange with G1501 Shanghai Ring Expressway
- X431 Haiwan Road
- North Muhua Road - to Shanghai Chemical Industries Zone
- X262 Zhuanghu Highway
- Interchange with G15 Shenyang–Haikou Expressway and exit to X250 Tingwei Highway
