= Yixian Elevated Road =

Elevated road in Shanghai, China

- 逸仙高架路

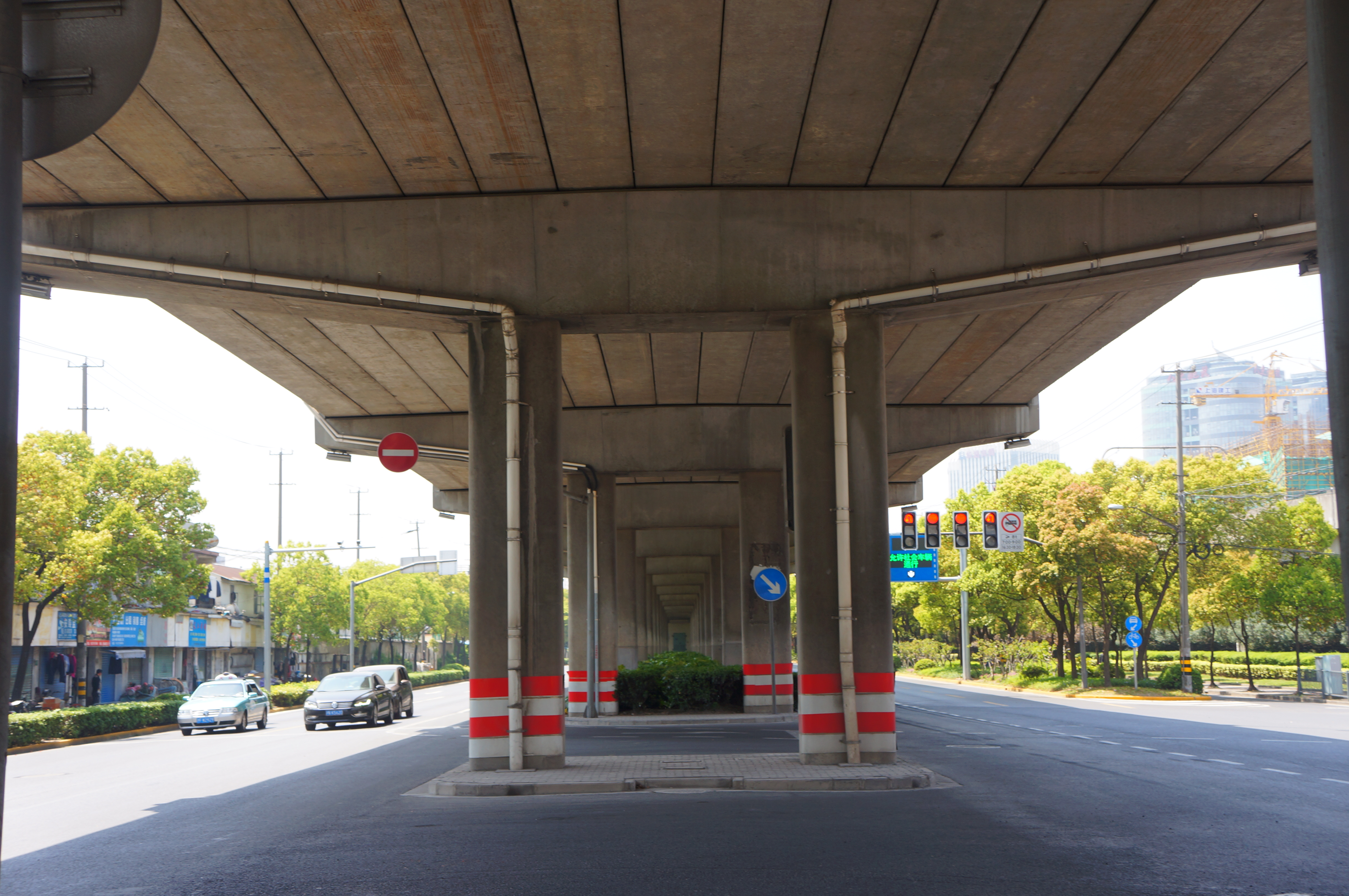

Route information
- Length: 9.5 km (5.9 mi)

Major junctions
- South end: Inner Ring Road
- Middle Ring Road at the Dabaishu Interchange; Jungong Road
- North end: Shanghai S20; continues north as G1503 (Shanghai Ring Expressway), Baoshan District

Location
- Country: China
- Province: Shanghai

Highway system
- Transport in China

Yixian Elevated Road (Chinese: 逸仙高架路; pinyin: Yìxian Gāojiàlù) is an elevated expressway in the city of Shanghai, China. It runs from the Inner Ring Road at the Dabaishu Interchange to the S20 Outer Ring Expressway and G1503 Shanghai Ring Expressway in Baoshan District.

The first phase of the Yixian Elevated Road ran from the Inner Ring Road to Jungong Road only. The elevated expressway was extended in a second phase to Baoshan District and the S20 Outer Ring Expressway. This opened on 6 July 2004 and shortened the commute from Baoshan District to Dabaishu from 30 to 10 minutes.

The expressway is named after Sun Yat-sen.

== Exit List ==
- Zhongshan N 2nd Rd (Northbound entrance and Southbound exit)
- Middle Ring Road CW (No SB entrance)
- Middle Ring Road CCW (NB entrance and SB exit)
- Wan'an Rd, Changzhong Rd, Zhengli Rd
- Ying'ao W Rd, Ying'ao Rd, Gaoyi Rd
- Changyi Rd (SB entrance only)
- Jungong Rd (No NB exit)
- Changjiang Rd W (Exit only)
- Taihe Ave (NB exit only)
- S20 Outer Ring Expressway CW (NB entrance and exit)
- S20 Outer Ring Expressway CCW (SB entrance and exit)
- Songbin Rd (SB entrance and exit)

Continues as G1503 Shanghai Ring Expressway
