= S6 Shanghai–Nanxiang Expressway =

Road in Shanghai, China

S6 Expressway
- 上海－南翔高速公路
- Huxiang Expressway 沪翔高速公路

Location
- Country: China
- Province: Shanghai

Highway system
- Transport in China; Expressways of Shanghai

Huxiang Expressway (Chinese: 沪翔高速公路), designated S6 and originally known as A17 Expressway, is an expressway in Shanghai, China.
