= Huaxia Elevated Road =

Elevated road in Shanghai, China

- 华夏高架路

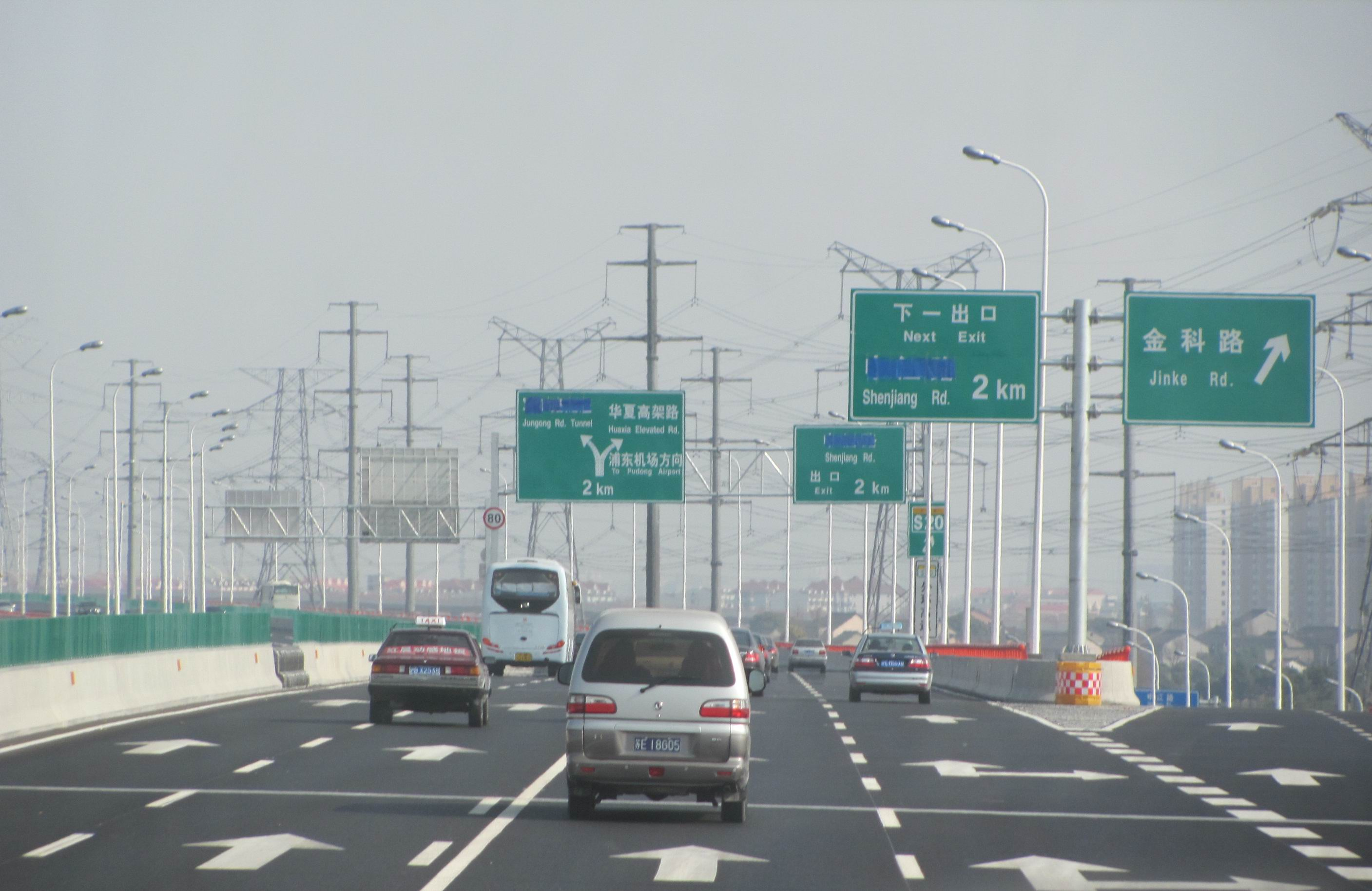
- The western terminus of Huaxia Elevated Road at the Middle Ring Road.

Route information
- Length: 15.6 km (9.7 mi)
- Existed: 25 December 2009–present

Major junctions
- West end: Middle Ring Road in Pudong New Area
- Shanghai S20 in Pudong New Area; G1503 in Pudong New Area
- East end: Shanghai S1 in Pudong New Area

Location
- Country: China
- Province: Shanghai

Highway system
- Transport in China

The Huaxia Elevated Road (Chinese: 华夏高架路) is a 15.6-kilometre (9.7 mi) long elevated expressway entirely in the Pudong New Area of Shanghai, a direct-controlled municipality in the People's Republic of China. It opened to traffic on 25 December 2009, and connects the Middle Ring Road with the Yingbin Expressway. It serves as a new roadway from Shanghai Pudong International Airport to the city centre. It makes the journey from Shanghai Pudong International Airport to the city centre in 30 minutes, and to Shanghai Hongqiao International Airport, via the Middle Ring Road, in 60 minutes. The route normally takes 70 percent of traffic flow to Shanghai Pudong International Airport.
