= Outer Ring Tunnel =

River-crossing tunnel in Shanghai

Coordinates: 31.3788°N 121.4999°E

- Interactive map of Outer Ring Tunnel

Overview
- Start: Baoshan District
- End: Sancha Port

Operation
- Opened: June 21, 2003

Technical
- Length: 2880 km
- Operating speed: 80 km/h

The Outer Ring tunnel, also known as the Taihe Road Tunnel, is a highway tunnel under the Huangpu River in Shanghai. The tunnel serves as part of the S20 Expressway and was completed on June 21, 2023. The tunnel runs east to west from Baoshan District to Sancha Port after crossing the Huangpu. The tunnel is 2,880 metres (9,450 ft) long and features 8 lanes with a speed limit of 80 km/h, which made it the longest underwater tunnel in Asia and third worldwide by length.

The tunnel has been closed for 12 months due to construction since March 22, 2024.
