= Shanghai–Changzhou Expressway =

Road in Shanghai, China

Shanghai–Changzhou Expressway
- 上海–常州高速公路
- Huchang Expressway 沪常高速公路

Route information
- Length: 170.7 km (106.1 mi) Shanghai portion: 25.7 km (16.0 mi) Jiangsu portion: 145 km (90 mi)

Major junctions
- East end: Jiamin Elevated Road in Minhang, Shanghai
- West end: Jiangsu S39 in Changzhou, Jiangsu

Location
- Country: China

Highway system
- Transport in China
- Transport in China; Expressways of Shanghai
- Transport in China; Expressways of Jiangsu
← Shanghai S20	Shanghai S26	→ Shanghai S32
← Jiangsu S55	Jiangsu S58	→ Jiangsu S59

The Shanghai–Changzhou Expressway (Chinese: 上海–常州高速公路), commonly referred to as the Huchang Expressway (Chinese: 沪常高速公路), is a completed 170.7-kilometre-long Chinese expressway (106.1 mi) that connects the cities of Shanghai and Changzhou. In Shanghai, it is designated S26, and in Jiangsu, it is designated S58.

It connects the cities of Shanghai, Suzhou, Wuxi, and Changzhou and serves as an important expressway between the province of Jiangsu and the direct-controlled municipality of Shanghai. This expressway is a part of the Yangtze River Delta Region and in a 2023 study, the area it serves was found to have a low PM_{2.5} concentration. It was developed following promotion led by a large number of expo pavilions to improve Shanghai's urban infrastructure and transportation facilities.

The Shanghai portion of the expressway is 25.7 km (16.0 mi) in length. The Jiangsu portion is 145 km (90 mi) in length. The expressway was fully completed on 30 December 2021.

The Beiheng passage passing through the Beidi tunnel and an elevated highway is also connected to the Shanghai-Changzhou Expressway.
