= Xupu Bridge =

Xupu Bridge 徐浦大桥
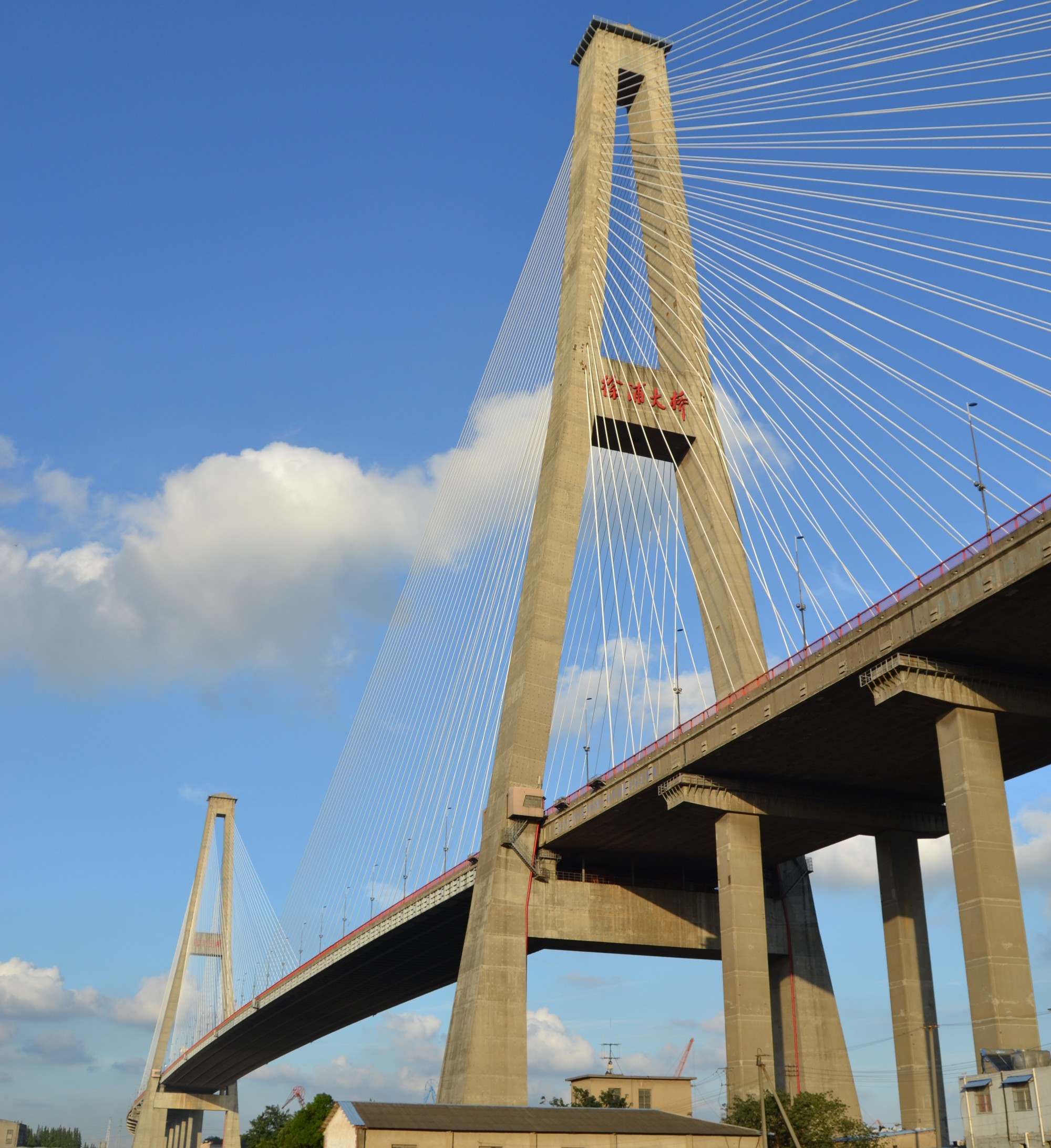
- Coordinates: 31.129167°N 121.464167°E
- Carries: 8 lanes of Shanghai S20 (Outer Ring Expressway)
- Crosses: Huangpu River
- Locale: Shanghai, China
- Owner: Shanghai Foundation Engineering Co.
- Preceded by: Minpu Bridge
- Followed by: Lupu Bridge

Characteristics
- Design: Cable-stayed
- Width: 35.95 m (118 ft)
- Height: 212.5 m (697 ft)
- Longest span: 590 m (1,936 ft)

History
- Designer: Shanghai Municipal Engineering Design Institute
- Opened: 1997

Location
- Interactive map of Xupu Bridge

The Xupu Bridge (simplified Chinese: 徐浦大桥; traditional Chinese: 徐浦大橋; pinyin: Xúpǔ Dàqiáo) is a cable-stayed bridge over the Huangpu River in Shanghai, China, so named because it connects the city's Xuhui and Pudong districts. It opened in 1997 and carries 8 lanes of the S20 Outer Ring Expressway.

== See also ==
- Yangpu Bridge, a cable-stayed bridge across Huangpu River in Shanghai.
- Lupu Bridge, an arch bridge across Huangpu River in Shanghai.
- List of bridges in China
- List of longest cable-stayed bridge spans
- List of tallest bridges
