= Middle Ring Road (Shanghai) =

Ring road in Shanghai, China

- 中环路

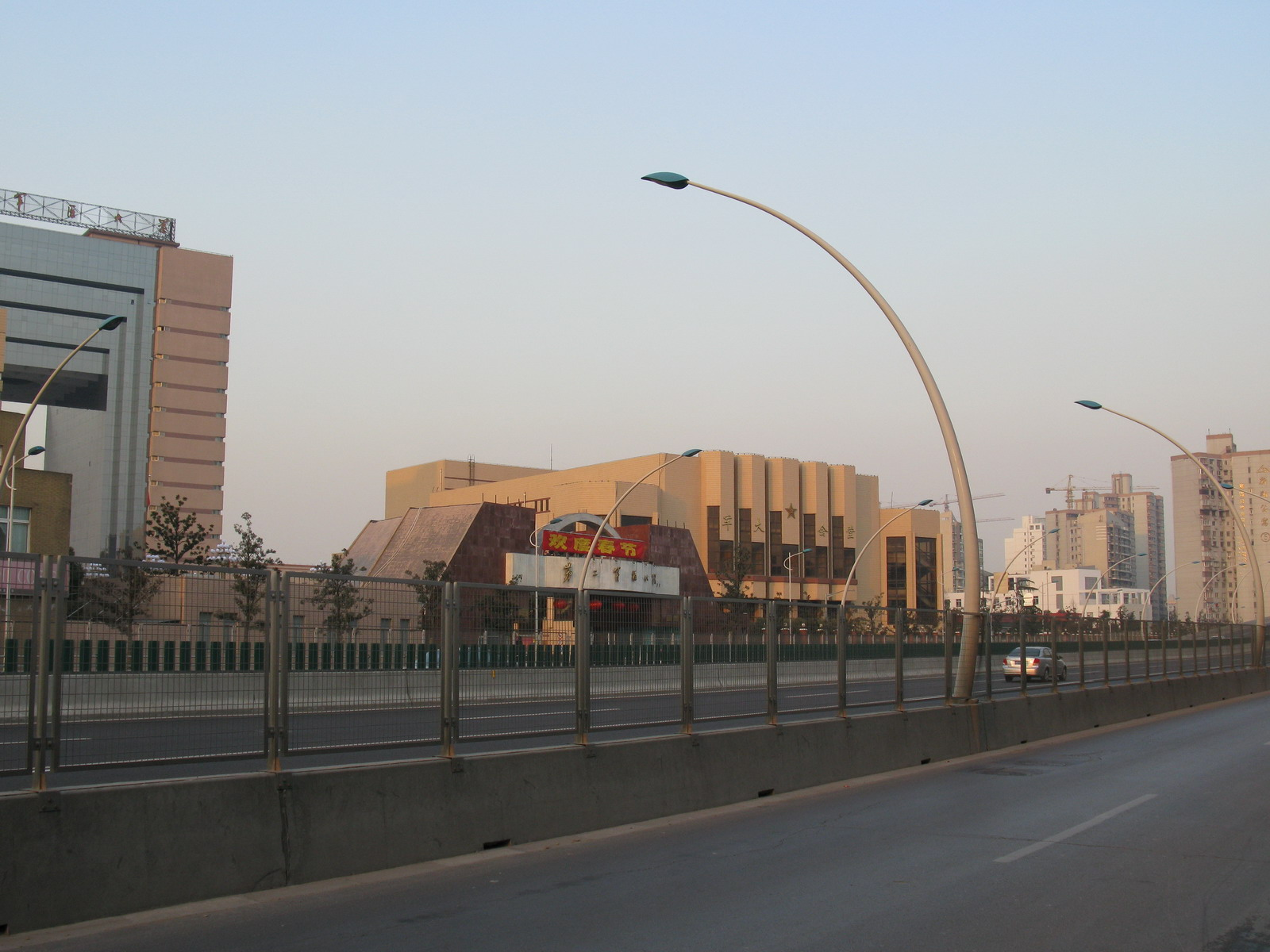
- The Middle Ring Road in Yangpu District.

Route information
- Length: 59.25 km (36.82 mi)

Major junctions
- Orbital around Shanghai
- Counterclockwise from Jungong Road Tunnel: Xiangyin Road and Jungong Road, to Xiangyin Road Tunnel; Yixian Elevated Road at the Dabaishu Interchange, to Inner Ring Road; South-North Elevated Road at the Middle Ring Gonghexin Road Interchange; Shanghai–Jiading Expressway; Beijing−Shanghai Expressway and Wuning Road; Beidi Elevated Road; Humin Elevated Road; Jiyang Road, to Lupu Bridge; South Yanggao Road; Huaxia Elevated Road, Shenjiang Road

Location
- Country: China
- Province: Shanghai

Highway system
- Transport in China

Middle Ring Road (simplified Chinese: 中环路; traditional Chinese: 中環路; pinyin: Zhōnghuán Lù) is a ring expressway in Shanghai, China. It is the second smallest in a series of four ring expressways around the city of Shanghai. Construction began in April 2003 on the first section of the Middle Ring Road in Yangpu District. The Middle Ring Road crosses the Huangpu River twice through the Jungong Road Tunnel and the Shangzhong Road Tunnel. On the Pudong side, the southern section from the Shangzhong Road Tunnel to Shenjiang Road opened on 25 December 2009. Most sections of the ring road are elevated. However, some sections passing through the Changning, Minhang, and Yangpu districts run at-grade and utilize Texas U-turn interchanges with the expressway running in a trenched underpass.

== Exits ==
- Yaolong Rd (CW exit and CCW entrance)
- Shangzhong W Rd, Hongmei S Rd (CW entrance and CCW exit)
- Humin Elevated Rd
- Gudai Rd, Jiang'an Rd (CW entrance and CCW exit)
- Caobao Rd
- Wuzhong Rd
- Xianxia Rd (No CW entrance)
- Beidi Rd
- Tianshan Rd (CW entrance and CCW exit)
- Jinshajiang Rd (CW entrance and CCW exit)
- G2, G42
- Tongchuan Rd Exit (Outer Ring)
- Zhennan Rd Entrance (Outer Ring)
- Taopu Rd Exit & Entrance (Inner Ring)
