= Bund Tunnel =

Road tunnel in Shanghai, China

Coordinates: 31.2375°N 121.4903°E

Bund Tunnel 外滩隧道
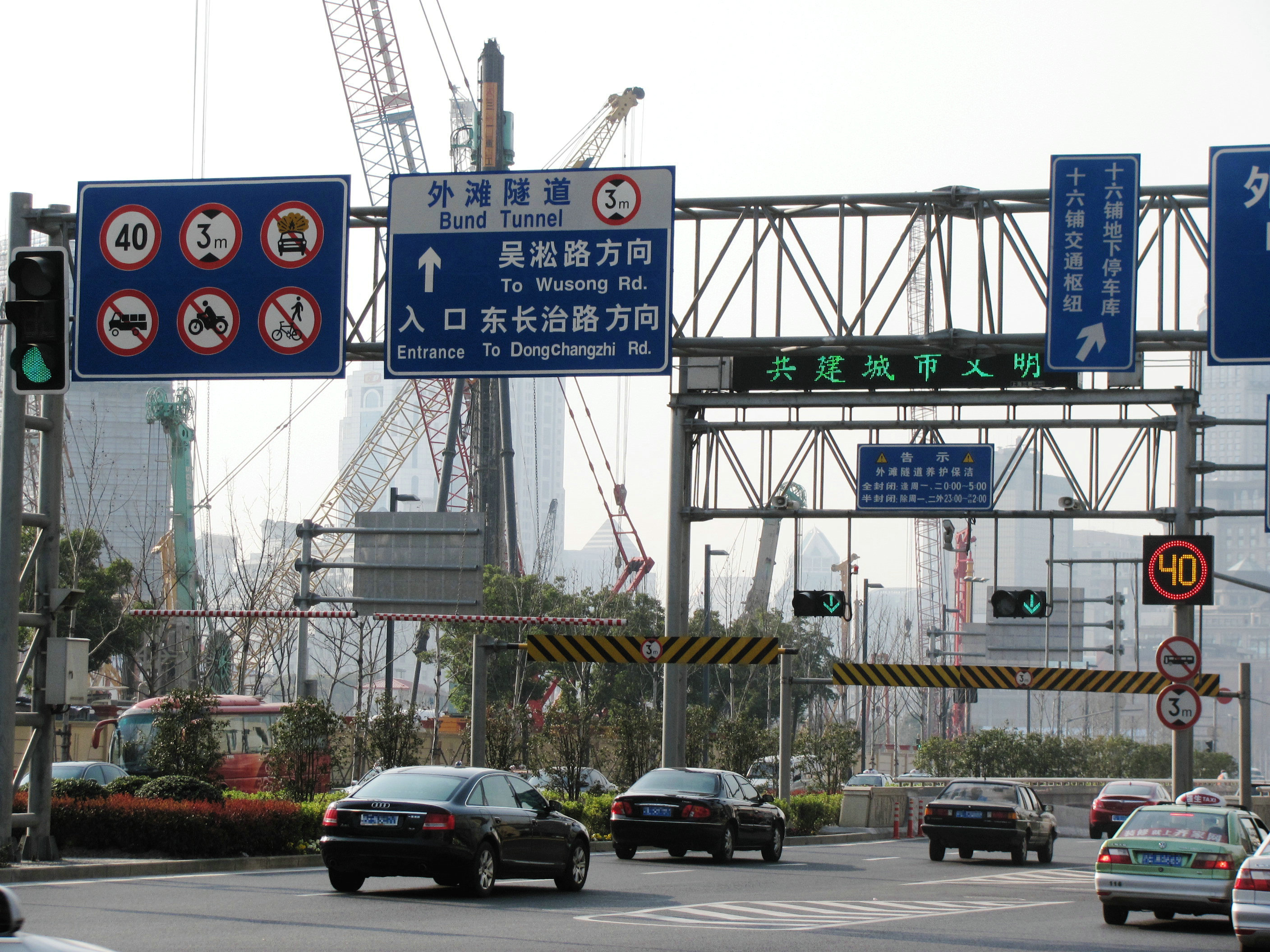
- The southern entrance to the Bund Tunnel at Dongmen Road.
- Interactive map of Bund Tunnel 外滩隧道

Overview
- Location: Beneath the Bund
- Status: Active
- Start: Huangpu District, Shanghai
- End: Hongkou District, Shanghai

Operation
- Opened: 28 March 2010

Technical
- Length: 3.3 kilometres (2.1 mi)
- No. of lanes: 6
- Operating speed: 40 kilometres per hour (25 mph)
- Tunnel clearance: 3 metres (9.8 ft)

The Bund Tunnel (Chinese: 外滩隧道; pinyin: Wàitān Suìdào) is a 3.3 km (2.1 mi) sub-surface road and road tunnel in the city of Shanghai, China. The tunnel connects the districts of Hongkou to the north and Huangpu to the south.

In the south, the tunnel begins on a stretch of South Zhongshan Road, which runs along the western bank of the Huangpu River, on the east side of the old Chinese city. It follows South Zhongshan Road and No. 2 East Zhongshan Road, crosses Yan'an Road, a major east-west artery (with a major exit to and from Yan'an Road), then follows East No. 1 Zhongshan Road through the Bund. At the northern end of the Bund, where the surface road joins the historic Garden Bridge to cross Suzhou Creek, the tunnel also crosses Suzhou Creek under the bridge. On the northern bank of Suzhou Creek, the tunnel briefly follows Daming Road, with another major exit leading east onto Changzhi Road, while the main tunnel veers west and joins Wusong Road.

Construction on the tunnel began in 2007. The southern section of the tunnel is a subsurface road built using cut and cover methods, while the northern part was tunnelled using a shield method. The tunnel has two levels, with each level carrying three lanes of traffic in one direction. The tunnel was opened on 28 March 2010.

== Replaced structures ==
The construction of the tunnel was designed to relieve the heavy traffic through the Bund area. It rendered obsolete two late 20th-century structures which had impacted the streetscape and sightlines in the Bund area, allowing them to be removed.

The Bund Tunnel replaced the road transport function of the Wusong Road Gate Bridge over Suzhou Creek (and its water control function was replaced by the new Jinshan Road Gate). The concrete road bridge and flood gate, which was built to the west of Garden Bridge to relieve traffic from the historic bridge, was criticised for affecting the historic sightlines between Garden Bridge and landmarks further up Suzhou Creek (such as the General Post Office Building). Wusong Road Gate Bridge was demolished in 2009, prior to the completion of the Bund Tunnel.

Additionally, instead of being directed to surface roads, traffic entering the Bund from Yan'an Road could now be directed underground into the Bund Tunnel. This made the large concrete ramp by which the Yan'an Elevated Road joined the Bund redundant. The ramp, which was informally called the No. 1 Turing Ramp in Asia by citizens, along with a significant stretch of the elevated expressway, which had long impacted the streetscape near Yan'an Road's junction with the Bund, was demolished.
