= Shanghai–Jiaxing–Huzhou Expressway =

Road in Zhejiang and Shanghai, China

Shanghai–Jiaxing–Huzhou Expressway
- 上海–嘉兴–湖州高速公路
- Shenjiahu Expressway 申嘉湖高速公路
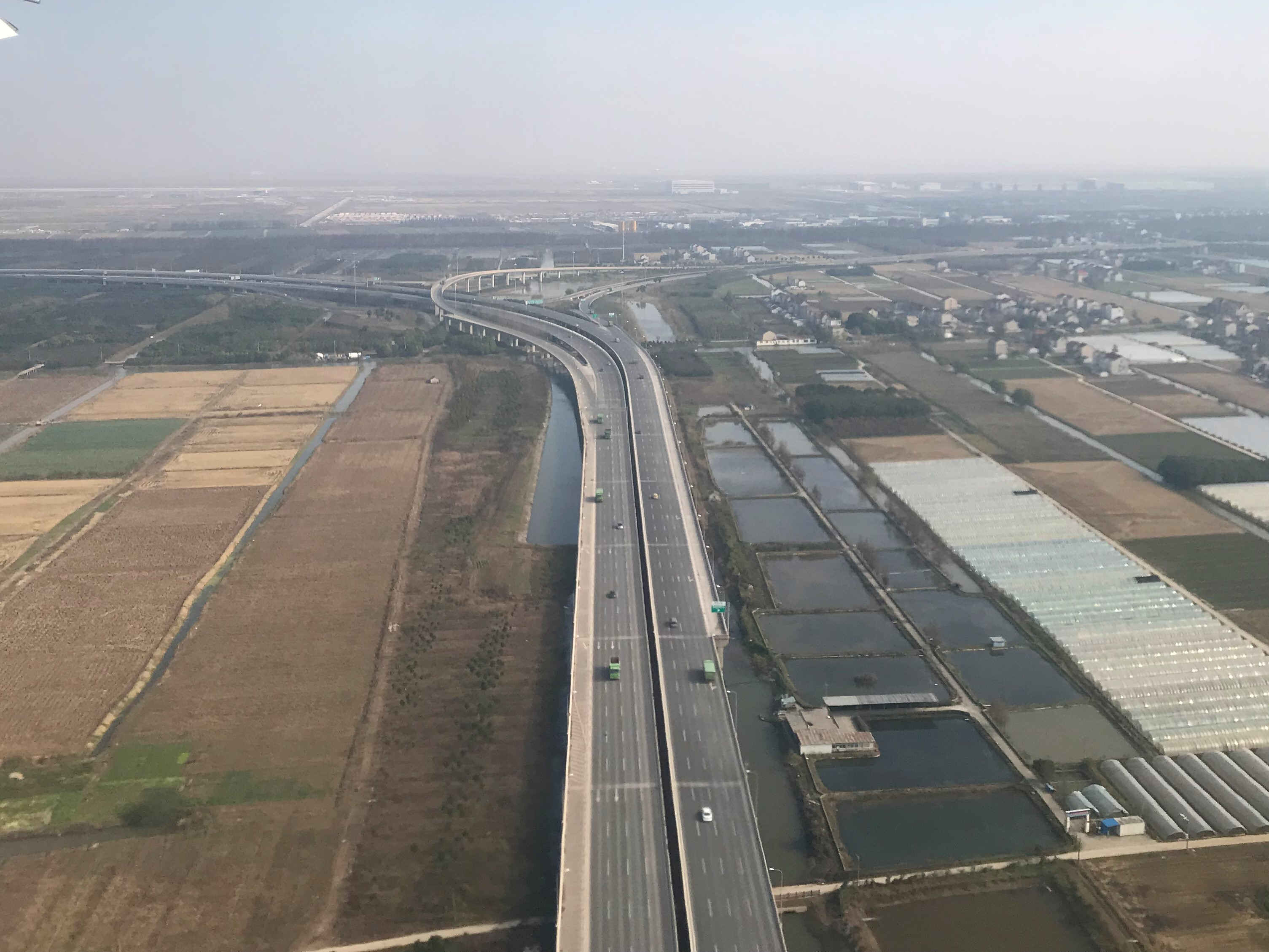
- S32 near Shanghai Pudong International Airport

Route information
- Length: 188 km (117 mi)

Major junctions
- West end: G25 in Wuxing District, Huzhou, Zhejiang
- Zhejiang S13 in Nanxun District, Huzhou, Zhejiang; G1522 in Xiuzhou District, Jiaxing, Zhejiang; G1503 in Songjiang District, Shanghai; G15 in Songjiang District, Shanghai; Shanghai S4 in Minhang District, Shanghai; Shanghai S2 in Pudong New Area, Shanghai; G1503 in Pudong New Area, Shanghai
- East end: Pudong International Airport ( Shanghai S1), Pudong New Area, Shanghai

Location
- Country: China

Highway system
- Transport in China
- Transport in China; Expressways of Shanghai
- Transport in China; Expressways of Zhejiang
← Shanghai S26	Shanghai S32	→ Shanghai S36
← Zhejiang S11	Zhejiang S12	→ Zhejiang S13

The Shanghai–Jiaxing–Huzhou Expressway, commonly referred to as the Shenjiahu Expressway (Chinese: 申嘉湖高速公路; pinyin: Shēnjiāhú Gāosù Gōnglù), is an expressway in the Chinese province of Zhejiang and city of Shanghai. In Shanghai, it is designated S32, and in Zhejiang, it is designated S12. It serves as an important connection between Pudong International Airport in Shanghai and the cities of Jiaxing and Huzhou in the province of Zhejiang.
