= Puxi =

Historic center of Shanghai, China

Location within Shanghai

Puxi (Chinese: 浦西; pinyin: Pǔxī, Shanghainese Phu^{上}-shi^{平}, lit "Huangpu West Bank") is the historic center of Shanghai, China, and remains the home of approximately 48% of Shanghai's residents in an area of 288 km^{2}. Puxi is distinguished from Pudong to its east, which is separated from it by the Huangpu River.

Administratively, Puxi consists of a number of districts including Yangpu, Hongkou, Putuo, Changning, Xuhui, Jing'an and Huangpu.

== Culture and entertainment ==
The Shanghai Zoo and cultural centers including the The Bund, the Shanghai Grand Theatre, and the Shanghai Museum are in Puxi, as are Century Park, Shanghai Disneyland Park the Oriental Pearl Tower, the Shanghai World Financial Center and the Shanghai Tower (the tallest skyscraper in Shanghai).

== Corresponding Administrative Zones ==
Administrative division	Area in km^{2}	Population 2000C	Population 2010C	Population 2020C	Pop'n density (/km^{2} 2020)
Yangpu 杨浦区	60.55	1,243,757	1,313,222	1,242,548	20,521
Hongkou 虹口区	23.41	860,726	852,476	757,498	32,358
Jing'an 静安区	36.77	1,103,949	1,077,284	975,707	26,535
Putuo 普陀区	55.16	1,051,672	1,288,881	1,239,800	22,476
Changning (长宁区)	37.16	702,239	690,571	693,051	18,650
Huangpu (黄浦区)	20.49	903,451	678,670	662,030	32,310
Xuhui (徐汇区)	55.16	1,064,645	1,085,130	1,113,078	20,179
Puxi area	288.7	6,930,439	6,986,234	6,683,712	23,151
Percent of Shanghai	4.55%	42.2%	30.3%	26.9%	

source: https://www.citypopulation.de/en/china/shanghai/admin/

== Transportation ==
Shanghai's older airport, Shanghai Hongqiao International Airport, is located in Puxi. All international flights, including regional flights to Hong Kong and Macao, were moved to Shanghai Pudong International Airport when the latter opened in 1999. From October 2007, a limited number of international flights will commence from Hongqiao.

Almost all lines on the Shanghai Metro (with the exceptions of Lines 5, 6, 16, 17, and Pujiang) pass by Puxi.

Pudong and Puxi are connected by fourteen tunnels, four major bridges, and Lines 2, 4, 7, 8, 9, 10, 11, 12, 13, 14, and 18 on the Shanghai Metro.

The Shanghai railway station and Shanghai South railway station are also located in Puxi.

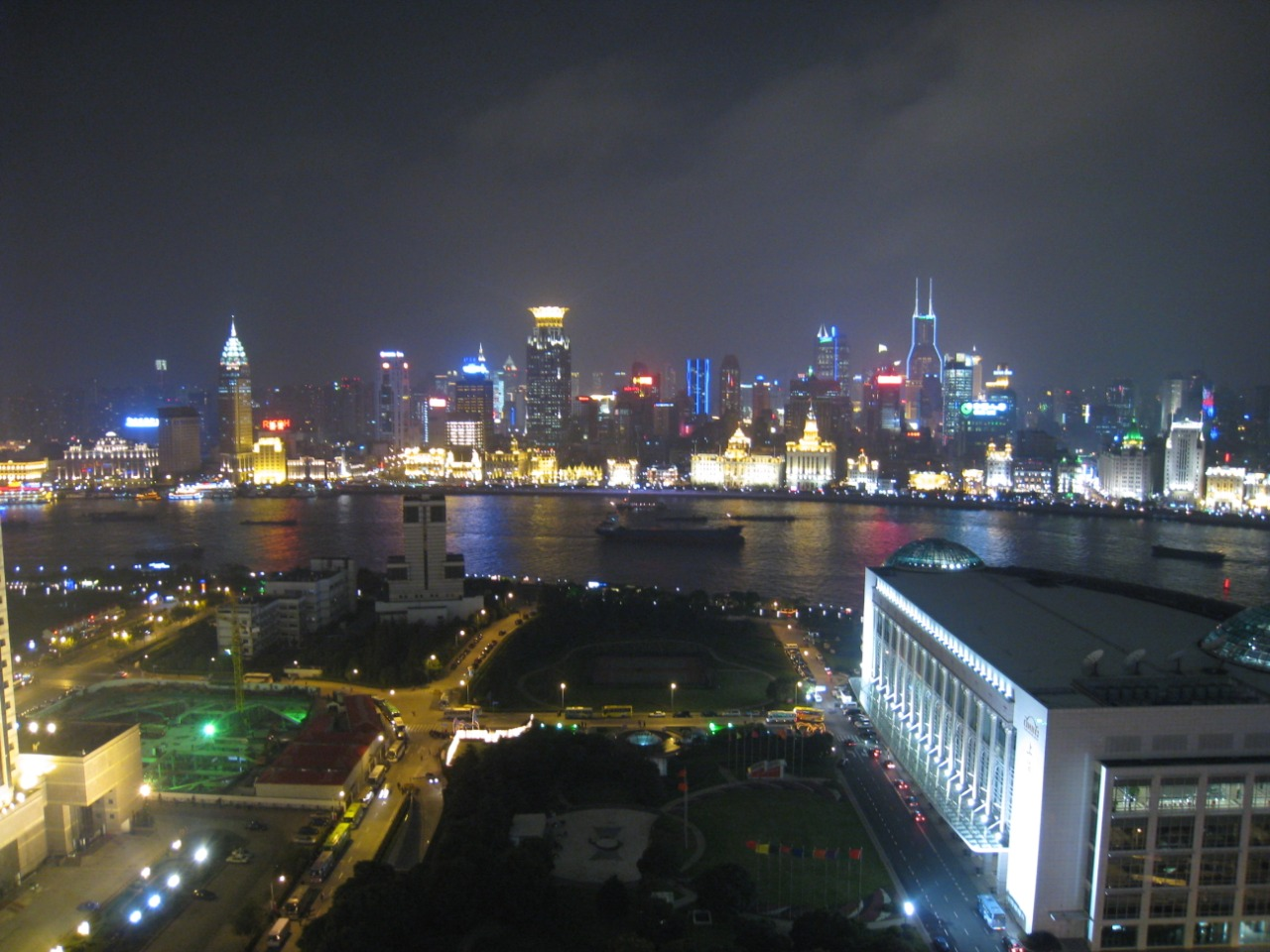
A view of the Puxi skyline, across the river from Pudong

The Nanpu Bridge which connects Puxi with Pudong

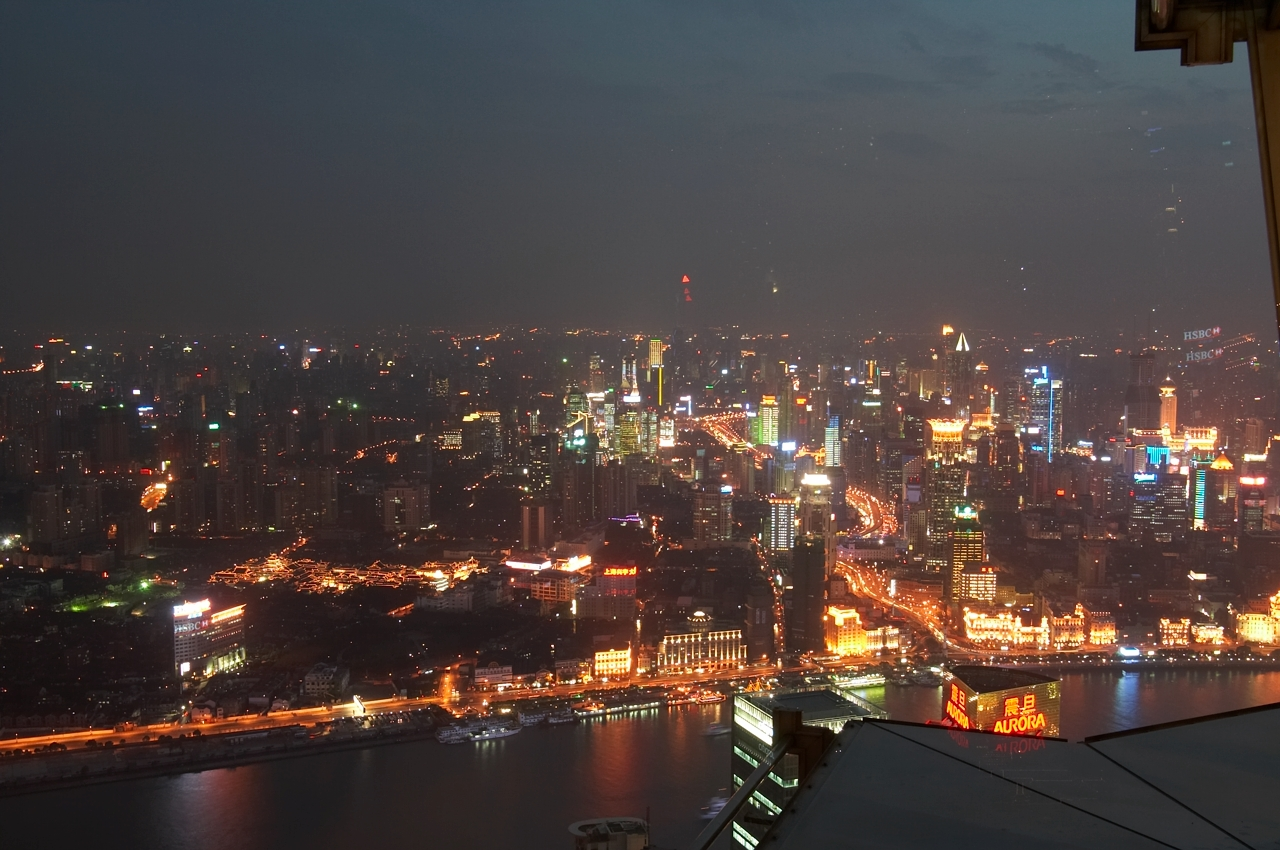
Puxi at night

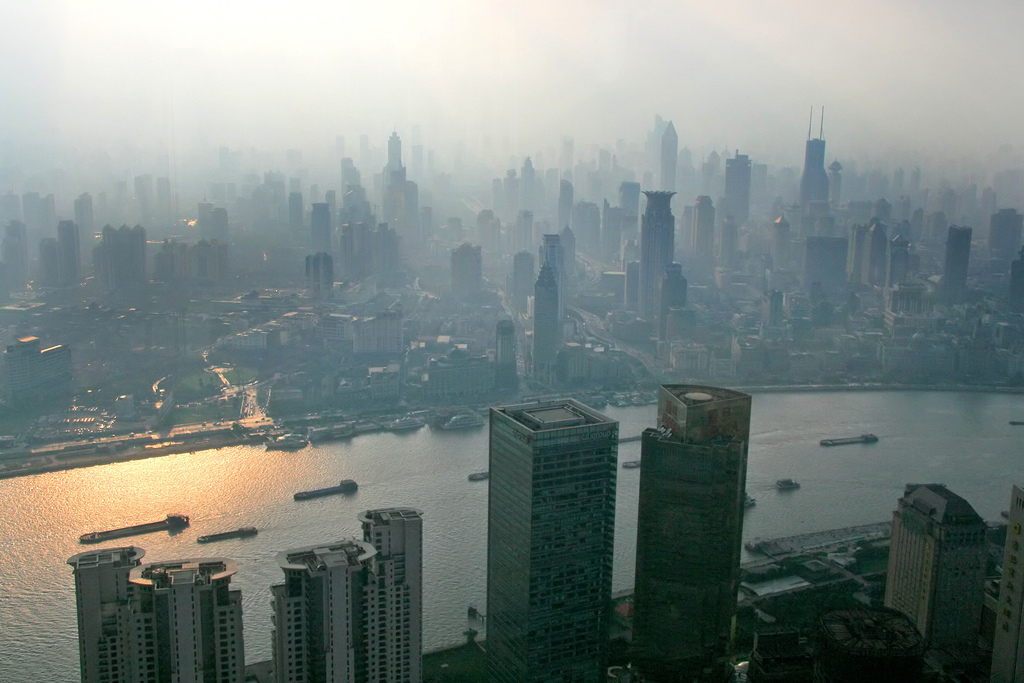
Puxi in morning

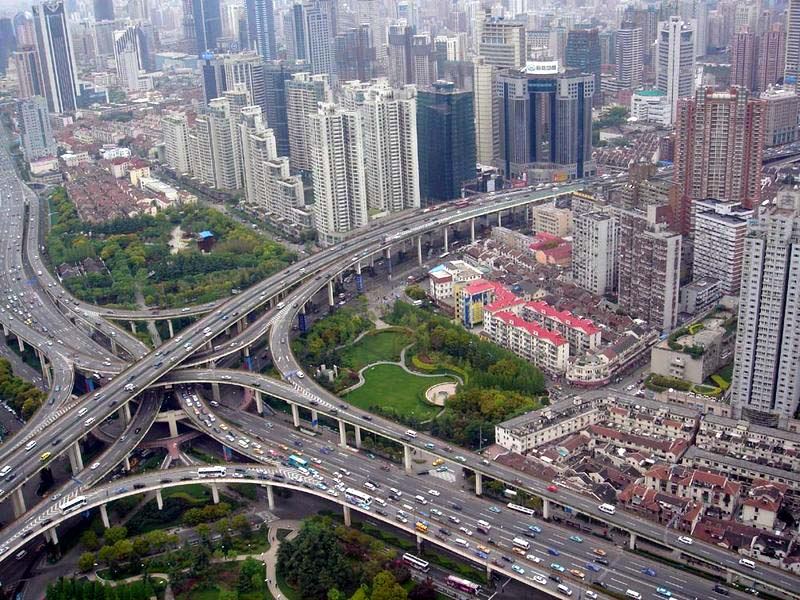
Complex viaducts in Puxi (Nanbei Elevated Road at Yanan Middle Road)
