= Nanpu Bridge =

Bridge in Shanghai, China

Nanpu Bridge 南浦大桥
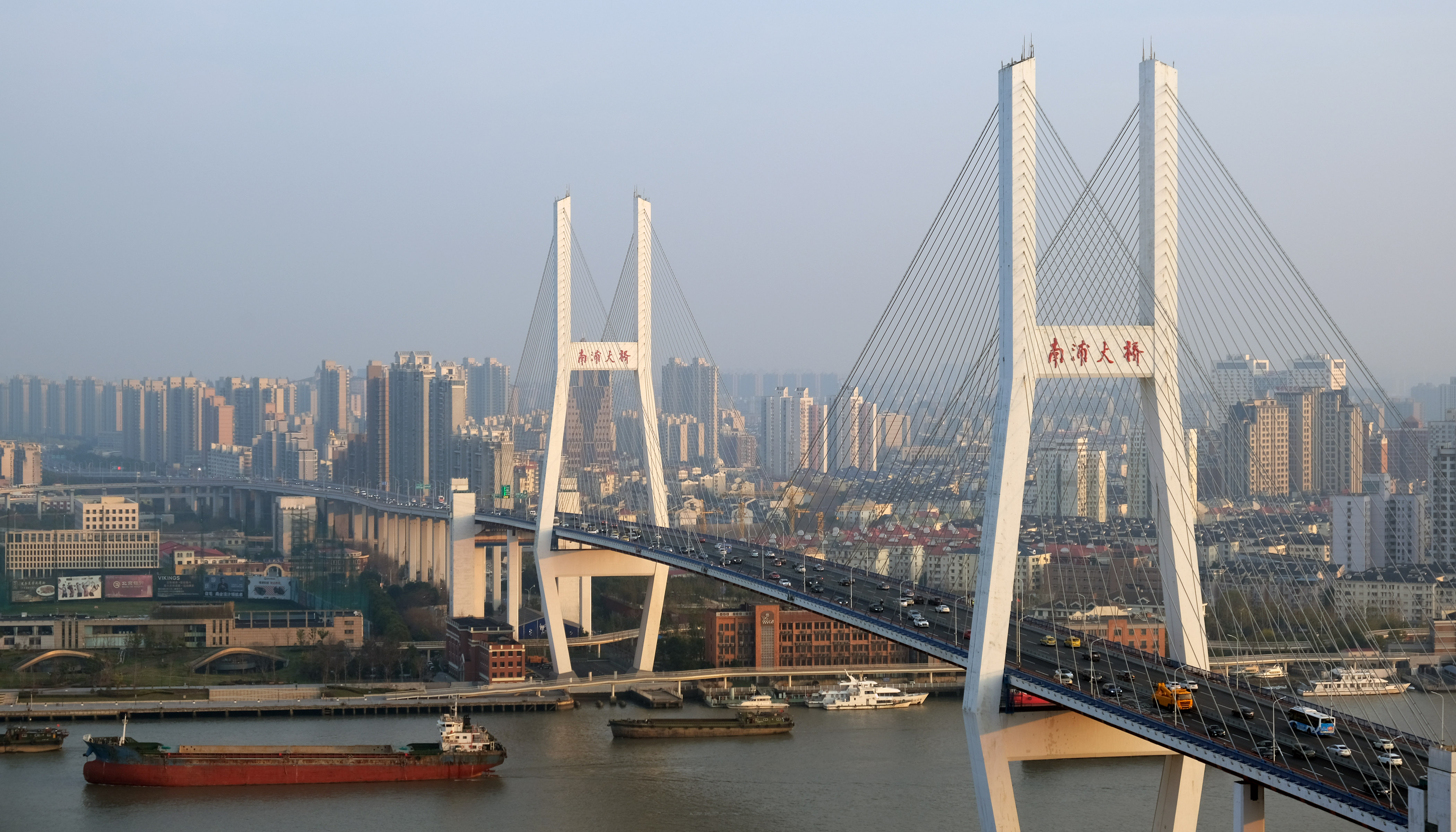
- Nanpu Bridge in 2020
- Coordinates: 31°12′27″N 121°30′03″E
- Carries: 7 lanes (road traffic)
- Crosses: Huangpu River
- Locale: Zhongqiu Jhiazhai, Shanghai, China
- Official name: Nanpu Dàqiáo

Characteristics
- Design: Cable-stayed bridge
- Total length: 8,359 metres (27,425 ft)
- Longest span: 423 metres (1,388 ft)

History
- Opened: 1991

Location
- Interactive map of Nanpu Bridge

The Nanpu Bridge (simplified Chinese: 南浦大桥; traditional Chinese: 南浦大橋; pinyin: Nánpǔ Dàqiáo), in Shanghai, China, sister bridge to the Yangpu Bridge, is one of the main bridges in Shanghai, forming part of Shanghai's elevated inner ring road.

The cable-stayed bridge was designed by the Shanghai Municipal Engineering Design Institute, Shanghai Urban Construction College, and Shanghai Urban Construction Design Institute, with assistance from Holger Svensson. The engineering of the bridge is noted as the start of modern long span cable-stayed bridge construction in China. The construction cost amounted to RMB 820 million.

It has a main span of 428 meters (1,388 ft), shorter than its sister bridge. It is the 57th longest cable-stayed bridge in the world, opened to the public in 1991.

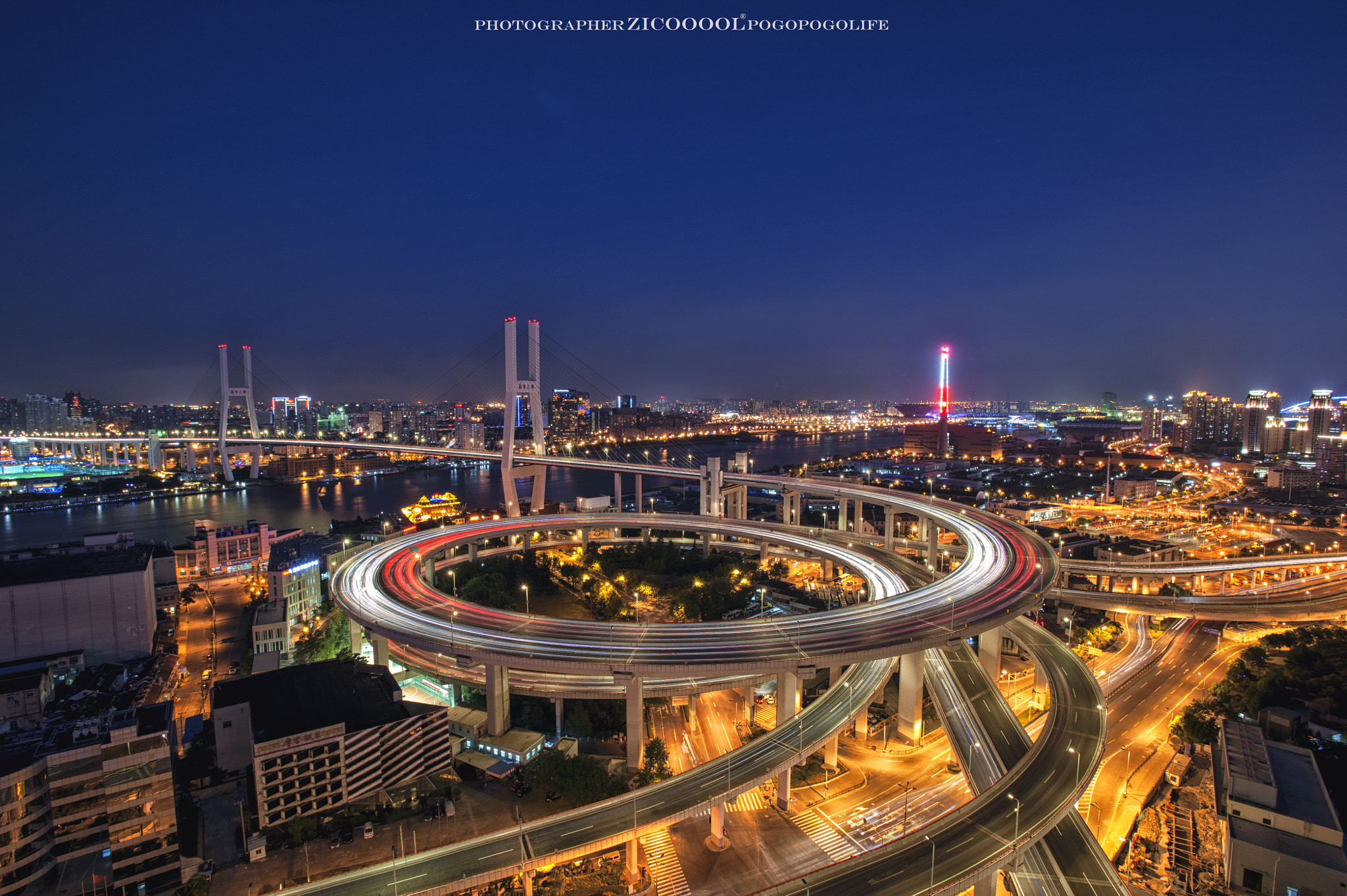
Nanpu Bridge spiral approach

The bridge's double spiral approach on the Puxi side was listed as the world's largest, with a diameter of 180 meter and a total distance of 7.5 km.
