= S20 Shanghai Outer Ring Expressway =

Road in Shanghai, China

Shanghai Outer Ring Expressway

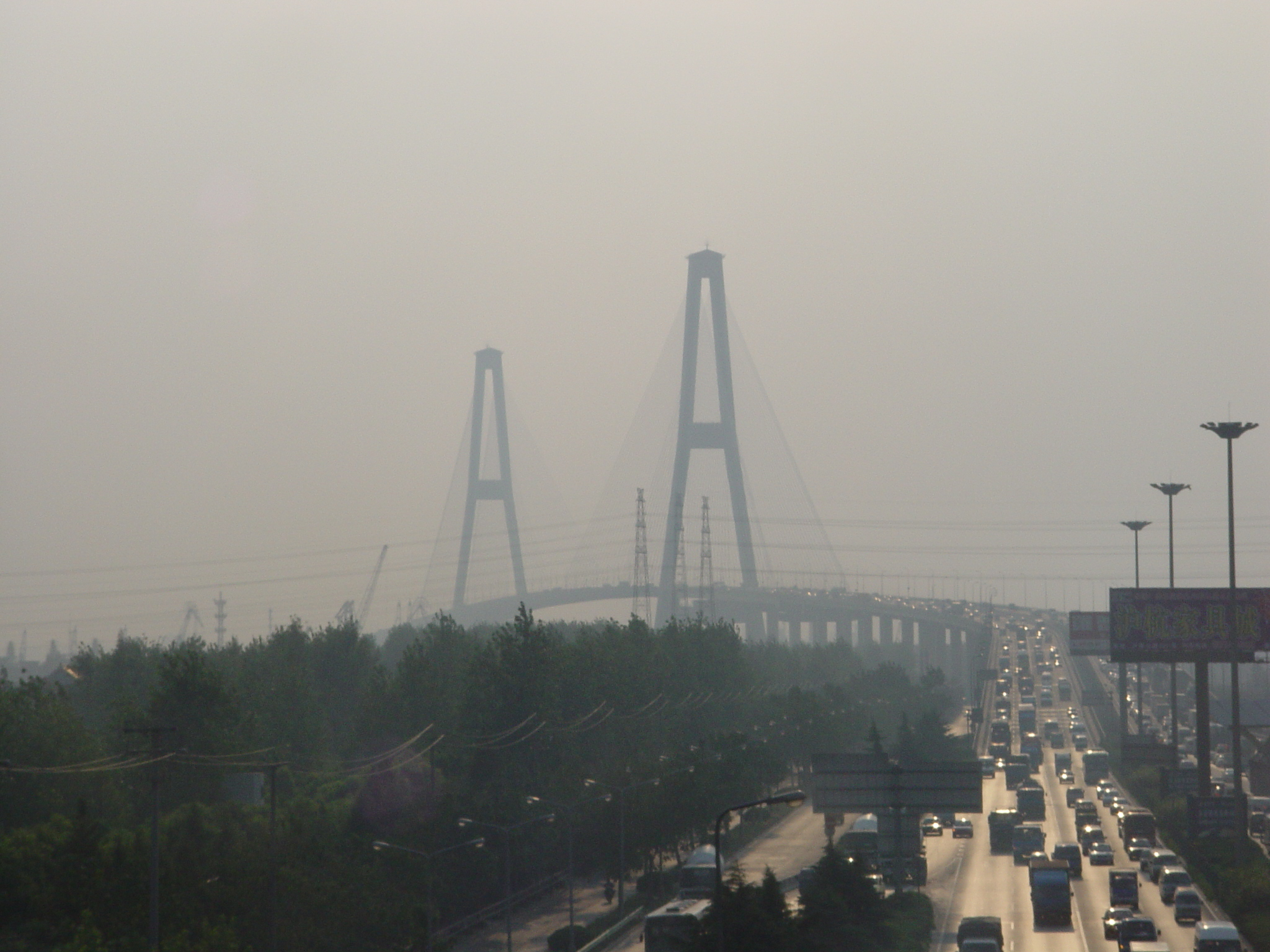
- Traffic on the Outer Ring Expressway at the Xupu Bridge.

Route information
- Length: 99 km (62 mi)
- Existed: 21 June 2003–present

Location
- Country: China
- Province: Shanghai

Highway system
- Transport in China

The Shanghai Outer Ring Expressway (Chinese: 上海外环高速公路), designated S20, is a ring expressway that surrounds the inner districts of the city of Shanghai, China.

The different sections of the road formerly had specific names in relation to the cardinal directions. For instance, the eastern portion of the expressway was named 上海环东一大道 (Huandong Avenue (No. 1), literally Eastern Ring No. 1 Avenue), the western portion of the expressway was named 上海环西一大道 (Huanxi Avenue (No. 1), literally Western Ring No. 1 Avenue), and so on.

The S20 expressway crosses the Huangpu River twice. At the southern end, it uses the Xupu Bridge, and at the northern end, it uses the Outer Ring Tunnel.

== See also ==
- Inner Ring Road (Shanghai): A ring road in downtown of Shanghai
- Middle Ring Road (Shanghai): Another ring road in Shanghai, located between the inner ring and the outer one.
