= Shunji Isaki =

- 伊崎 俊二
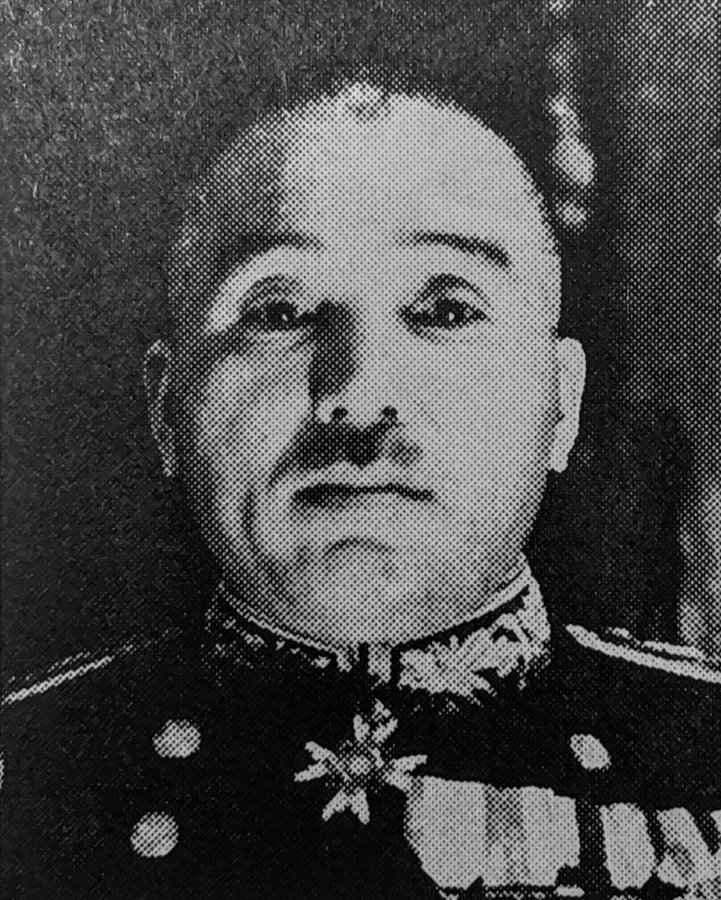
- Born: 5 February 1892; Fukuoka Prefecture, Japan
- Died: 12 July 1943 (aged 51); Kolombangara, Solomon Islands
- Military career
- Allegiance: Empire of Japan
- Branch: Imperial Japanese Navy
- Service years: 1914–1943
- Rank: Vice Admiral (posthumous)
- Commands: Nara, Kuri, Ashi, Asanagi, Yūnagi, Shikinami. Sendai, Mogami, Jintsu, Maya; 2nd Destroyer Squadron
- Conflicts: World War II; Battle of Kolombangara †

Shunji Isaki (伊崎 俊二, Isaki Shunji; 5 February 1892 – 12 July 1943) was an admiral in the Imperial Japanese Navy during World War II.

== Biography ==
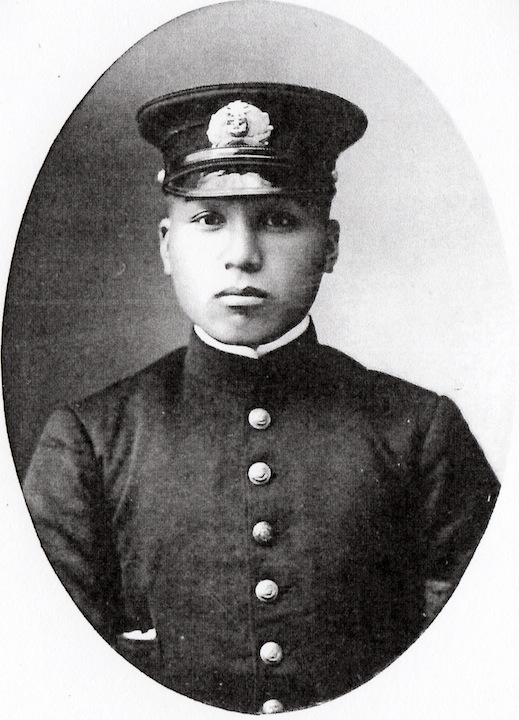
Shunji Isaki

Isaki was a native of Fukuoka prefecture, and a graduate of the 42nd class of the Imperial Japanese Navy Academy in 1914. He was ranked 23rd in a class of 117 cadets.

As midshipman, Isaki served on the Soya and Kashima. After his commissioning as sub-lieutenant on 13 December 1915, he was assigned to the Chikuma and Hirado, but did not participate in any combat operations during World War I.

After the war, he returned to school to study the latest techniques in naval artillery and torpedo warfare, and subsequently served on the Yamashiro, Yakumo and Hiei. As a lieutenant specializing in torpedoes, he then served on the Yubari and Sendai.

His first command was the destroyer Nara from 1 November 1926. Promoted to lieutenant commander a month later, he subsequently was captain of the Kuri, Ashi, Asanagi, and Yūnagi, and Shikinami. After his promotion to captain in 1936, he was reassigned to command the Sendai in 1938, followed by the Mogami, Jintsu, and Maya.

Isaki was promoted to rear admiral on 1 November 1942.

He commanded a destroyer squadron, DesRon2 from his flagship Jintsu during the Battle of Kolombangara against the Royal New Zealand Navy and the United States Navy on 12 July 1943. Although the battle was a victory for Japan, Jintsu was hit repeatedly by gunfire and torpedoes, destroying its bridge and killing Isaki.

Isaki was posthumously promoted to vice admiral.
