= Shanghai Ferry =

Ferry transport in Shanghai, China

Chinese name
- Simplified Chinese: 上海市轮渡
- Traditional Chinese: 上海市輪渡
- Literal meaning: Shanghai Ferry
Transcriptions
Standard Mandarin
- Hanyu Pinyin: Shànghǎi shì lúndù

Commonly abbreviated as
- Simplified Chinese: 市轮渡
- Traditional Chinese: 市輪渡
- Literal meaning: City ferry
Transcriptions
Standard Mandarin
- Hanyu Pinyin: Shì lúndù

Overview
- Owner: Shanghai Municipal Government
- Locale: Shanghai, China
- Number of lines: 18
- Daily ridership: 250,000 (2011 avg.)

Operation
- Began operation: 5 January 1911; 115 years ago
- Operator: Shanghai Ferry Company
System map
Part of a series on
Transport in Shanghai
- Roads
- Long Distance Rail
- Commuter Rail
- Maglev
- Metro
- Tram
- Trolleybus
- Bus
- Ferry
Long Distance
- Airports
  - SHA
  - PVG
- HSR
  - Huning
  - Jinghu
  - Coastal
  - Yangtze
  - Hukun
  - HuSuHu
  - HuSuTong
- Conventional Rail
  - Jinghu
  - Hukun
- Railway stations
  - Shanghai
  - Hongqiao
  - Shanghainan
  - Shanghaixi
  - Songjiang
Shanghai Suburban Railway
- Jinshan railway
- Airport Link line
Shanghai Metro
- 1 2 3 4 5 6 7 8 9 10 11 12
13 14 15 16 17 18 Pujiang
- Miscellanea
  - Trains
  - Stations
  - Timeline
Trams in Shanghai
- 1908-75
- Zhangjiang (Closed)
- Songjiang (T1
- T2)
Roads
- Municipal express roads
- Provincial expressways
- National expressways
- Yangtze River fixed crossing
Shanghai Public Transport Card

The Shanghai Ferry (Chinese: 上海市轮渡, abbr. 市轮渡) is a system of ferry routes across the Huangpu River in Shanghai. The ferry service started on January 5, 1911, by the municipal authorities in Pudong. Before the 1970s, the ferry service was the only way to cross the Huangpu River. In the 1980s, the Shanghai Ferry became one of the busiest ferry services in the world. In the 1990s, as bridges and tunnels across the Huangpu river were built, the ferry service saw a sharp drop in ridership. The Shanghai Ferry currently consists of 18 ferry lines and is operated by the state-owned Shanghai Ferry Company.

== History ==
=== Before the creation of the ferry service ===
Before the Shanghai ferry service was created, private sampan ferries were the main way to cross the Huangpu River. Most sampan ferries could only carry around 30-50 passengers and a one-way trip across the river would take around 30 minutes. As the city grew, the demand for cross-river traffic increased rapidly. In addition, increasing number of large vessels and the strong currents on the river posed extra dangers for traditional sampan ferries. Accidents involving sampan ferries were on the rise.

In 1909, Pudong Embankment Rehabilitation Bureau, a semi-official autonomous municipal administration, dredged several tributaries of the Huangpu River. To help the workers commute across the river, the Pudong authorities rent a steamboat to ferry workers between the Tongren Pier (near the Bund at East Beijing Road) and Donggou in Pudong. Since the number of workers taking the ferry was far below the ferry's capacity, the authorities would also admit other passengers along the way, charging a small fee to subsidise the operation costs. As the steamboat was much safer and faster than other means to cross the river such as sampan ferries, taking the steamboat became the preferred way for people to cross the river. Meanwhile, the authorities realised that the ferry revenues can cover the renting cost. The authorities therefore decided to make its steamboat ferry service permanent

=== Development of the ferry service ===
On January 15, 1911, the Pudong municipal authorities launched a ferry line between Tongren Pier and Donggou. In 1917, another ferry line linking Tongren Pier to Xidu was launched. Two years later, the authorities launched a ferry line between Tongren Pier and Xigou (Qingningsi). Around the same time, private ferry companies also started to launch commercial ferry lines.

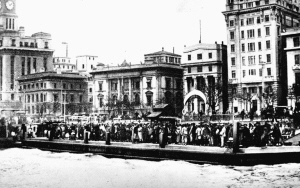
The Tongren pier in the 1920s

In 1927, the ownership of the Pudong ferry service was transferred to the newly established Shanghai Special Municipality. By 1935, the ferry service operated 6 lines across the Huangpu river with 9 steel floating docks, 6 wooden docks, 12 ferry boats, and 5026 seats. The annual ridership reached 12.98 million. Before the Second Sino-Japanese War in 1937, the Shanghai Ferry, consisting of mainly government-run ferry lines as well as private ferry lines, became the main way to cross the Huangpu River.

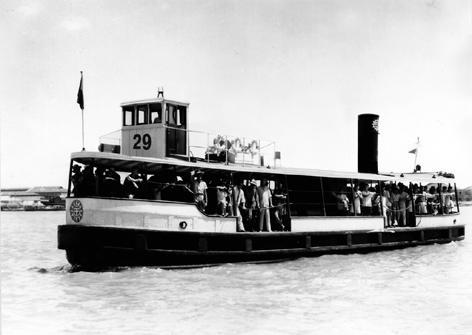
A Shanghai Ferry sailing on the Huangpu River before 1949

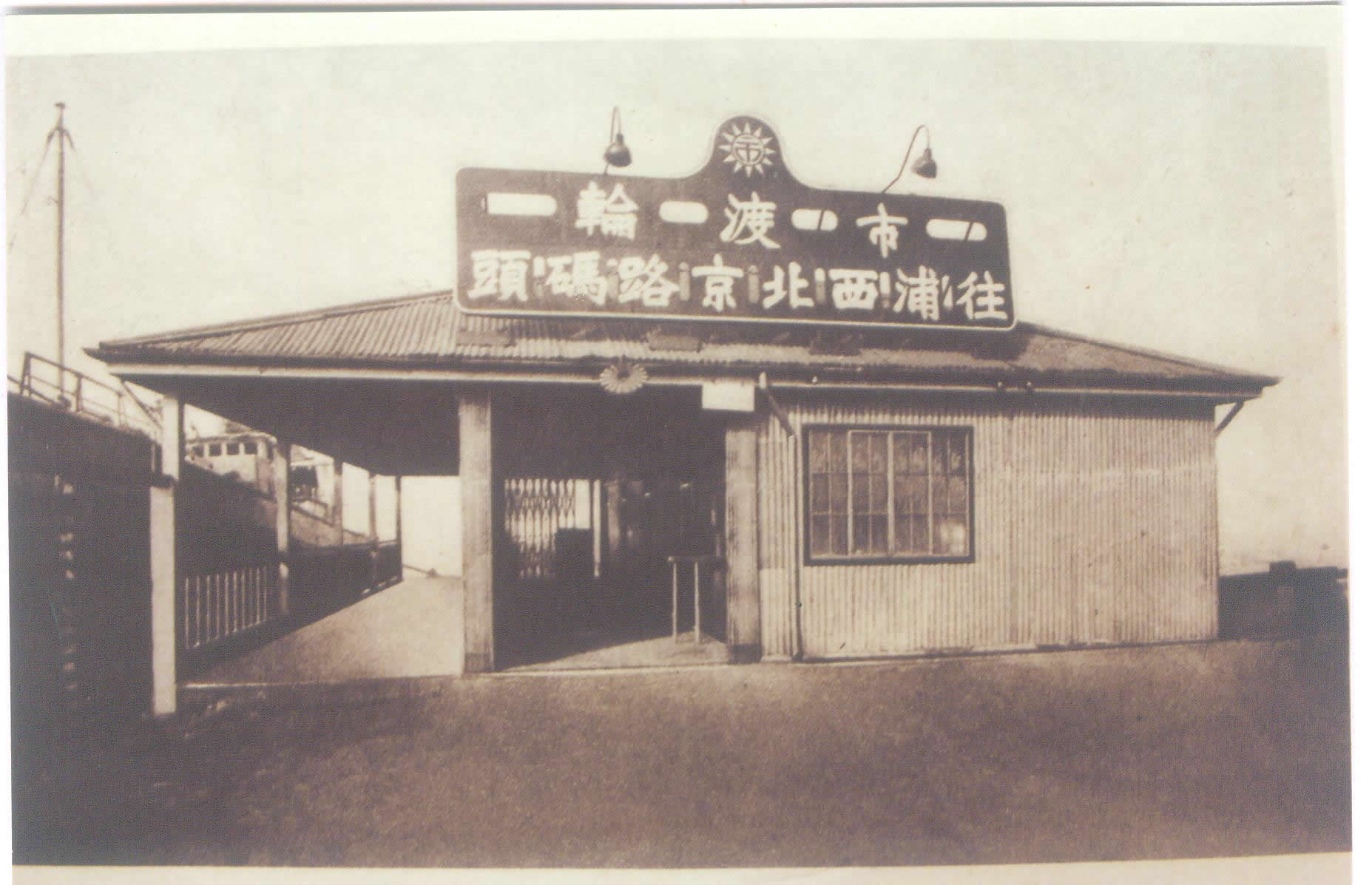
Dongchang Road Ferry terminal, before 1949

The Shanghai Ferry service was reduced to 3 lines due to the Second Sino-Japanese War. By 1945, the Shanghai ferry fleet had been reduced to 2 long ferries, both leased out, and 3 standard ferries unable to put in service due to broken engines. In March 1947, the Shanghai Ferry Company was established as a joint venture between the government and various private ferry companies and original ferry lines were being restored. By 1949, the Shanghai Ferry Company operated 4 ferry lines across the river, one long-haul ferry route, and one ferry route for automobiles with 19 ferry boats, 13 steel floating docks, and 2 wooden docks.

Shortly after the Communist takeover of Shanghai, the military administration of Shanghai requisitioned the Shanghai Ferry Company on December 28, 1949. In 1956, the Communist government nationalised the ferry industry of Shanghai, abolishing traditional private sampan ferries and acquiring new ferry boats to launch new lines.

Before the 1970s, the ferry service was the only way to cross the Huangpu River. In the 1980s, the Shanghai Ferry became one of the busiest ferry services in the world. In 1993, the Shanghai Ferry Company operated 21 lines with a daily ridership of 1 million and an annual ridership of 3700 million. In the 1990s, the Shanghai government built several tunnels and bridges across the Huangpu River, such as the Nanpu Bridge, the Yangpu Bridge, and the East Fuxing Road Tunnel. As a result, some ferry lines were discontinued due to sharp drops in ridership. By 2011, the Shanghai Ferry Company operated 18 ferry lines and 55 ferry boats with a daily ridership of 250,000.

On January 29, 2018, the new Shanghai 1 and Shanghai 2 entered to the fleet of Shanghai Ferry, and started to operate since February 1. All standard ferries will retired on the same day.

=== 1987 Shanghai stampede ===
The deadliest accident of the Shanghai Ferry happened on December 12, 1987. Heavy fog on that day resulted in a suspension of ferry service at Lujiazui Ferry Terminal, where passengers started to gather up. The ferry service restored at 9 am. When the second ferry arrived at 9:10 am, anxious passengers pushed towards the ferry boat. An estimated 30,000-40,000 passengers (many with bicycles) had queued for the ferry. The passengers became anxious from the waiting and began to push towards the second ferry, after the first had departed. People and bicycles began to fall into the river from the pushing and the scene quickly turned chaotic. The station was closed 5 minutes later in order to disperse the crowd and commence rescue operations.

The disaster killed 17 people, severely injured 2 and injured over 70 people. It was the deadliest stampede to occur in Shanghai before the stampede in 2014. Another casualty report stated that 66 were killed, 2 severely injured and over 20 slightly injured.

== Lines ==
Lines	Lines (in Chinese)	Terminal in Puxi	Terminal in Puxi (in Chinese)	Operation Hours	Terminal in Pudong	Terminal in Pudong (in Chinese)	Operation Hours	Interval (minutes)
Sansong Line	三淞线	Wusong	吴淞	6:00-21:00	Sanchagang	三岔港	5:50-20:45	20/30
Caolin Line	草临线	Linjiang Rd	临江路	6:00-20:30	Caozhen	草镇	5:50-20:35	20/40
Dongnen Line	东嫩线	Nenjiang Rd	嫩江路	5:30-21:20	Dongtang Rd	东塘路	5:40-21:30	10/15/20/30
Nanlu Line	南陆线	Lujiabang Rd	陆家浜路	24 hours	Nanmatou	南码头	24 hours	12/24/30/Irregular intervals at night
Tangmi Line	塘米线	Mishidu	米市渡	6:30-18:30	Tangkou	塘口	6:45-18:35	30 (Under renovation)
Jinding Line	金定线	Dinghaiqiao	定海桥	24 hours	Jinqiao	金桥	24 hours	10/20/30/Irrgular intervals at Night
Xiening Line	歇宁线	Ningguo Rd	宁国路	6:40-18:20	Xiepu Rd	歇浦路	6:50-18:30	20/30
Mindan Line	民丹线	Dandong Rd	丹东路	5:00-22:00	Minsheng Rd	民生路	5:10-21:50	10/20
Qiqin Line	其秦线	Qinhuangdao Rd	秦皇岛路	24 hours	Qichangzhan	其昌栈	24 hours	10/20/30/Irrgular intervals at Night
Taigong Line	泰公线	Gongping Rd	公平路	7:00-19:00	Taidong Rd	泰同栈	7:00-18:50	10/20
Dongjin Line	东金线	East Jinling Rd	金陵东路	7:00-22:00	Dongchang Rd	东昌路	7:00-22:00	15
Dongfu Line	东复线	East Fuxing Rd	复兴东路	6:00-19:00	Dongchang Rd	东昌路	6:00-18:45	15
Yangfu Line	杨复线	East Fuxing Rd	复兴东路	5:00-23:00	Yangjiadu	杨家渡	5:10-22:50	10/20
Tangdong Line	塘董线	Dongjiadu	董家渡	6:20-18:00	Tangqiao	塘桥	6:30-18:10	20/30
Sangang Line	三港线	Gangkou	港口	5:00-23:00	Sanlin Rd	三林路	5:10-23:05	10/20/30
Chenche Line	陈车线	Chegouqiao	车沟桥	5:50-18:30	Chenhang	陈行	6:00-18:35	20/30
Duwu Line	杜吴线	Wujing	吴泾	5:00-19:00	Duhang Ferry Pier	杜行	5:15-19:08	30
Ximin Line	西闵线	Minhang Ferry Pier	闵行	4:00-0:00	Xidu Ferry Pier	西渡	4:10-00:05	15/20/30

== Fares ==
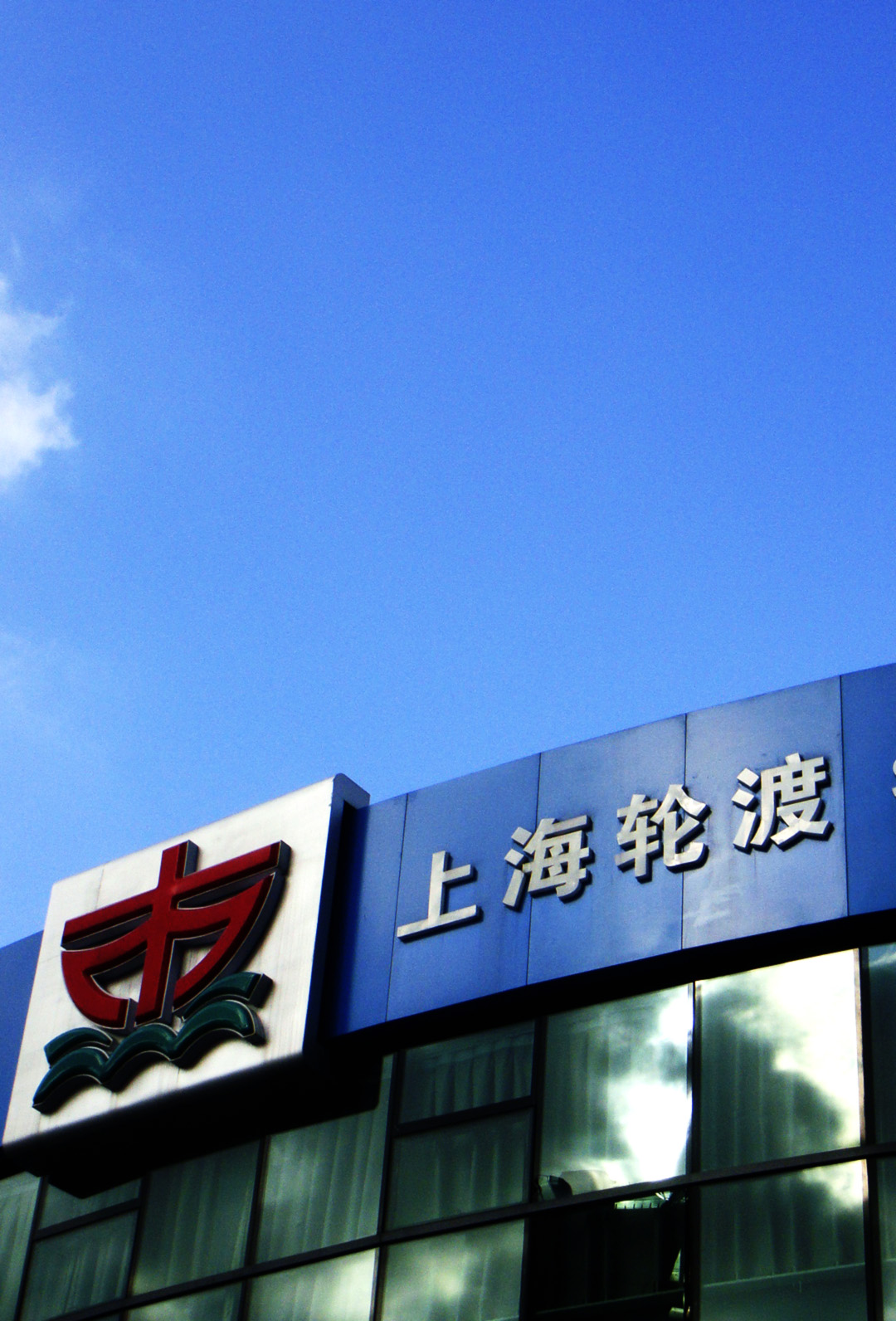
Logo of Shanghai Ferry at Fuxing Road Ferry Terminal

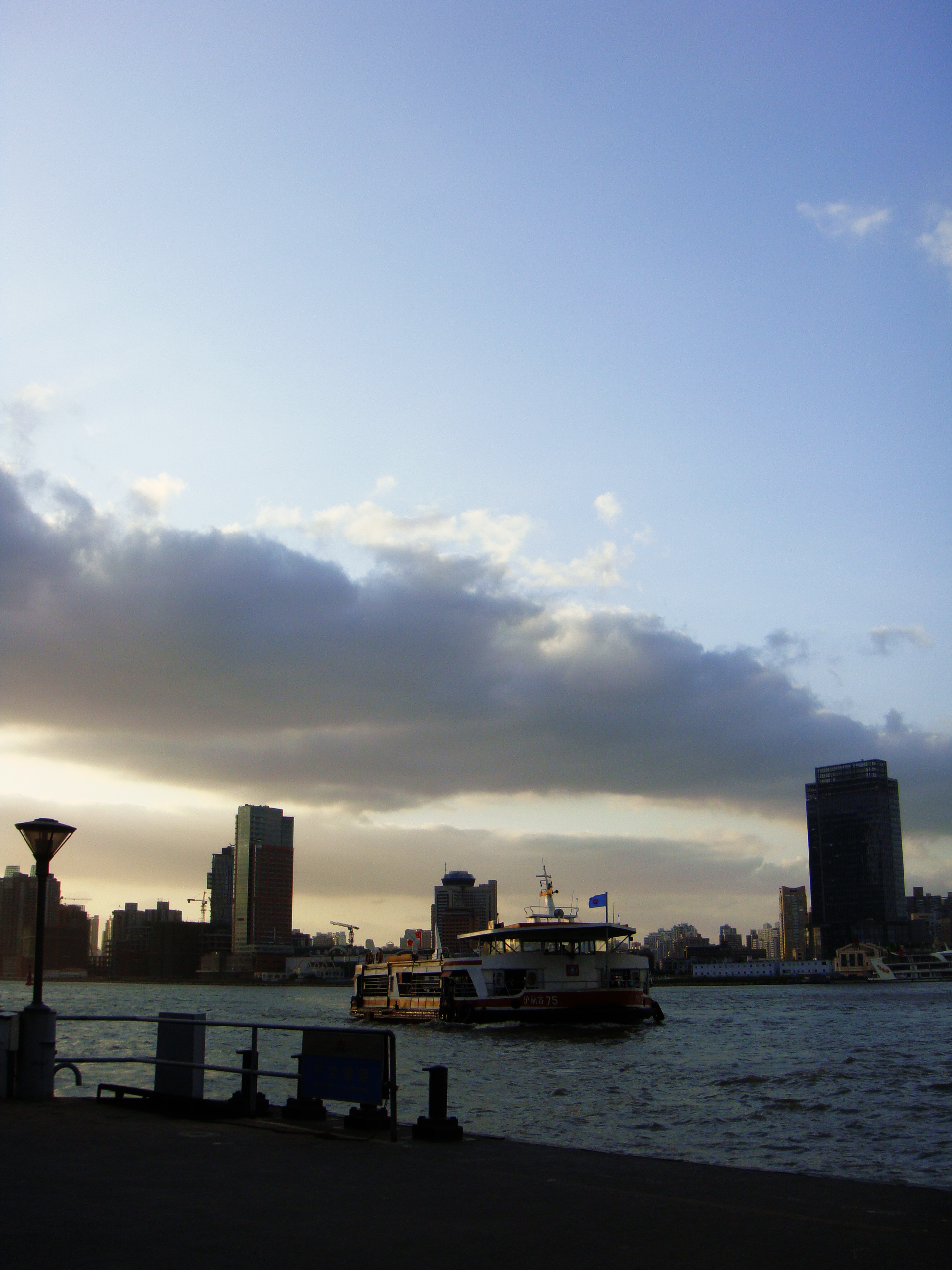
A ferry boat entering Qichangzhan Ferry Terminal

Shanghai ferry service has different fare categories for 8 types of passengers.

Type of passenger	Monthly token
Passengers	RMB 2.00
Bicycles	RMB 2.80
Light motorcycles	RMB 3.00
Motorcycles	RMB 4.00

Discounts on Shanghai Ferry are available to holders of the Shanghai Public Transport Card. Ferry discounts are separate from other public transport discounts. According to the website of the Shanghai Ferry company:

- Standard ferry discount: holders of the Shanghai Public Transport Card enjoy a 20% discount from the 21st to 60th ride in one month. Normal fares would apply from the 61st ride to the 80th ride, and the discounted fares would apply again from the 81st ride to the 120th ride, so on and so forth.
- Air-conditioned ferry discounts: holders of the Shanghai Public Transport Card enjoy a 1 RMB-off discount on the second ride of an air-conditioned ferry in one day.

== Gallery ==
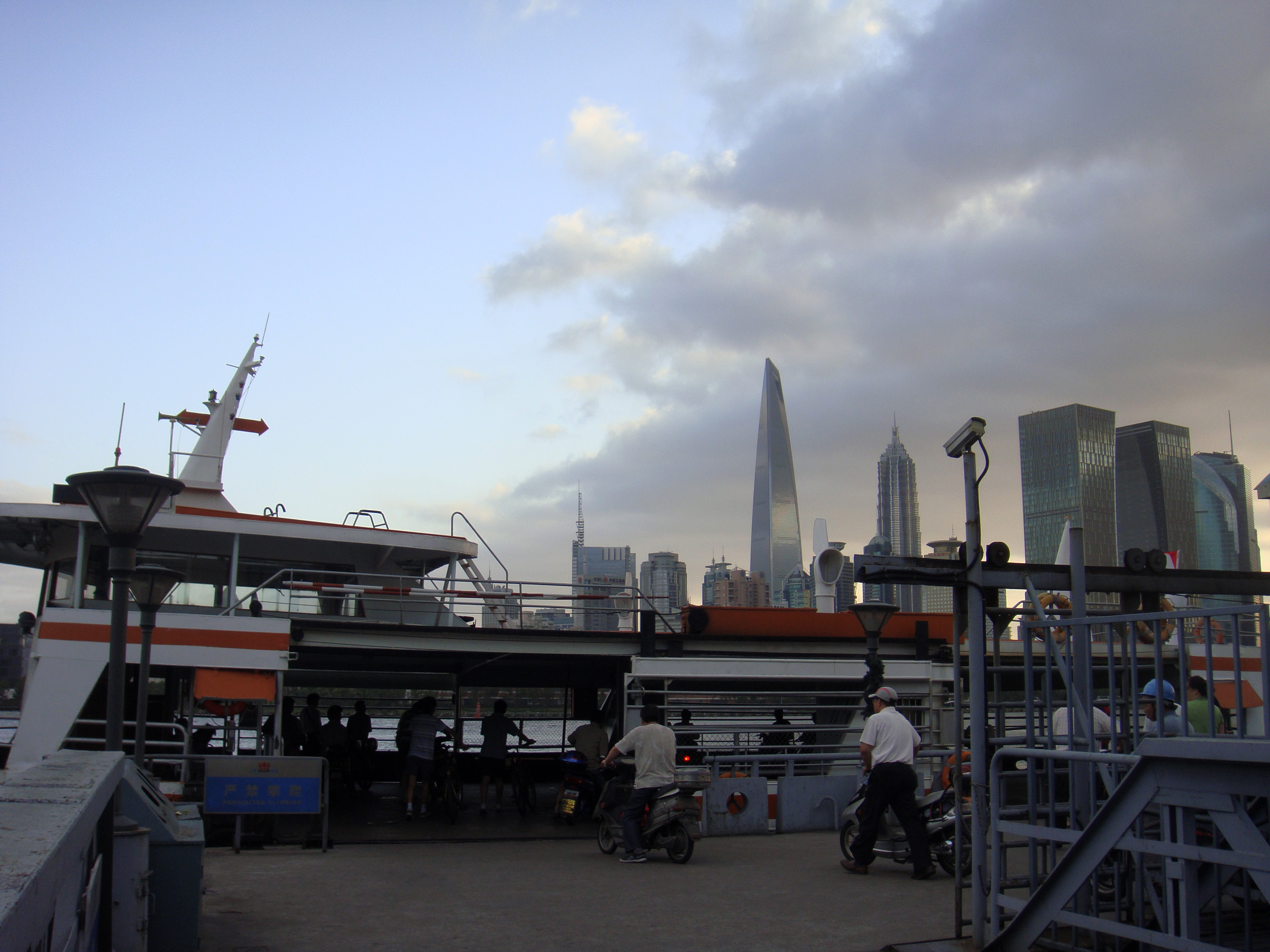
Passengers waiting at the Qinhuangdao Rd Ferry terminal

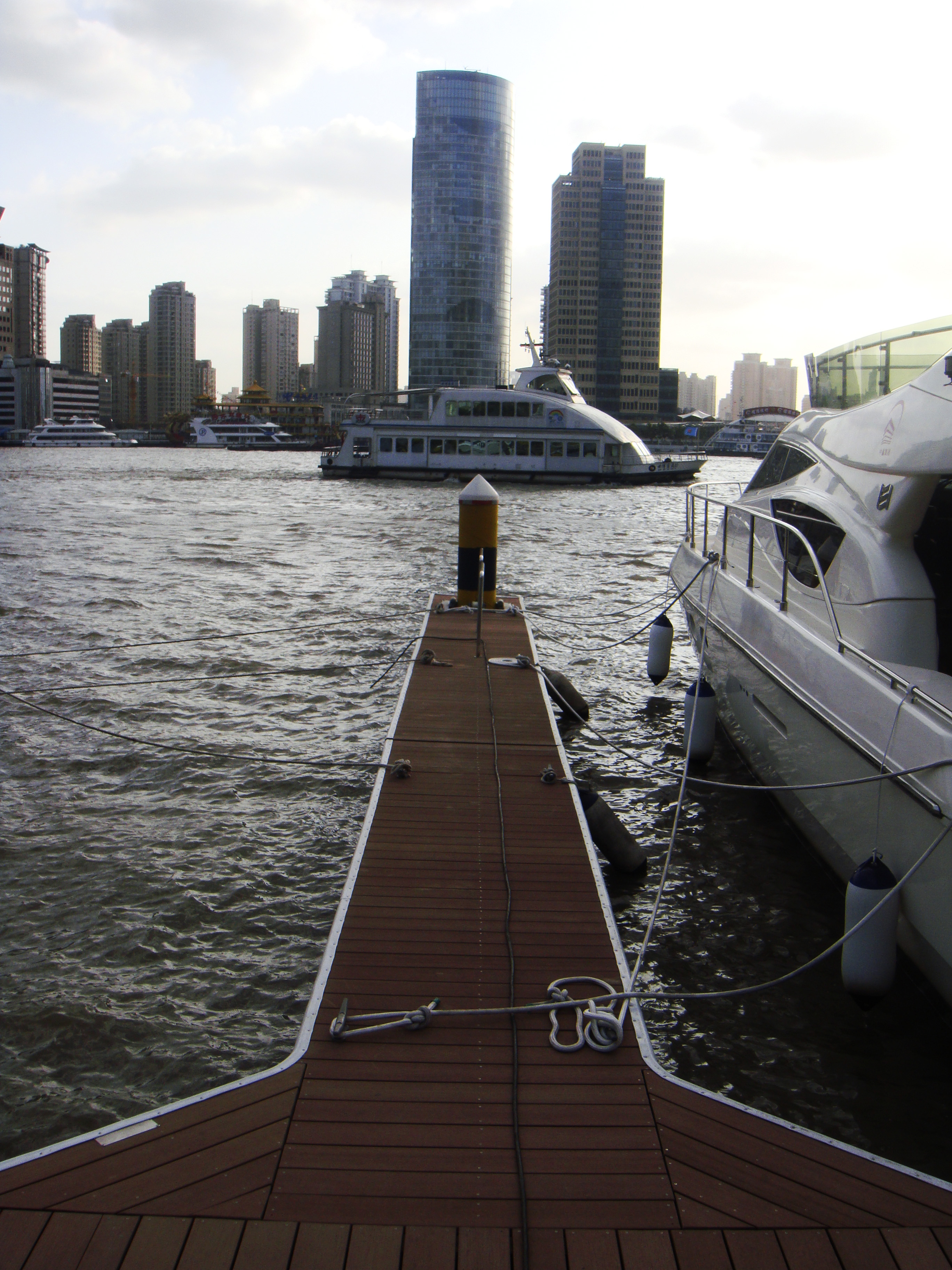
An air-conditioned ferry sailing on the Huangpu River

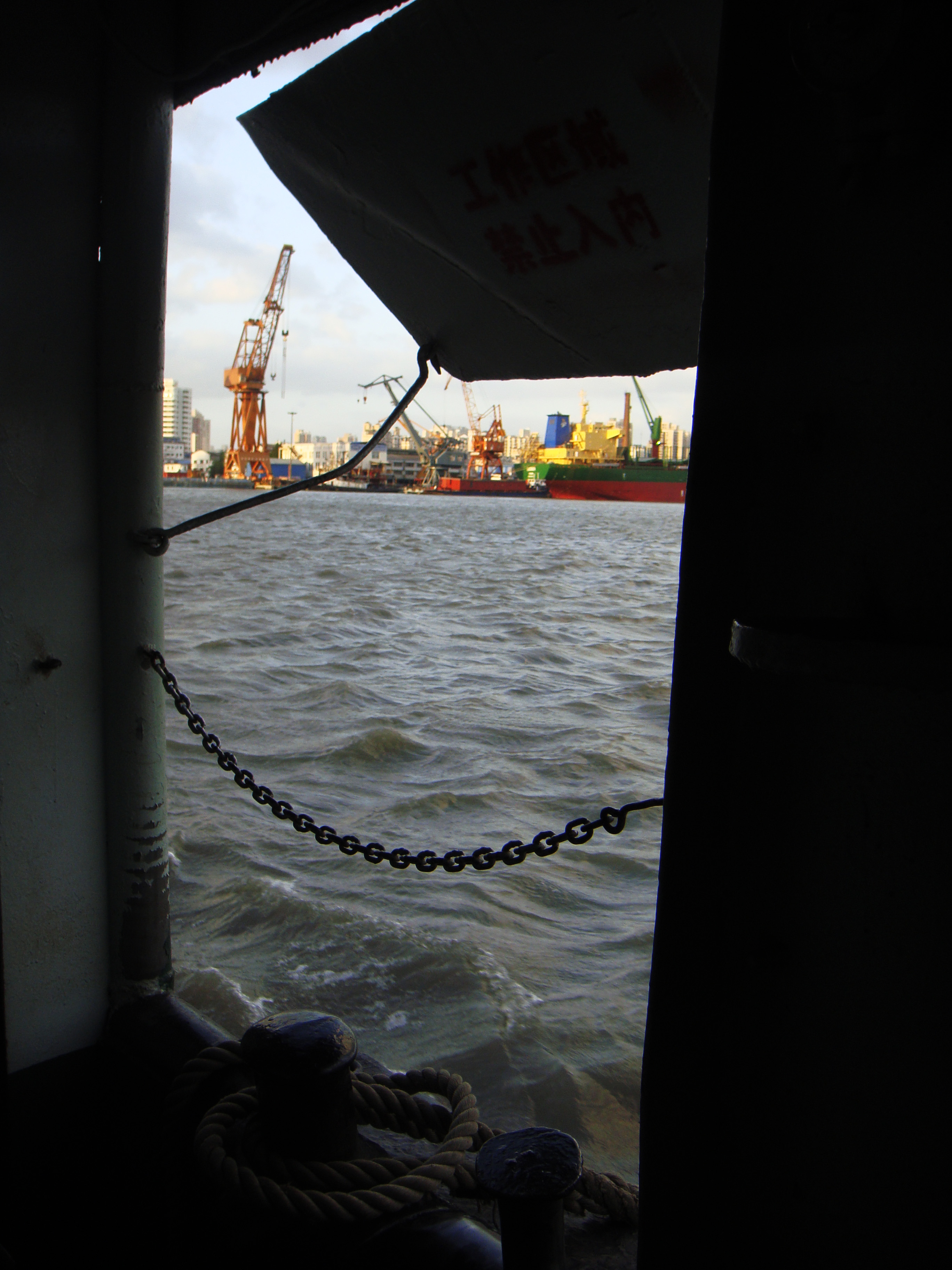
Inside the cockpit of a Shanghai ferry

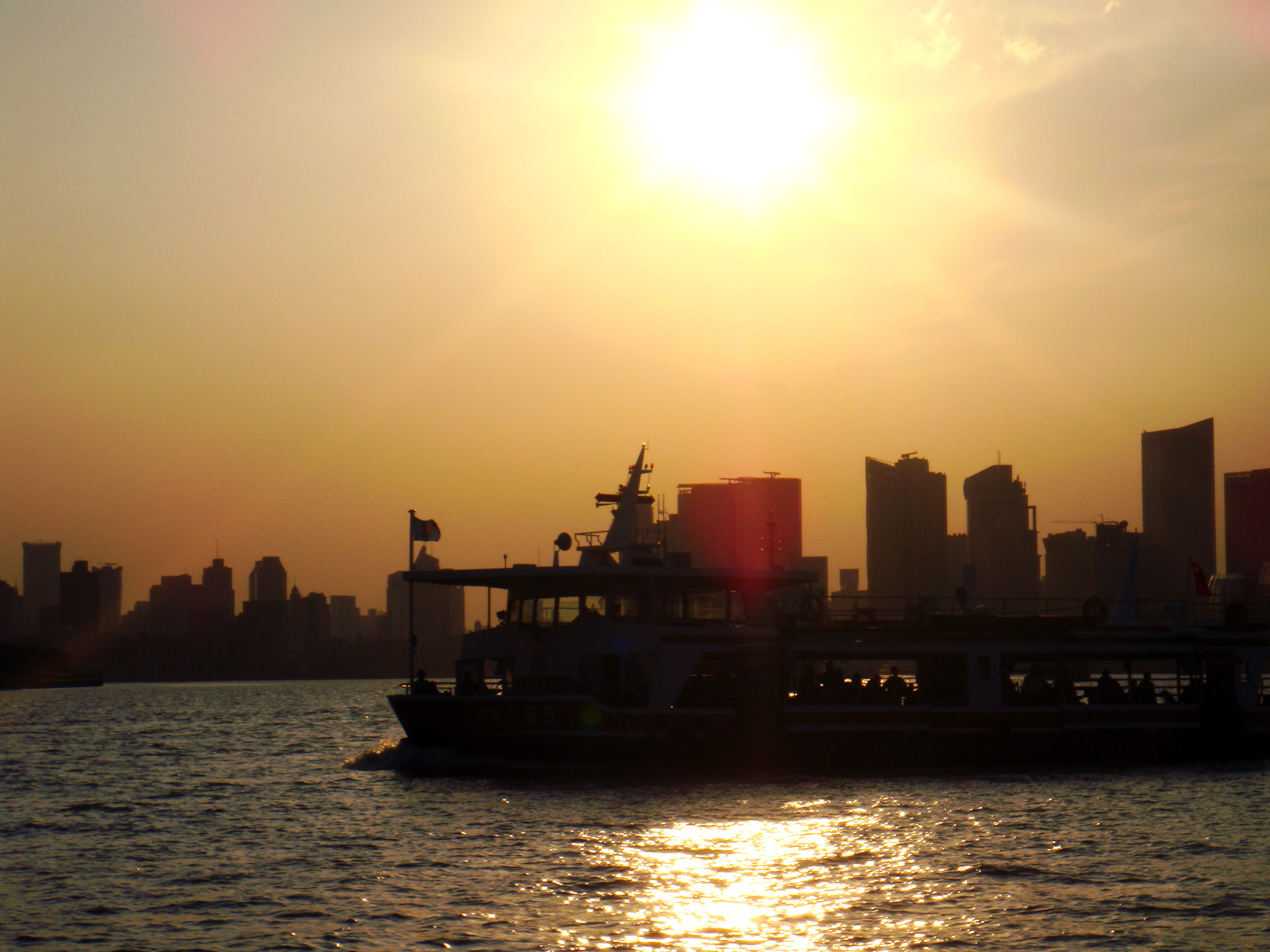
A ferry sailing towards Qichangzhan Ferry terminal

== International ferry service ==
There is a weekly ferry between Osaka in Japan and Shanghai in China with a duration of 48 hours. Shanghai Ferry utilises the vessel Su Zhou Hao. Built in 1992, the ferry is 155 metres in length, can carry up to 272 passengers and travels around 21 knots.
