= Thomas J. Ryan (admiral) =

US Navy admiral and Medal of Honor recipient (1901–1970)

Thomas John Ryan Jr.
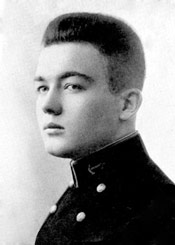
- US Naval Academy photo of Thomas J. Ryan
- Born: August 5, 1901; New Orleans, Louisiana
- Died: January 28, 1970 (aged 68)
- Burial place: Arlington National Cemetery
- Military career
- Allegiance: United States of America
- Branch: United States Navy
- Service years: 1921–1950
- Rank: Rear Admiral
- Unit: Third Fleet
- Conflicts: World War II: Solomon Islands campaign; Invasion of New Georgia; Battle of Kolombangara; Battle off Horaniu
- Awards: Medal of Honor; Navy Cross

Rear Admiral Thomas John Rya, Jr. (August 5, 1901 – January 28, 1970) was a career American naval officer who received the Medal of Honor, the United States' highest military decoration, for his actions while in Yokohama, Japan during the 1923 Great Kantō earthquake. Ryan went on to serve in World War II as a destroyer flotilla commander.

== Early life ==
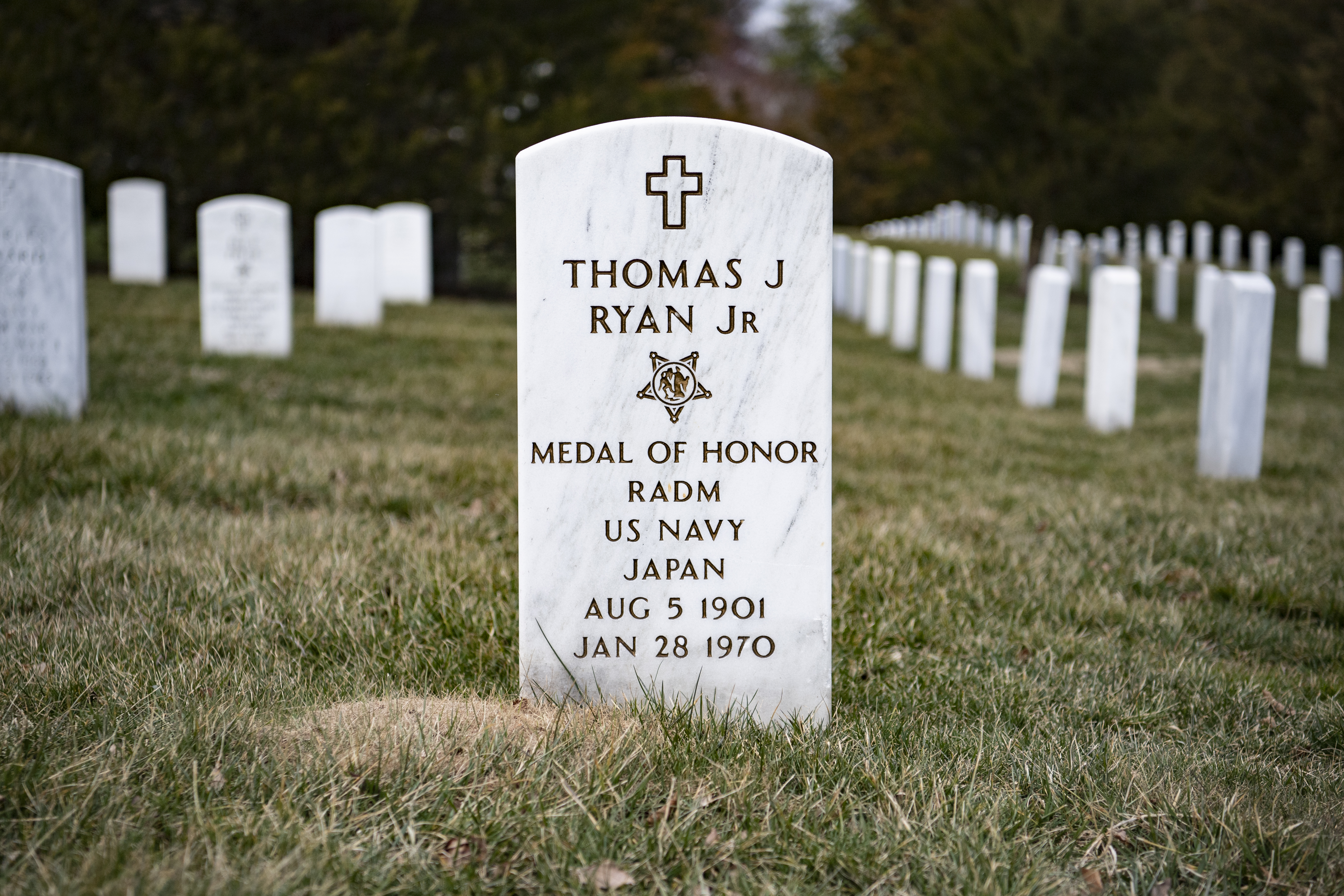
Grave at Arlington National Cemetery

Ryan was a 1921 graduate of the United States Naval Academy at Annapolis, Maryland. While an ensign, he was in Yokohama, Japan during the 1923 Great Kantō earthquake, during which he saved a woman, Mrs. Slack, from the burning Grand Hotel. This action earned Ryan the Medal of Honor, making him one of 18 men to receive the Medal of Honor during the interwar period from 1920 to 1940. Ryan was presented the Medal of Honor by President Calvin Coolidge at the White House on March 15, 1924.

== World War II ==
During World War II, Captain Ryan served as a destroyer flotilla commander in the South Pacific while part of the Third Fleet under the command of Admiral William "Bull" Halsey and saw action during the Solomon Islands campaign. He commanded the destroyer screen which supported the invasion of New Georgia in 1943, assisting the American landings on Rendova Island on June 30, by knocking out Japanese shore batteries. In the Battle of Kolombangara two weeks later on July 12–13, he was in command of the rear echelon of destroyers as part of Rear Admiral Walden L. Ainsworth's Task Force 18. A torpedo fired from one of Ryan's destroyers during the battle may have hit the Japanese cruiser Jintsu, which was sunk during the battle.

A month later, on August 17–18, Ryan led a group of destroyers which engaged a Japanese flotilla composed of destroyers, barges, and other light vessels under Captain Matsuji Ijuin which were attempting to reinforce the island of Horaniu near Vella Lavella. Although Ryan succeeded in forcing the escorting enemy destroyers to retreat, most of the barge transports escaped. After lying low the next day, on August 19, these barges landed a force of 390 Japanese on Horaniu, who succeeded in establishing a barge base. However, this base was later captured by the Americans on September 14.

== Navy Cross citations ==
As a result of his actions in the Pacific in 1943, President Roosevelt issued two Navy Cross medals to Ryan in January, 1944, citing his "extraordinary heroism and distinguished service in his line of profession as Commander," one for protecting landing infantry movements during the Battle of Rendova, and the other for his contributions to the sinking of at least four enemy ships.

== Postwar ==
After the end of the war, Ryan served as the trial judge advocate (prosecutor) in late 1945 during the court-martial of Charles B. McVay III. McVay, who had graduated from the Naval Academy a year ahead of Ryan in 1920, had been a friend of his for 25 years. He was the captain of the heavy cruiser USS Indianapolis, which had been torpedoed and sunk by the Japanese submarine I-58 on July 30, 1945. McVay was convicted of "hazarding his ship by failing to zigzag", but was exonerated more than 50 years later in October 2000.

Ryan went on to reach the rank of rear admiral. He died on January 28, 1970, and is buried at Arlington National Cemetery, in Arlington, Virginia.

== Medal of Honor citation ==
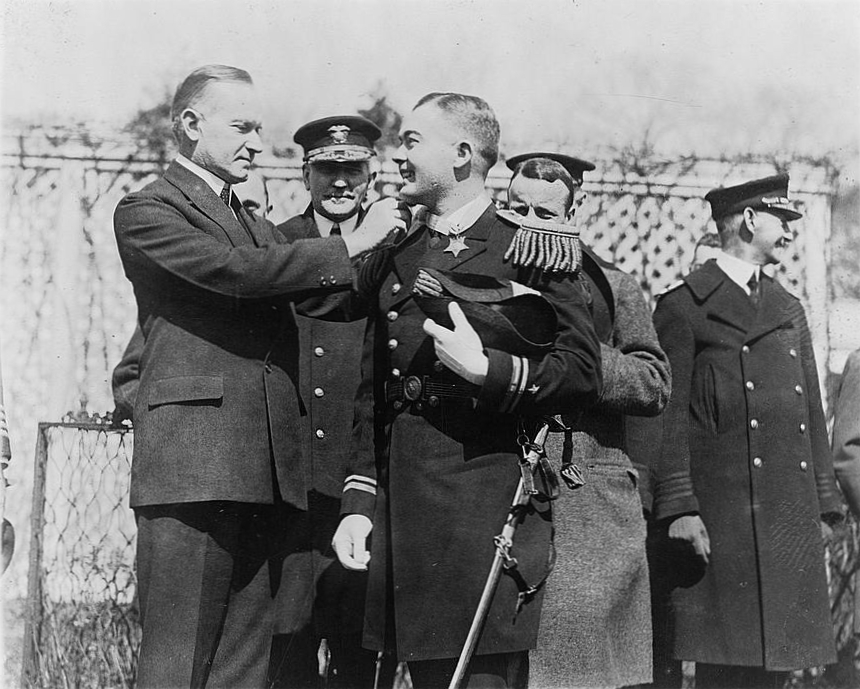
Ryan receiving the Medal of Honor from President Calvin Coolidge, March 15, 1924

His citation reads as follows:

For heroism in effecting the rescue of a woman from the burning Grand Hotel, Yokohama, Japan, on 1 September 1923. Following the earthquake and fire which occurred in Yokohama on 1 September, Ens. Ryan, with complete disregard for his own life, extricated a woman from the Grand Hotel, thus saving her life. His heroic conduct upon this occasion reflects the greatest credit on himself and on the U.S. Navy, of which he is a part.

== See also ==
- List of Medal of Honor recipients
- List of Medal of Honor recipients in non-combat incidents
