= Dapu Road Tunnel =

Tunnel in Shanghai, China

Dapu Road Tunnel 打浦路隧道
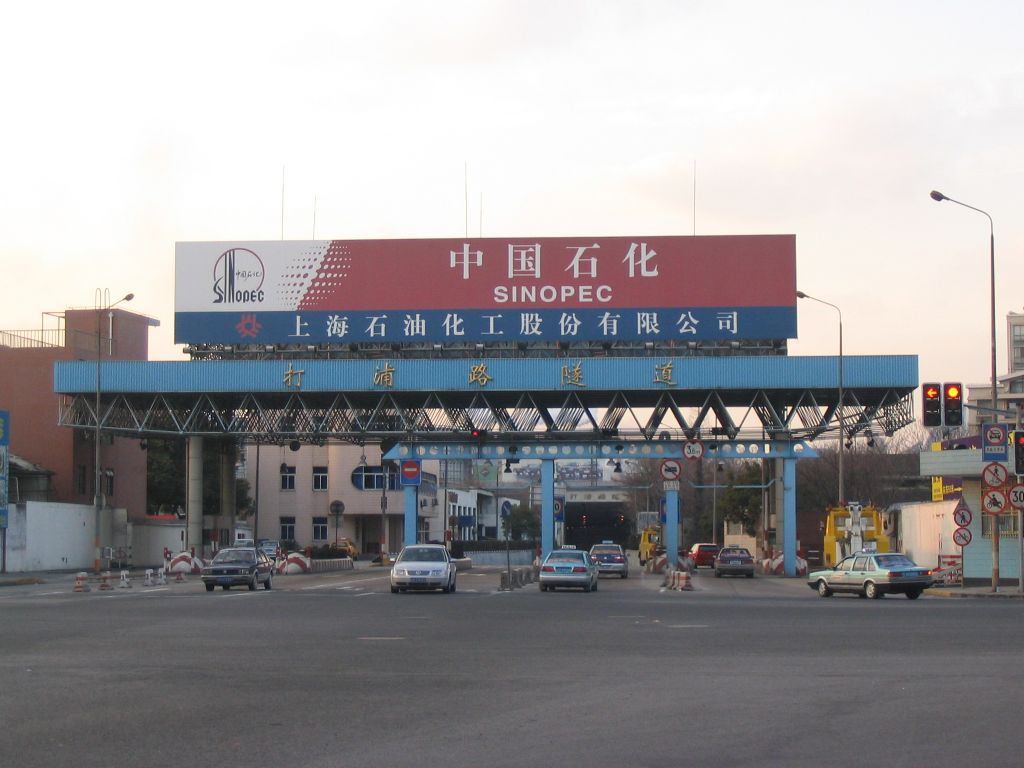
- The old entrance to the Dapu Road Tunnel on the Pudong side.
- Interactive map of Dapu Road Tunnel 打浦路隧道

Overview
- Location: Shanghai, China
- Coordinates: 31°11′24″N 121°28′19″E
- Start: East Rihui Road and South Zhongshan No. 1 Road, Huangpu District
- End: Changqing Road and Yaohua Road, Pudong New Area

Operation
- Work began: May 1965 (east tube); April 2009 (west tube)
- Opened: June 1971 (east tube); February 11, 2010 (west tube)

Technical
- Length: 2.739 km (1.702 mi) (east tube); 2.971 km (1.846 mi) (west tube)
- No. of lanes: 4 lanes (2 northbound and 2 southbound)
- Operating speed: 40 km/h (25 mph)

The Dapu Road Tunnel (Chinese: 打浦路隧道), formerly Huangpu River Tunnel or Project 651, is a road tunnel that runs under the Huangpu River in the city of Shanghai, China. It connects Huangpu District on the Puxi side of Shanghai with Pudong New Area. It consists of two tubes, the first of which was constructed between 1965 and 1970 and acted as the first vehicular tunnel underneath the Huangpu River in. The tunnel has two lanes and originally operated with one lane in each direction. Due to the need for greater capacity brought on by Shanghai's Expo 2010, a second tube was built between 2009 and 2010 just to the west of the first, opening on February 11, 2010. When the second tube opened, the first tube was converted for northbound traffic only while the new tube carried southbound traffic. The east, northbound tube is 2.739 km (1.702 mi) in length, while the west, southbound tube is 2.971 km (1.846 mi) long.
