= Japanese destroyer Tsuga (1920) =

Destroyer of the Imperial Japanese Navy

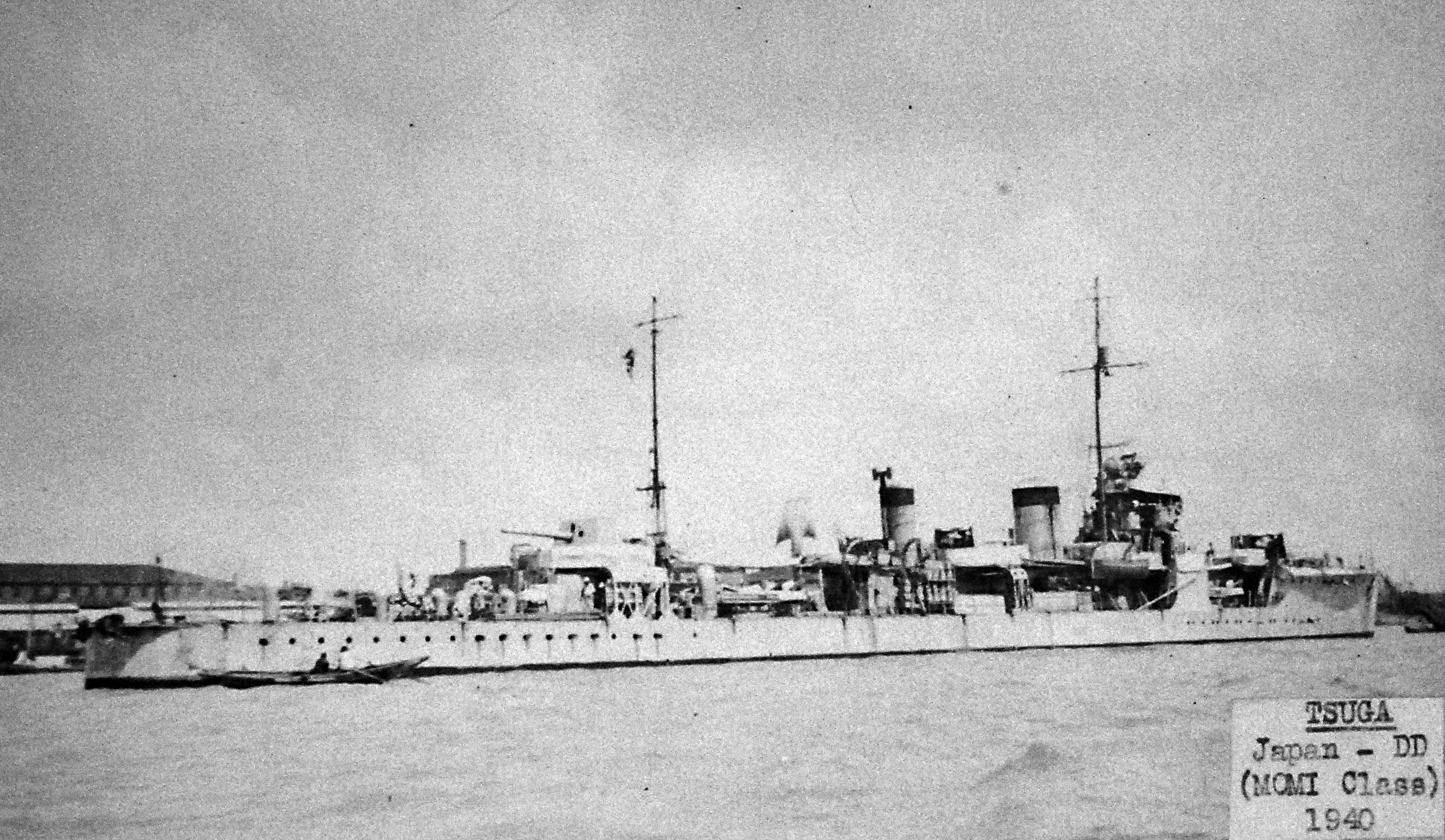
- Tsuga in 1940

History

Empire of Japan
- Name: Tsuga
- Builder: Ishikawajima, Tokyo
- Laid down: 5 March 1919
- Launched: 17 April 1920
- Completed: 20 July 1920
- Stricken: 10 March 1945
- Fate: Sunk by American aircraft, 15 January 1945

General characteristics (as built)
- Type: Momi-class destroyer
- Displacement: 850 long tons (864 t) (normal); 1,020 long tons (1,036 t) (deep load)
- Length: 275 ft (83.8 m) (pp); 280 ft (85.3 m) (o/a)
- Beam: 26 ft (7.9 m)
- Draft: 8 ft (2.4 m)
- Installed power: 3 × Kampon water-tube boilers; 21,500 shp (16,000 kW)
- Propulsion: 2 shafts; 2 × geared steam turbines
- Speed: 36 knots (67 km/h; 41 mph)
- Range: 3,000 nmi (5,600 km; 3,500 mi) at 15 knots (28 km/h; 17 mph)
- Complement: 110
- Armament: 3 × single 12 cm (4.7 in) guns; 2 × twin 533 mm (21 in) torpedo tubes

The Japanese destroyer Tsuga (栂) was one of 21 Momi-class destroyers built for the Imperial Japanese Navy (IJN) in the late 1910s. She spent most of the Pacific War patrolling and escorting convoys in and around Chinese waters, during which the ship participated in the Battle of Hong Kong in December 1941. Tsuga was sunk by American carrier aircraft in early 1945.

== Design and description ==
The Momi class was designed with higher speed and better seakeeping than the preceding Enoki-class second-class destroyers. The ships had an overall length of 280 feet (85.3 m) and were 275 feet (83.8 m) between perpendiculars. They had a beam of 26 feet (7.9 m), and a mean draft of 8 feet (2.4 m). The Momi-class ships displaced 850 long tons (864 t) at standard load and 1,020 long tons (1,036 t) at deep load. Tsuga was powered by two Parsons geared steam turbines, each driving one propeller shaft using steam provided by three Kampon water-tube boilers. The turbines were designed to produce 21,500 shaft horsepower (16,000 kW) to give the ships a speed of 36 knots (67 km/h; 41 mph). The ships carried a maximum of 275 long tons (279 t) of fuel oil which gave them a range of 3,000 nautical miles (5,600 km; 3,500 mi) at 15 knots (28 km/h; 17 mph). Their crew consisted of 110 officers and crewmen.

The main armament of the Momi-class ships consisted of three 12-centimeter (4.7 in) Type 3 guns in single mounts; one gun forward of the well deck, one between the two funnels, and the last gun atop the aft superstructure. The guns were numbered '1' to '3' from front to rear. The ships carried two above-water twin sets of 533-millimeter (21 in) torpedo tubes; one mount was in the well deck between the forward superstructure and the bow gun and the other between the aft funnel and aft superstructure.

== Construction and career ==
Tsuga, built at the Ishikawajima shipyard in Tokyo, was laid down on 5 March 1919, launched on 17 April 1920 and completed on 20 July 1920.

=== Second Sino-Japanese War ===
On August 6 1937, Tsugu departed Nanjing and sailed up the Yangtze River towards Hankou. On the 8th, Tsugu picked up the naval landing force in Hankou and departed for Shanghai. It arrived in Shanghai on the 10th.

On August 14, the Tsuga, while patrolling between Qiliakou and the Tongzhou Strait in the upper reaches of the Yangtze River, was bombed by Republic of China Air Force aircraft. At 11:10 AM (Japan time, 10:10 AM local time), eight Northrop bombers of the Republic of China appeared to the west at an altitude of approximately 4,000 meters (13,123 ft). The Republic of China Air Force aircraft descended to an altitude of approximately 200 meters where they bombed and strafed the Tsuga for about six minutes, dropping a total of 16 bombs. The Tsuga fought back with machine guns and rifles, and the Japanese Navy claimed to have shot down one Republic of China Air Force aircraft. Three crew members of the Tsuga were killed in the attack. Shortly before 9 a.m. (Japan time) on August 26, the Hasu and Tsuga shelled the Republic of China Navy survey ship Houri at Tiansheng Port near Nantong on the Yangtze River which caught fire.

In the early hours of September 6, Tsuga docked at Qiujiang Pier on the Huangpu River bank north of the Shanghai International Settlement and launched a landing operation for a portion of the 9th Company (Nakamura Company). On December 14, Tsuga advanced up the Yangtze River in front of Nanjing . And the 15th, it bombarded the island known as "Hulk" in the lower reaches of the Yangtze River in Nanjing.

During the Yangtze River upwind operation in 1938, the following year, on July 3, the Tsuga seized weapons diagrams and other materials from downed enemy aircraft during an air raid on Anqing anchorage.

=== Pacific War ===
In December 1941 the Tsuga entered the Pacific War, assigned to the China Area Fleet with two of her sister ships, Hasu and Huri. Tsuga Participated in the invasion of Hong Kong. Afterwards in 1942 Tsuga was assigned to the Shanghai Guard Unit, and the 4.7 midship mounts were replaced with 2 triple Type 96 25mm AA Mounts. Tsuga then performed patrol and convoy duty. In 1944 while taking part in the Battle of the Philippines, Tsugu participated in a group that escorted the 1st supply forces Nichiei Maru; the group was attacked by Task Force 58 of USS Wasp (CV 18). On January 15, 1945, Tsuga was sunk in Makong Anchorage in the Penghu Islands by an attack from aircraft of the United States Navy Task Force 38 at coordinates 23°33′N 119°33′E.
