= Japanese destroyer Kuri =

Destroyer in the Imperial Japanese Navy

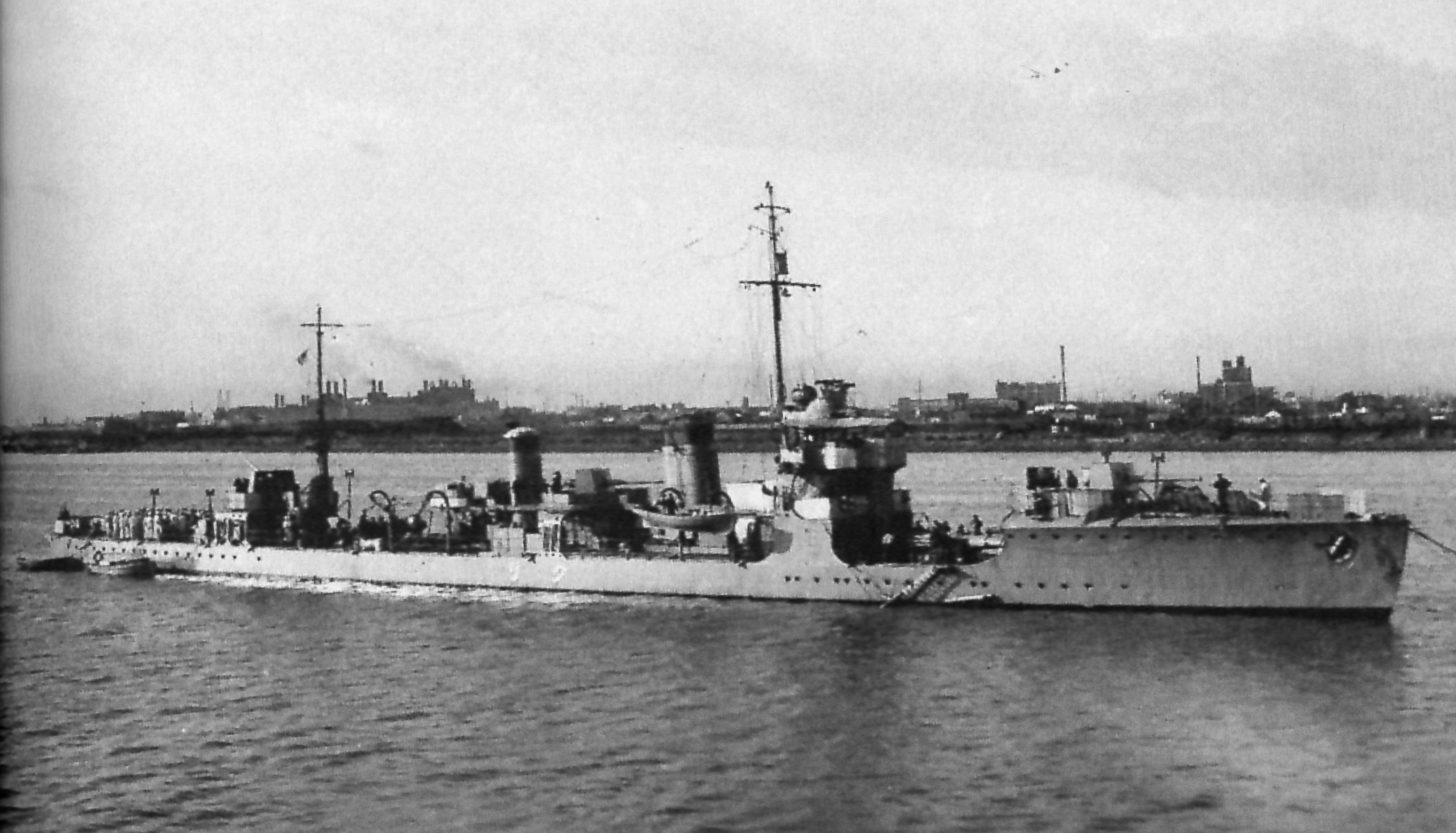
- Kuri at anchor, 1937

History

Empire of Japan
- Name: Kuri
- Builder: Kure Naval Arsenal, Hiroshima, Japan
- Laid down: 5 December 1919
- Launched: 19 March 1920
- Completed: 30 April 1920
- Stricken: 25 October 1945
- Fate: Surrendered, struck a mine off of Pusan, Korea 8 October 1945

General characteristics as built
- Type: Momi-class destroyer
- Displacement: 850 long tons (864 t) (normal); 1,020 long tons (1,036 t) (deep load)
- Length: 275 ft (83.8 m) (pp); 280 ft (85.3 m) (o/a)
- Beam: 26 ft (7.9 m)
- Draft: 8 ft (2.4 m)
- Installed power: 3 × Kampon water-tube boilers; 21,500 shp (16,000 kW)
- Propulsion: 2 shafts; 2 × geared steam turbines
- Speed: 36 knots (67 km/h; 41 mph)
- Range: 3,000 nmi (5,600 km; 3,500 mi) at 15 knots (28 km/h; 17 mph)
- Complement: 110
- Armament: 3 × single 12 cm (4.7 in) guns; 2 × twin 533 mm (21 in) torpedo tubes

The Japanese destroyer Kuri (栗) was one of 21 Momi-class destroyers built for the Imperial Japanese Navy (IJN) in the late 1910s. She struck a mine off of Pusan, Korea, in October 1945 and was subsequently stricken from the naval list.

== Design and description ==
The Momi class was designed with higher speed and better seakeeping than the preceding Enoki-class second-class destroyers. The ships had an overall length of 280 feet (85.3 m) and were 275 feet (83.8 m) between perpendiculars. They had a beam of 26 feet (7.9 m), and a mean draft of 8 feet (2.4 m). The Momi-class ships displaced 850 long tons (864 t) at standard load and 1,020 long tons (1,036 t) at deep load. Kuri was powered by two Brown-Curtis geared steam turbines, each driving one propeller shaft using steam provided by three Kampon water-tube boilers. The turbines were designed to produce 21,500 shaft horsepower (16,000 kW) to give the ships a speed of 36 knots (67 km/h; 41 mph). The ships carried a maximum of 275 long tons (279 t) of fuel oil which gave them a range of 3,000 nautical miles (5,600 km; 3,500 mi) at 15 knots (28 km/h; 17 mph). Their crew consisted of 110 officers and crewmen.

The main armament of the Momi-class ships consisted of three 12-centimeter (4.7 in) Type 3 guns in single mounts; one gun forward of the well deck, one between the two funnels, and the last gun atop the aft superstructure. The guns were numbered '1' to '3' from front to rear. The ships carried two above-water twin sets of 533-millimeter (21 in) torpedo tubes; one mount was in the well deck between the forward superstructure and the bow gun and the other between the aft funnel and aft superstructure.

== Construction and career ==
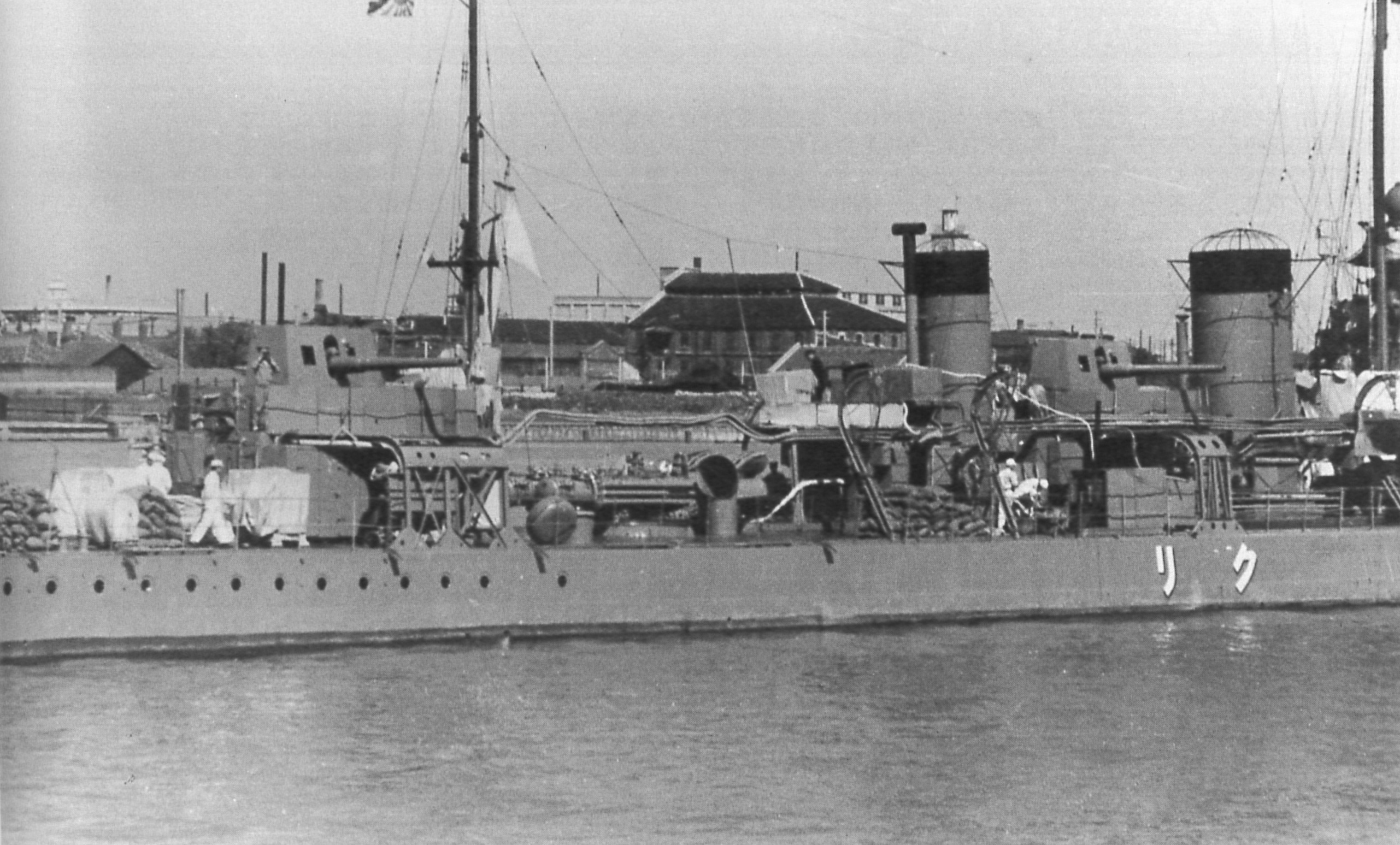
IJN Kuri in 1937

IJN Kuri at Shanghai

Kuri was built at the Kure Naval Arsenal in Hiroshima, Japan. Laid down on December 5 1919, launched on March 19, 1920, and completed on April 30, 1920. During the Sino-Japanese War she supported the naval landing at Anqing during the Battle of Wuhan with sister ships Tsuga and Hasu. At the start of the Pacific War she took part in the blockade of Corregidor island and Manila during the Battle of the Philippines. In 1942 the 4.7 Type 3 midship mounts were replaced with 2 triple Type 96 25mm AA Mounts. Kuri spent much of WWII on patrol duty and convoy escort. In 1942 Kuri was dispatched to rescue survivors from the collision of NYK passenger liner Kobe Muru and army cargo ship Tenzan Maru. Soon after on March 25th 1943 Kuri collided with repair ship Hayase at Kiangnan shipyard. Then on June 24th 1943, Kuri ran aground off Nanchishan after colliding with Chefoo Maru on the port side. Kuri is towed to Kiangan shipyards and repaired through July and August. Kuri continues on patrol and escort duties; surrendering at Qingdao at the end of the war, but striking a mine off of Pusan on October 8, 1945, while on minesweeping duty. The ship was officially stricken from the naval list on October 25.
