= Songpu Bridge =

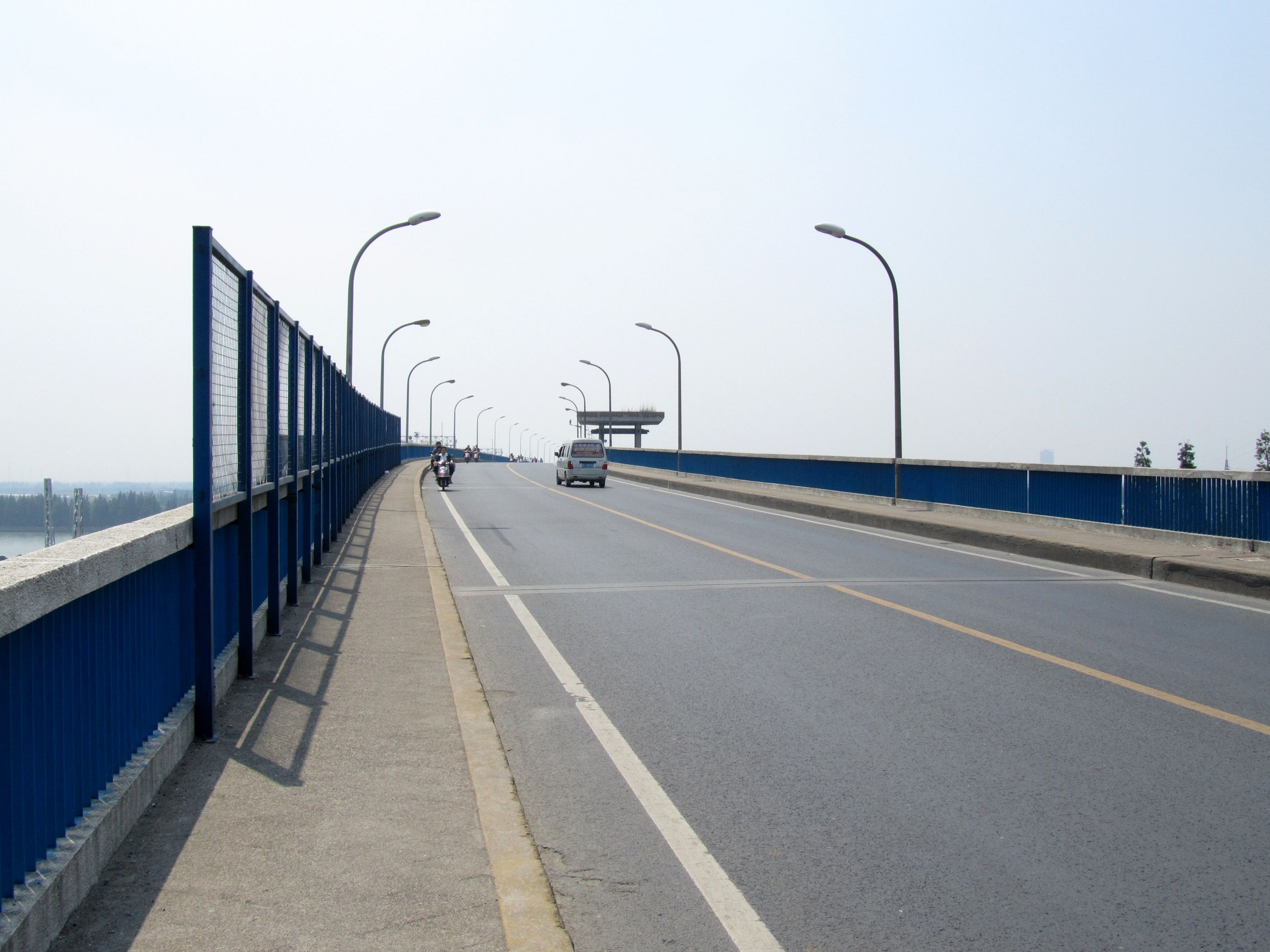
- Coordinates: 30°58′20″N 121°18′29″E
- Carries: 320 National Highway, Cheting Highway, Jinshan Railway Branch
- Crosses: Huangpu River
- Locale: Songjiang District, Shanghai, China

Characteristics
- Height: 3,047.6 meters (9,998.69 feet)

History
- Opened: September 11, 1975 (railway bridge), June 29, 1976 (road bridge)

Statistics
- Toll: no

Location
- Interactive map of Songpu Bridge

Songpu Bridge, first known as Huangpu River Bridge, Cheting Bridge, is the first bridge built across the Huangpu River in Shanghai, China. It is a double-layer steel truss bridge for highway and railway across the Huangpu River in Songjiang District. The Songpu Bridge Railway Bridge and Highway Bridge were opened to traffic on September 11, 1975 and June 29, 1976, respectively. For a long time after its completion, it was also the only bridge on the upper reaches of the Huangpu River until the opening of the Huangpu River Bridge on the G15 Shenhai Expressway in 2006.

The Songpu Bridge is located between Chedun Town and Yexie Town in Songjiang District. It takes about 5 minutes to cross this 4-kilometer bridge. The bridge is divided into two layers. The upper road bridge is part of the 320 National Road Cheting Highway. The lower railway bridge was originally used for the Jinshan branch of the Shanghai-Hangzhou Railway. The railway line is a single line. The railway has been abandoned.

== History ==
=== Construction ===
In June 1972, the Central State Council approved the construction of Shanghai Jinshan Petrochemical Complex, which was selected as the Hangzhou Bay in the Jinshanwei area in the southern part of Jinshan District. The first phase of the project was started in the same year and was completed in 1976. At the same time, in order to meet the transportation needs after the completion of the alloy mountain petrochemical plant, new roads and railways need to be built for cargo transportation. Songpu Bridge is one of the key projects for the construction of Jinshan Petrochemical General Plant. The bridge spans the Huangpu River. The Jinshan Railway branch line and the Cheting Highway passing through the bridge play an important role in Jinshan Petrochemical's external transportation.

The bridge was started on July 26, 1974. It was invested by Shanghai Jinshan Petrochemical General Plant and the Survey and Design Department of the Ministry of Railways Bridge Bureau was responsible for the main project design of the bridge. The railway bridge was completed and opened to traffic on September 11, 1975. The highway bridge was completed and opened to traffic on June 29, 1976. The bridge was named Huangpu River Bridge.

=== Operation ===
In November 1977, the bridge passed the inspection and acceptance of the Huangpu River Bridge Acceptance and Transfer Team. From December 1 of the same year, the railway part of the bridge was handed over to the Huangpu River Bridge Management Office of the Shanghai Railway Bureau. The upper section of the bridge is managed by the Songjiang County Highway Management Office. From December 1, 1980, the railway was partially transferred to the Shanghai Municipal Railway Administration for management. Since January 1, 1987, Songpu Bridge began to collect motor vehicle bridge fees, and then canceled the charges in the mid-to-late 1990s. In 1989, the Huangpu River Bridge was renamed the Cheting Bridge. In the 1990s, the newly built trans-Huangpu River Bridge in Shanghai was named after the Puxi area name and Jiapu Bridge (such as Nanpu Bridge and Yangpu Bridge). Therefore, in 1995, the Cheting Bridge was renamed Songpu Bridge with the word "Pu" after the first name of Songjiang County (now Songjiang District) and it is still used today. On October 22, 2007, the Songpu Bridge was completely overhauled. The motor vehicle was changed to the A5 road (now known as the G15 Shenhai Expressway). The project was completed on August 1, 2008, and the bridge was restored to traffic.

== Structure ==
The upper section of the Songpu Bridge upper bridge (including the approach bridge) is 1854.45 meters, of which the main bridge is 420 meters long. The bridge deck is equipped with two motorways with two widths of 9 meters. There are 1.5 meters wide sidewalks on both sides; the lower railway bridge is Shanghai. The Jinshan branch of the Hangzhou-Hangzhou Railway is used. The total length (including the approach bridge) is 3047.6 meters, of which the bridge is 420 meters long and the pier is 28 meters high. The railway line of the bridge is a single-track railway, and the electrification implementation conditions are not reserved.

The bridge is a continuous steel truss structure. The upper structure is a riveted triangular steel truss continuous beam with a length of 419.6 meters; the lower structure has three piers in the middle of the river. The navigation clearance under the bridge is 10 meters. The railway and highway approach bridges have 74 and 38 bridge piers respectively. There is a tower at the junction of the two bridges and the approach bridge, the north bank tower is located in the west of the bridge; the south bank tower is located in the east of the bridge.

== Status ==
The Songpu Bridge Highway Bridge section is part of the 320 National Highway. Due to the early construction of the Songpu Bridge, there are only two motor vehicle lanes in the two directions. Many bus lines from Shanghai and Songjiang and south to Jinshan need to cross the river through the bridge. The traffic congestion on weekdays is more serious, affecting travel. The bridge is currently undergoing widening operations to ease congestion.

The railway bridge is part of the Jinshan Railway branch line, which is the freight railway to the Jinshan Petrochemical Plant. It also has a passenger transportation service. The railway originally had a passenger train of Shanghai South (Meilong Station) -Jin Weidong, but the train was on September 28, 2002. It will be suspended from the day. After that, there were still two pairs of K8351/8352 and K8353/8354 trains from Shanghai South - Luchao Port passing through the Songpu Bridge, and a small number of freight trains crossing the bridge.

At present, the Jinshan Railway branch line of the railway bridge section has been rebuilt. The Huangpu River Bridge on the Jinshan Railway was built in the east of the bridge for the rail transit line 22. The bridge was completed on March 22, 2011. After the completion of the Huangpu River Bridge of Jinshan Railway, the K8351/8352, K8353/8354 trains were changed to the Xinqiao River, and the Songpu Bridge Railway Bridge was partially abandoned. At present, the railroad tracks on the bridge have been demolished and it is planned to be converted into pedestrians and bicycle lanes.

== Other ==
=== Jinshan Branch Railway ===
The design standard of the Jinshan railway branch line of the Songpu Bridge railway section is Grade II branch line, which is a single-track railway. The two-line and electrified railway implementation conditions are not reserved. The railway started construction on December 25, 1973, and was partially opened to traffic on May 31, 1974. On September 11, 1975, the Songpu Bridge railway bridge was partially opened to traffic. On September 15, 1975, the Jinshan branch was delivered to the Shanghai Railway Bureau, and the entire railway was opened to traffic. All located: Minhang West, of Terrace, Nguyen Lane, Sanyo, Jin Weidong, Golden Meditech West six stations. At present, some of the functions of the Songpu Bridge railway have been moved to the newly built Jinshan Railway Huangpu River Bridge.

=== Cheting Highway ===
Matsuura Bridge Road that is part of State Road 320 bus shelters Road, Songjiang Chedun after the bridge crossing the river leading to Jinshan Town Pavilion. The road in March 1974 started construction on June 29, 1976, and the bridge was opened to traffic synchronization.
