= Japanese destroyer Hasu =

Destroyer in the Imperial Japanese Navy

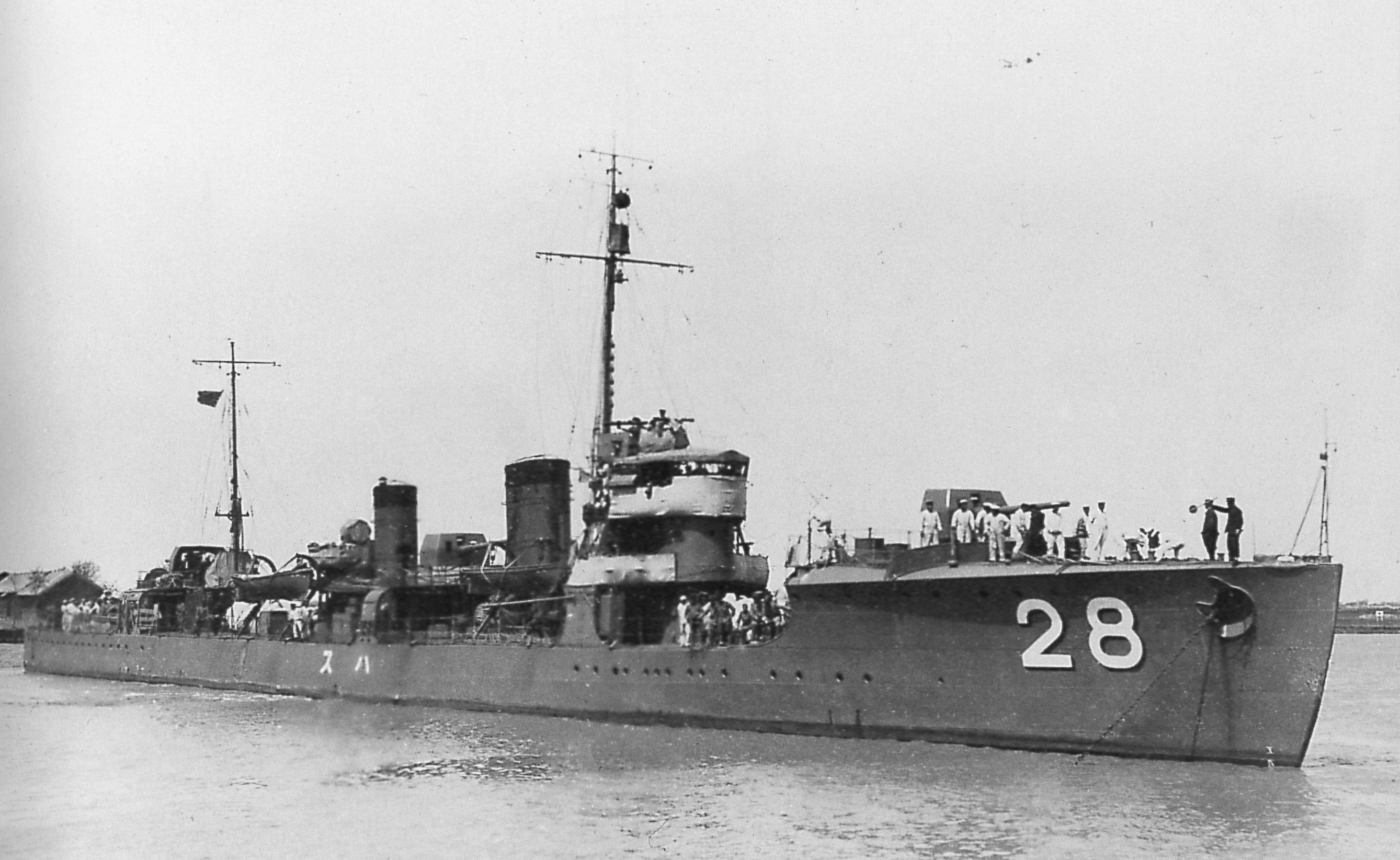
- Hasu, 1928

History

Empire of Japan
- Name: Hasu
- Builder: Uraga Dock Company, Uraga, Japan
- Laid down: 2 March 1921
- Launched: 8 December 1921
- Completed: 31 July 1922
- Fate: Retired 12 October 1945; scuttled as breakwater in Fukui, 1946.

General characteristics (as built)
- Type: Momi-class destroyer
- Displacement: 850 long tons (864 t) (normal); 1,020 long tons (1,036 t) (deep load)
- Length: 275 ft (83.8 m) (pp); 280 ft (85.3 m) (o/a)
- Beam: 26 ft (7.9 m)
- Draft: 8 ft (2.4 m)
- Installed power: 3 × Kampon water-tube boilers; 21,500 shp (16,000 kW)
- Propulsion: 2 shafts; 2 × geared steam turbines
- Speed: 36 knots (67 km/h; 41 mph)
- Range: 3,000 nmi (5,600 km; 3,500 mi) at 15 knots (28 km/h; 17 mph)
- Complement: 110
- Armament: 3 × single 12 cm (4.7 in) guns; 2 × twin 533 mm (21 in) torpedo tubes

The Japanese destroyer Hasu (蓮) was one of 21 Momi-class destroyers built for the Imperial Japanese Navy (IJN) in the late 1910s. After serving for 23 years and throughout the Pacific War, she was retired 12 October 1945 and scuttled as breakwater in Fukui in 1946.

== Design and description ==
The Momi class was designed with higher speed and better seakeeping than the preceding Enoki-class second-class destroyers. The ships had an overall length of 280 feet (85.3 m) and were 275 feet (83.8 m) between perpendiculars. They had a beam of 26 feet (7.9 m), and a mean draft of 8 feet (2.4 m). The Momi-class ships displaced 850 long tons (864 t) at standard load and 1,020 long tons (1,036 t) at deep load. Hasu was powered by two Parsons geared steam turbines, each driving one propeller shaft using steam provided by three Kampon water-tube boilers. The turbines were designed to produce 21,500 shaft horsepower (16,000 kW) to give the ships a speed of 36 knots (67 km/h; 41 mph). The ships carried a maximum of 275 long tons (279 t) of fuel oil which gave them a range of 3,000 nautical miles (5,600 km; 3,500 mi) at 15 knots (28 km/h; 17 mph). Their crew consisted of 110 officers and crewmen.

The main armament of the Momi-class ships consisted of three 12-centimeter (4.7 in) Type 3 guns in single mounts; one gun forward of the well deck, one between the two funnels, and the last gun atop the aft superstructure. The guns were numbered '1' to '3' from front to rear. The ships carried two above-water twin sets of 533-millimeter (21 in) torpedo tubes; one mount was in the well deck between the forward superstructure and the bow gun and the other between the aft funnel and aft superstructure.

In 1939–40, Hishi was converted into a patrol boat. Her torpedo tubes, minesweeping gear, and aft 12 cm gun were removed in exchange for two triple mounts for license-built 25 mm (1 in) Type 96 light AA guns and 60 depth charges. In addition one boiler was removed, which reduced her speed to 18 knots (33 km/h; 21 mph) from 12,000 shp (8,900 kW). These changes made her top heavy and ballast had to be added which increased her displacement to 950 metric tons (935 long tons).

== Construction and career ==
Hasu, built at the Uraga Dock Company in Uraga, was launched on 8 December 1921, and completed on 31 July 1922. The ship participated in the naval landing at Anqing during the Battle of Wuhan alongside sistership Kuri and Tsuga. On December 8th 1941 Hasu fired upon and sank HMS Peteral in Shanghai, with support of other Japanese vessels including Izumo. In 1942 Hasu's 4.7 mounts were replaced with two triple 25mm Type 96 AA guns. Throughout much the war Hasu partook in patrols and convoys. Hasu is surrendered on September 16th 1945 It was officially retired on 12 October 1945, and later scraped in Sasebo in 1948.
