= Fengpu Bridge =

Fengpu Bridge 奉浦大桥
- Coordinates: 31°00′22″N 121°26′31″E
- Carries: Motor vehicles
- Crosses: Huangpu River
- Locale: Shanghai, China

Characteristics
- Total length: 2.2 kilometres (1.4 mi)
- Traversable?: Yes

History
- Construction cost: ¥446 million
- Opened: 26 October 1995

Location
- Interactive map of Fengpu Bridge

The Fengpu Bridge is one of several bridges that crosses the Huangpu River in Shanghai. Completed in 1995, this bridge links the S4 Shanghai–Jinshan Expressway between Minhang District to the north and Fengxian District to the south. It currently carries two lanes of the expressway in each direction. To ease congestion along the bridge, a second bridge is planned to the east of the current bridge.
