= Yangpu Bridge =

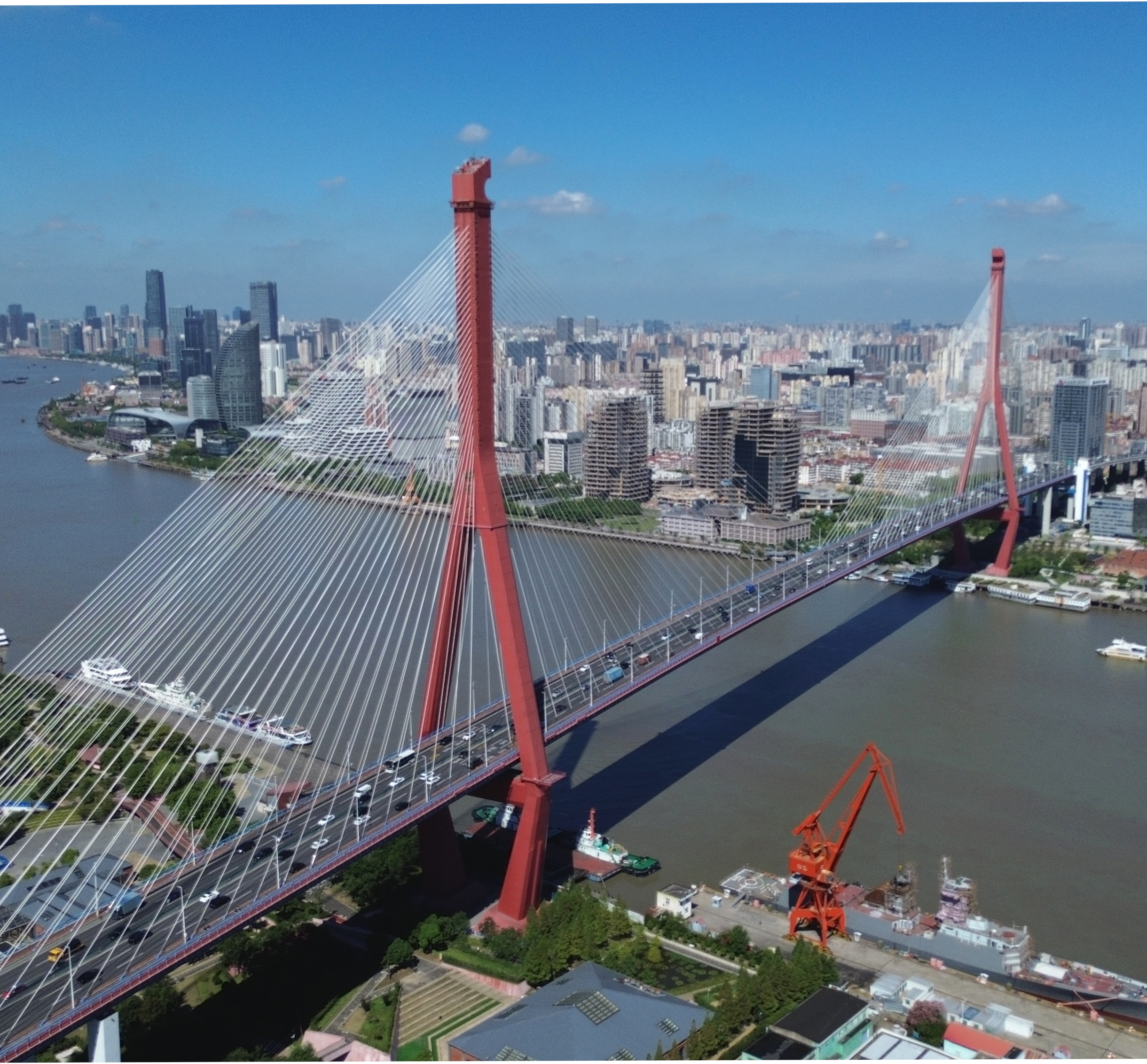
- Coordinates: 31°15′25″N 121°32′29″E
- Carries: 6 lanes of Inner Ring Road
- Crosses: Huangpu River
- Locale: Shanghai, China

Characteristics
- Design: cable-stayed bridge
- Total length: 8,354 metres (27,408 ft)
- Width: 30.35 metres (100 ft)
- Height: 223 metres (732 ft)
- Longest span: 602 metres (1,975 ft)

History
- Construction cost: $259 million USD
- Opened: October 1993

Location
- Interactive map of Yangpu Bridge

The Yangpu Bridge (simplified Chinese: 杨浦大桥; traditional Chinese: 楊浦大橋; pinyin: Yángpǔ Dàqiáo) is a sister bridge to the Nanpu Bridge, both crossing the Huangpu River in Shanghai, China. Yangpu is among the world's longest bridges, with a total length of 8354 meters. Its longest span of 602 m makes it one of the longest cable-stayed bridges in the world. It carries the Inner Ring Road from the Yangpu District in Puxi to the Pudong New Area. It was completed in September 1993 and opened in October. It is the last vehicular bridge over the Huangpu River before the river empties into the sea.

== Background ==
Since 1911, ferries connected the two banks of the Huangpu River. By the 1980s there were 22 passenger ferry routes and 5 vehicle ferries, transporting over 1 million passengers and over 22,000 motor vehicles daily, making it possibly the busiest ferry in the world, despite the opening of the Dapu Road Tunnel in 1971, followed by the Yan'an East Road Tunnel in 1988. While building another tunnel was considered the most suitable option, mayor Zhu Rongji pushed for construction of a bridge, which could also serve as a landmark for the city.

== Design ==
The bridge was designed by the Shanghai Municipal Engineering Design Institute, Shanghai Urban Construction College, and Shanghai Urban Construction Design Institute, with assistance from Holger Svensson and Tung-Yen Lin under chief designer Lin Yuanpei. It was built by the Shanghai Huangpujiang Bridge Engineering Construction company.

It is a double-tower and double-cable-stayed bridge, with the bridge proper (the part that spans the river) 1172 m long. Its 30.35 m width carries six lanes of traffic, three for each direction. Its two pylons reach 223 m in height. The highest ship clearance is 48 m, a necessity due to the heavy river traffic. From its completion until the completion of the Pont de Normandie, it was the world's longest cable-stayed bridge.

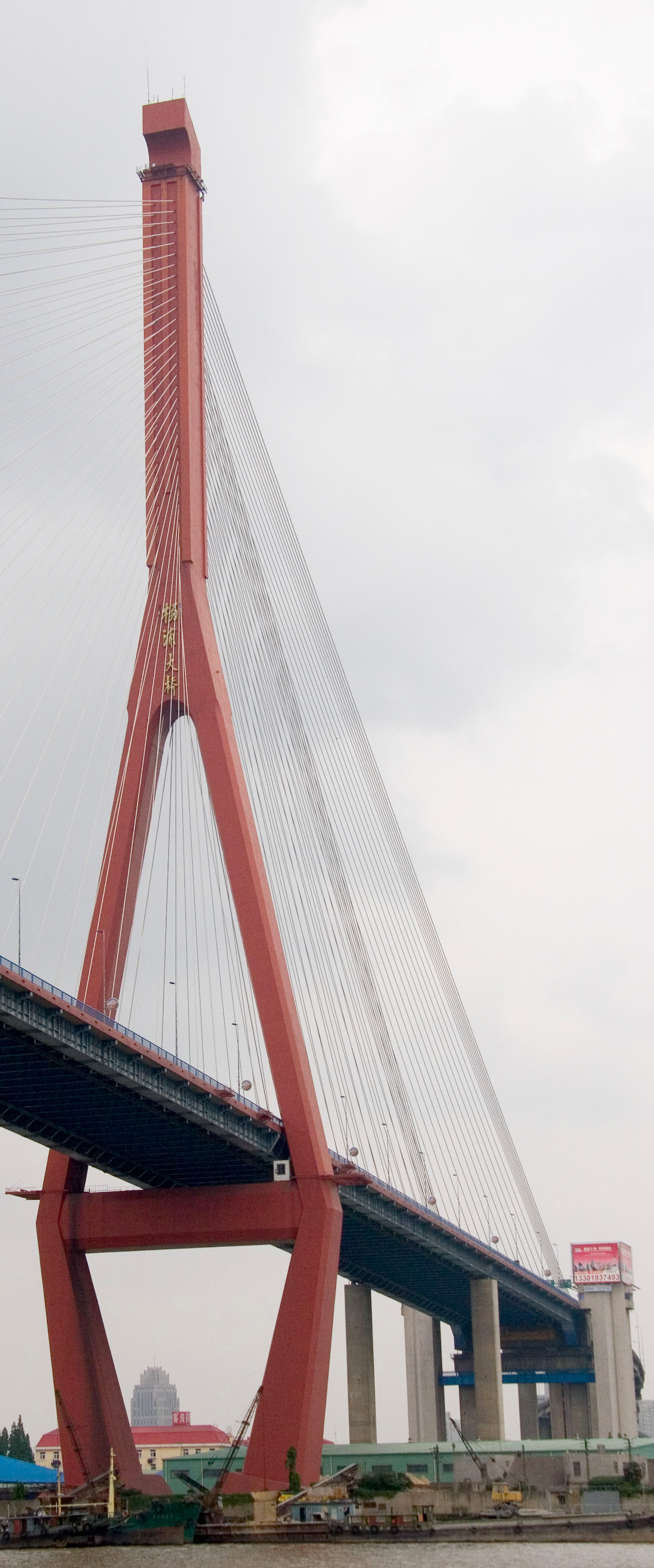
East pylon

The two main abutments support high, upside-down Y-shaped towers (or pylons) from which the supporting cables are strung. There are two two-meter-wide sightseeing sidewalks on both sides of the bridge.

The bridge was originally unpainted; it was coated with red paint for the millennium. The name Yangpu Bridge (杨浦大桥) inscribed on each pylon was originally hand-written by Deng Xiaoping.

== Traffic statistics ==
As of 2006, it carries more than 100,000 vehicles per day.
