= Battle of Kolombangara =

World War II Pacific naval battle

- Part of the Pacific Theater of World War II
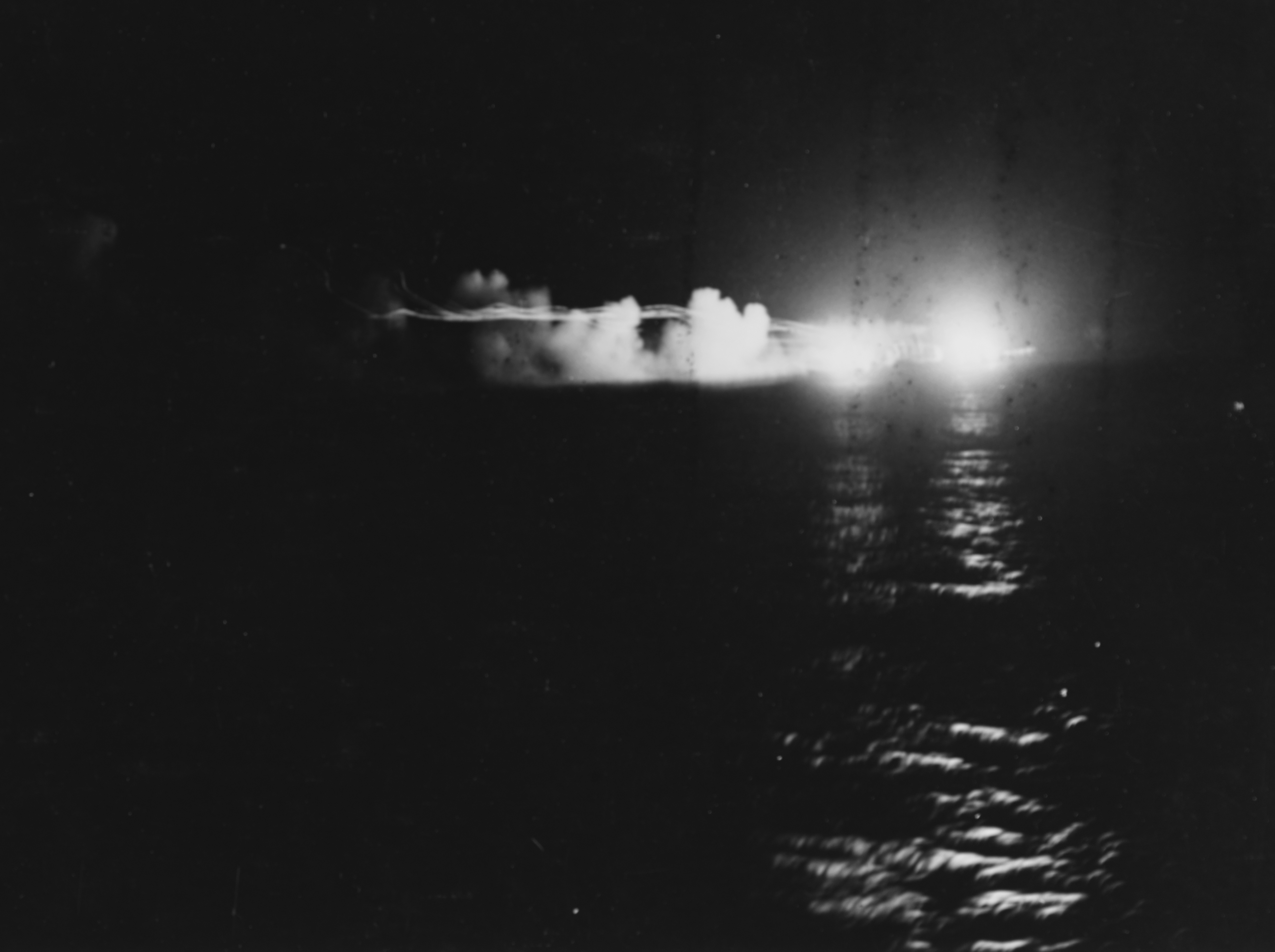
- The cruisers USS St. Louis and HMNZS Leander firing
Date	12/13 July 1943
Location	Kolombangara in the Solomon Islands
Result	Japanese victory

Belligerents
United States; New Zealand	Japan

Commanders and leaders
(United States) Walden Ainsworth	(Empire of Japan) Shunji Isaki †

Strength
3 light cruisers, 10 destroyers	1 light cruiser, 5 destroyers 4 destroyer-transports

Casualties and losses
1 destroyer sunk, 3 light cruisers damaged (two severely), 89 killed	1 light cruiser sunk, 482 killed

The Battle of Kolombangara (Japanese: コロンバンガラ島沖海戦) (also known as the Second Battle of Kula Gulf) was a naval battle of the Pacific campaign of World War II, fought on the night of 12/13 July 1943, off the northeastern coast of Kolombangara in the Solomon Islands. The battle took place during the early stages of the New Georgia campaign when an Imperial Japanese Navy force, carrying reinforcements south to Vila, Solomon Islands, was intercepted by a task force of U.S. and New Zealand light cruisers and destroyers. In the ensuing action, the Japanese sank one Allied destroyer and damaged three cruisers. They were also able to successfully land 1,200 ground troops on the western coast of Kolombangara but lost one light cruiser sunk in the process.

== Background ==
The Allied campaign in New Georgia had begun on 30 June 1943 as part of their advance through the central Solomon Islands towards Rabaul under the guise of Operation Cartwheel. In the initial phase of the operation, Rendova had been captured to provide a staging point for U.S. forces assigned to capture the Japanese airfield at Munda Point, which was one of the campaign's key objectives. On 2 July, troops of the U.S. 43rd Infantry Division landed on New Georgia to attack Munda, while three days later a battalion of Marine Raiders and two U.S. Army battalions were landed at Rice Anchorage on New Georgia's northern shore to seize Bairoko.

In response to the Allied landings, the Japanese sought to reinforce New Georgia to shore up the southern flank to their base around Rabaul. On the night of 12 July a Japanese "Tokyo Express" naval reinforcement force made a run down "The Slot" from Rabaul to land troops at Vila on Kolombangara by way of the Kula Gulf. This force was commanded by Rear Admiral (少将 shōshō) Shunji Isaki and consisted of the light cruiser Jintsū, the destroyers Mikazuki, Yukikaze, Hamakaze, Kiyonami and Yūgure, as well as the destroyer transports Satsuki, Minazuki, Yūnagi, and Matsukaze. These four ships carried 1,200 ground troops which were to be landed on Kolombangara as part of efforts to reinforce area in response to the Allied landings in New Georgia. The Japanese ships of Isaki's force had been drawn from several different numbered elements, but the core was formed by Destroyer Squadron 2.

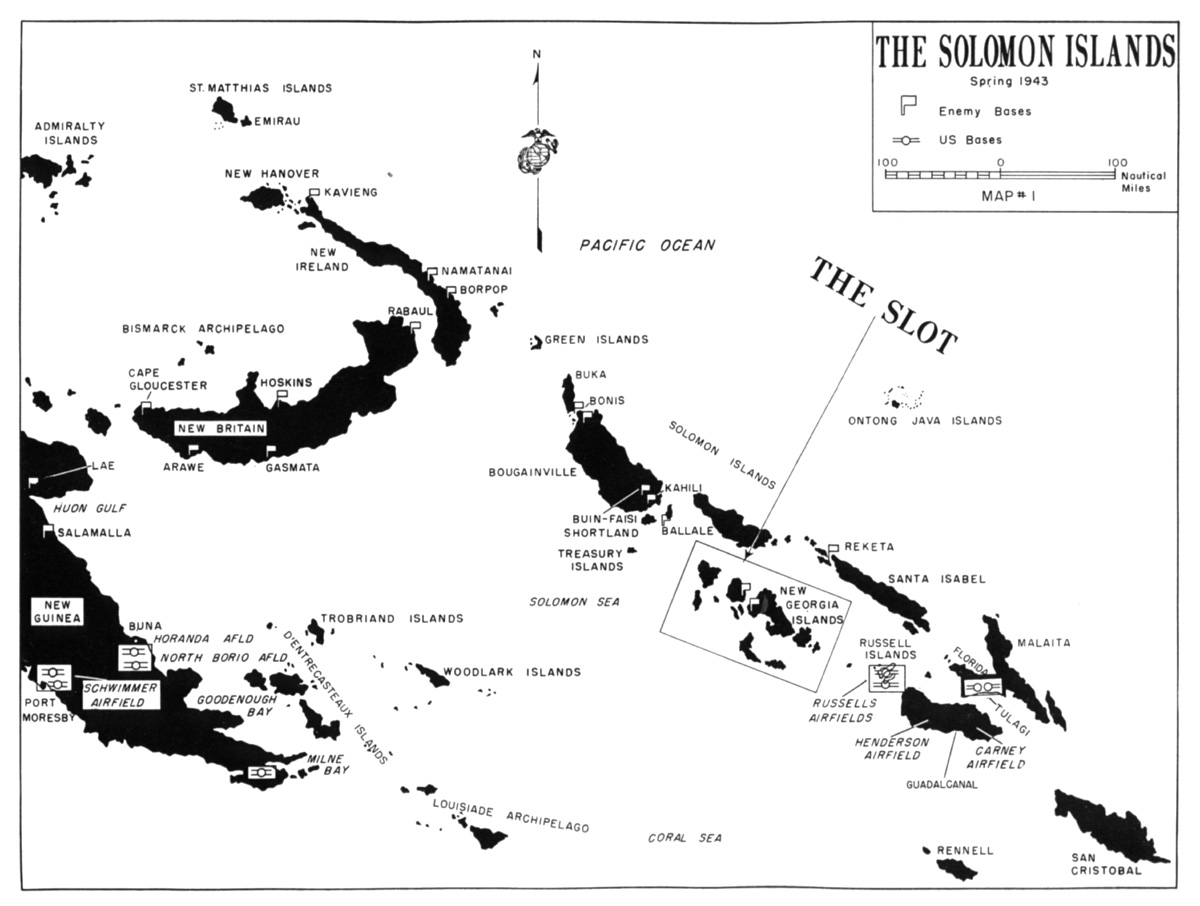
Map of Solomon Islands

The movement of Japanese ships was detected by Allied coastwatchers and reported. In response, Admiral William Halsey ordered a naval task force to intercept the Japanese ships. The Allied naval force, designated Task Force 18, was commanded by Rear Admiral Walden L. Ainsworth. It consisted of two United States Navy light cruisers, USS Honolulu and St. Louis and the Royal New Zealand Navy light cruiser HMNZS Leander, and the destroyers USS Nicholas, O'Bannon, Taylor, Jenkins, Radford, Ralph Talbot, Buchanan, Maury, Woodworth, and Gwin.

In battle these Allied vessels deployed in a single column with five destroyers in the van followed by the light cruisers and then by five destroyers in the rear. Each group of five destroyers formed a squadron. The first of these, designated Destroyer Squadron 21, was commanded by Captain Francis X. McInerney. The second destroyer squadron was Captain Thomas J. Ryan's Destroyer Squadron 12; it had only recently been assigned to Ainworth's task force, as had the New Zealand cruiser which had been assigned to Ainsworth's force following the loss of USS Helena during the Battle of Kula Gulf on 6 July. Together, the three cruisers were grouped together as Cruiser Division 9. Ainsworth's mission was to prevent Japanese troops and supplies from landing as part of efforts to stem the flow of reinforcements towards Munda.

== Battle ==
The U.S. task force sailed from its base around Tulagi at 17:00 on 12 July, amidst clear skies and calm seas. Passing Savo Island, Ainsworth steered a course along the west coast of Santa Isabel Island, hoping to use it to hide his force from Japanese reconnaissance aircraft. His plan for the attack was to use the first squadron of five destroyers that formed his vanguard to fire torpedoes while his cruisers maneuvered into a position to use their main guns. After laying down a heavy barrage, the cruisers would maneuver again to avoid return torpedoes from the Japanese destroyers. Having gone to general quarters due to concerns about being spotted in the bright moonlight of the clear night sky, around midnight the U.S. task force altered course towards Visu Visu. They then increased their speed following reports from Allied reconnaissance aircraft that had spotted Isaki's force about 26 miles (42 km) away. Hamstrung by their slowest ship, Leander, Ainsworth's task group was only able to make 28 knots (52 km/h; 32 mph) while Isaki's force was cruising at about 30 knots (56 km/h; 35 mph).

As the skies began to grow overcast at 01:00 on 13 July, the Allied ships established radar contact about 20 mi (17 nmi; 32 km) east of the northern tip of Kolombangara at 7°50′S 157°21′E. Ainsworth assumed he had a complete surprise as the Japanese lacked radar, but in reality the Japanese had been aware of the Allied force for almost two hours. Despite not possessing radar, the Japanese ships could detect the electro-magnetic impulses of the Allied radar systems, and from this the Japanese crews were able to gain an accurate plot of Ainsworth's dispositions. After sighting the Japanese force at 01:03, the U.S. destroyers of McInerney's squadron increased speed to engage the Japanese force with their torpedoes while the cruisers turned to deploy their main batteries and engage to starboard. Unknown to Ainsworth, the Japanese destroyers had already launched Long Lance torpedoes, which had a longer range than the Allied torpedoes. After firing their salvoes between 01:08 and 01:14, the Japanese destroyers turned away to regroup.

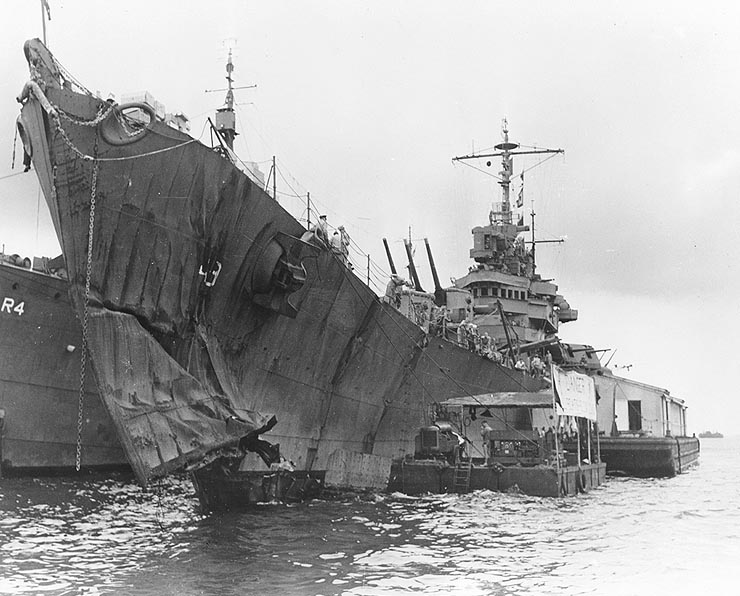
St Louis at Tulagi after being torpedoed during the battle

The first U.S. torpedoes hit the water about a minute after their Japanese counterparts, with Nicholas engaging Jintsū at a range of just under 10,000 yards (9,100 m). Jintsū turned on her searchlight and engaged the Allied ships but was subjected to concentrated Allied fire from a range of around 9,000 yards (8,200 m), with 2,630 rounds being fired under the direction of spotting aircraft overhead. After minor corrections to their fall of shot, the Japanese cruiser was heavily damaged. After losing steerage around 01:17, Jintsū came to a dead stop, was reduced to a wreck, broken in two by several torpedo hits, and sank at about 01:45, with the loss of nearly her entire crew including Isaki. On the Allied side, Leander was hit by a shell from Jintsū. The damage was light but severed radio communications. Several Japanese torpedoes were spotted, and the Allied ships began evasive action. These counter-maneuvers were hampered by faulty communications and thick gunsmoke that reduced visibility. Consequently, several ships turned wide to avoid collisions, including Leander which was struck by one of the Japanese torpedoes. Severely damaged, the New Zealand cruiser retired from the battle escorted by Radford and Jenkins. Her damage was so severe that she took no further part in the war.

Amidst the confusion of the initial battle, Ryan's destroyer squadron began its torpedo run from a distance of 7,900 yards (7,200 m), firing his first salvo around 01:12. McInerney's destroyers, except Radford and Jenkins, were detached from the task force by Ainsworth at 01:31 to pursue contacts to the west following a reconnaissance report from the supporting aircraft that indicated several destroyers were withdrawing in that direction. Meanwhile, the four Japanese destroyer-transports began to withdraw along the coast, while the four Japanese escort destroyers temporarily retired north under the command of Captain Yoshima Shimai to use the cover of a rain squall to reload their torpedo tubes, doing so in only 18 minutes. Ainsworth then pursued the Japanese destroyers with Ryan's destroyers and his own three cruisers, altering course to the northwest.

Radar contact was reestablished by the U.S. ships at 01:56, but there was uncertainty about the identity of the ships among Ainsworth's advisers. Believing that they may have been McInerney's destroyers, the U.S. ships initially held their fire while they sought to confirm the location of three detached destroyers. At 02:03, starshells were fired to illuminate the contacts that had begun to withdraw. Shortly afterward, Ainsworth deployed his ships to begin firing with their main batteries, maneuvering to starboard. In the process, they moved into the path of several torpedoes that had been fired by the Japanese destroyers before they had turned about. St. Louis and Honolulu were both struck by torpedoes and damaged, although this was not mortal. The destroyer Ralph Talbot managed to reply with a salvo of four torpedoes, but these failed to hit anything. A minute later the destroyer Gwin was also struck by a torpedo amidships, inflicting heavy damage. Despite efforts to save the ship, Gwin was scuttled at 09:30. A total of 61 men were killed on Gwin. Its surviving crew were subsequently evacuated on Ralph Talbot.

== Aftermath ==
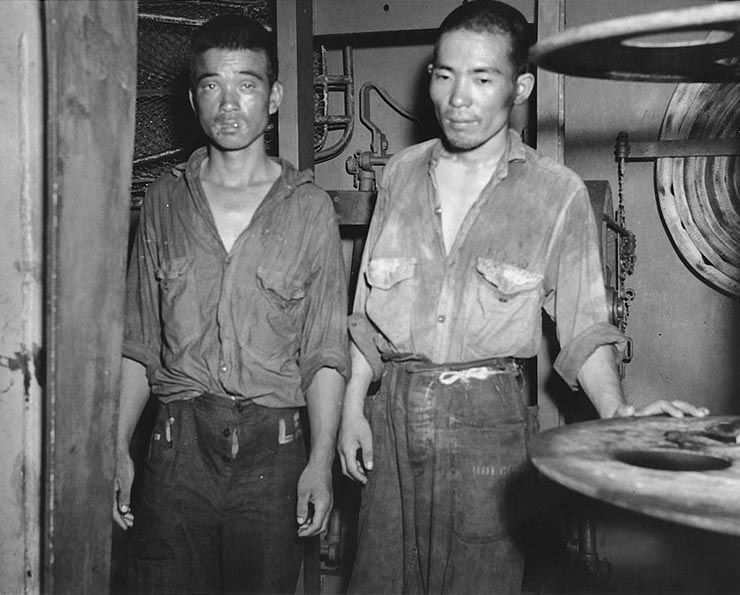
Jintsū survivors aboard USS Nicholas.

Following the battle, Ainsworth's force withdrew back to Tulagi. Sailing through The Slot in daylight risked air attack from the Japanese. As a result, Ainsworth requested air support, and a strong fighter force was provided from bases in the Russell Islands to cover the withdrawal. Early on 13 July, a force of 18 Japanese dive bombers, escorted by 20 fighters, was dispatched to attack the Allied ships, but they were turned back after clashing off Visu Visu.

Except for Jintsū, which went down with 482 men, the Japanese force escaped damage. After withdrawing along the coast, the four destroyer transports had diverted through the Vella Gulf and successfully landed 1,200 men at Sandfly Harbor on the western coast of Kolombangara. They completed unloading at 03:40 after which the Japanese ships searched for survivors from Jintsū and then returned to Buin. A total of 21 survivors from Jintsū were subsequently rescued by Japanese submarine I-180; a few others were rescued by American ships. Allied losses amounted to one destroyer sunk and three light cruisers damaged, two of which heavily. A total of 89 Allied sailors were killed, including 28 New Zealanders from Leander. Honolulu and St. Louis were out of action for several months while Leander was under repair for a year and never returned to action during World War II.

The Japanese had won a tactical victory and had demonstrated that they possessed superior night-fighting techniques, but of the action the naval historian Samuel Eliot Morison writes: "A string of such victories add[ed] up to defeat." Paul Dull further describes the battle as one in a "series of Pyrrhic victories for the Japanese" as they were unable to match the capacity of U.S. industry to replace their losses. Ainsworth's force was unable to prevent the flow of Japanese reinforcements south as the lines between Bairoko and the Diamond Narrows remained open. Nevertheless, strategically the battle forced a change in Japanese tactics. Combined with the earlier Battle of Kula Gulf, the engagement deterred the Japanese from future use of the Kula Gulf to reinforce Munda. The Allied naval commander, Admiral Chester Nimitz, also changed tactics, deciding that the use of cruisers in the confined waters around the Solomon Islands was too dangerous and ineffective. Meanwhile, for the Japanese destroyer losses necessitated the use of Daihatsu barges to move reinforcements between the Shortland Islands and the Kula Gulf. Consequently, the U.S. Navy concentrated responsibility for its interdiction efforts on its destroyer force and PT boats.

Throughout July and into early August, a series of nightly actions took place involving by U.S. destroyers, PT boats and aircraft against the Japanese reinforcement efforts. The most significant action during this time came on the night of 19/20 July, when a force of 11 ships, consisting of cruisers and destroyers under Rear Admiral Shoji Nishimura, was detected by U.S. aircraft in The Slot. At least one destroyer, Yugure, was sunk, and the cruiser Kumano was damaged, while four U.S. aircraft were lost. After this, the Japanese chose to use the Vella Gulf and the Blackett Strait along the western coast of Kolombangara rather than the direct route through the Kula Gulf. This resulted in the Battle of Vella Gulf and Battle off Horaniu in early August. In late September and early October, the Japanese began evacuating their ground troops from Kolombangara. A series of interdiction actions took place during which the U.S. Navy claimed to have sunk 46 barges, killing thousands of Japanese troops. Another action was fought between Japanese and U.S. destroyers off Kolombangara on the night of 2–3 October during which both sides ineffectively exchanged torpedoes and gunfire.
