= Huangpu River =

Large tributary of the Yangtze

Huangpu River Whangpoo River Pu Jiang (浦江) Chunshen Jiang (春申江) Shen Jiang (申江)
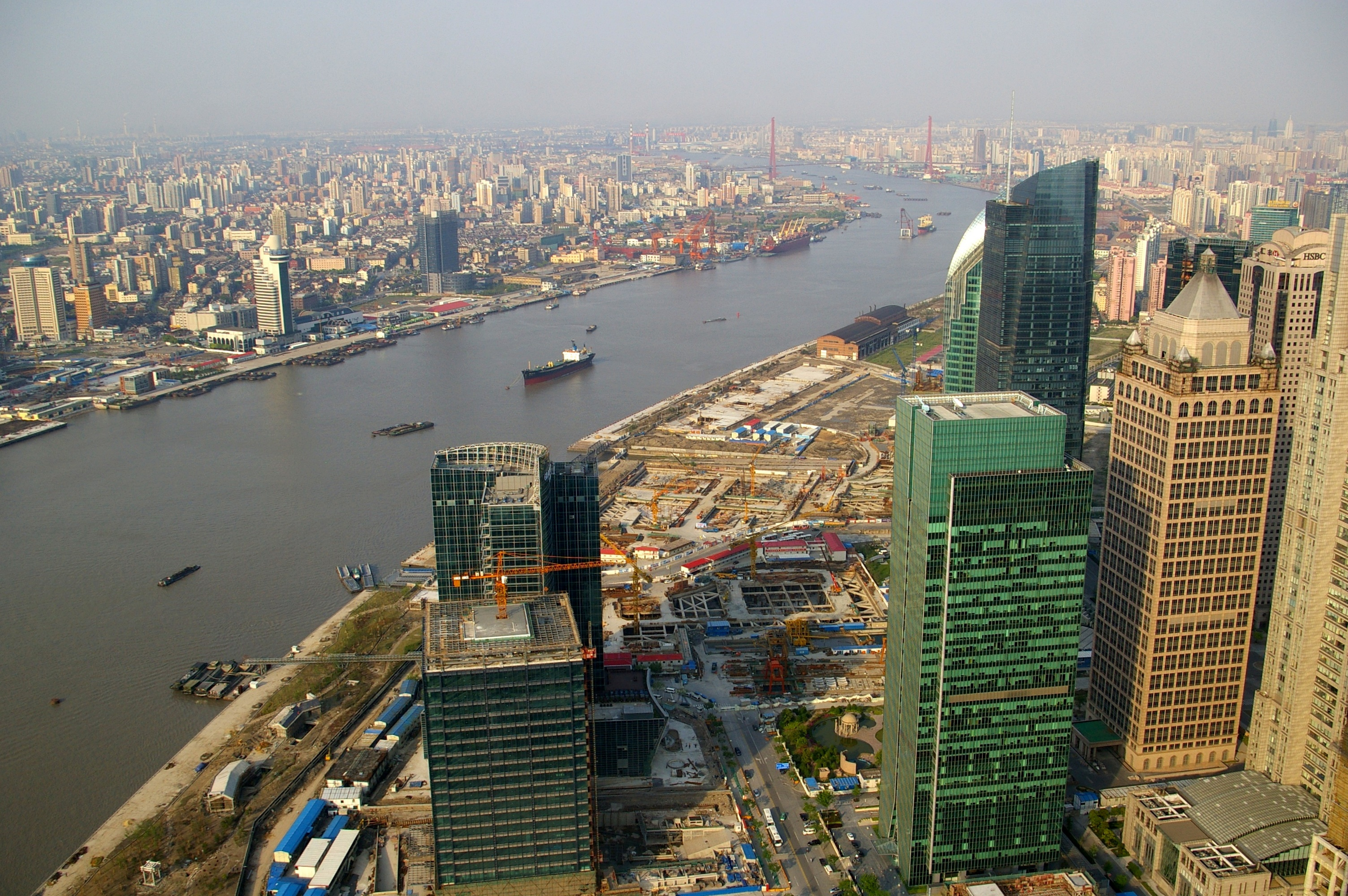
- A view of the Huangpu River as it flows through downtown Shanghai.

- Location of mouth in Shanghai
- Native name: 黄浦江 (Chinese)

Location
- Country: China
- Municipality: Shanghai

Physical characteristics
- Source: Dianshan Lake
  - location: Qingpu, Shanghai, China
- Mouth: Yangtze River
  - location: Baoshan, Shanghai, China
  - coordinates: 31°23′33″N 121°30′54″E
- Length: 113 km (70 mi)
- Discharge
  - average: 180 m^{3}/s (6,400 cu ft/s)

Basin features
- Tributaries
  - left: Suzhou Creek

Huangpu River
- Simplified Chinese: 黄浦江
- Traditional Chinese: 黃浦江
- Postal: Whangpoo River
Transcriptions
Standard Mandarin
- Hanyu Pinyin: Huángpǔ Jiāng
- Wade–Giles: Huang-p'u Chiang

The Huangpu, formerly romanized as Whangpoo, is a 113 km-long (70 mi) river flowing north through Shanghai, into the Yangtze estuary. The Bund and Lujiazui are located along the Huangpu River.

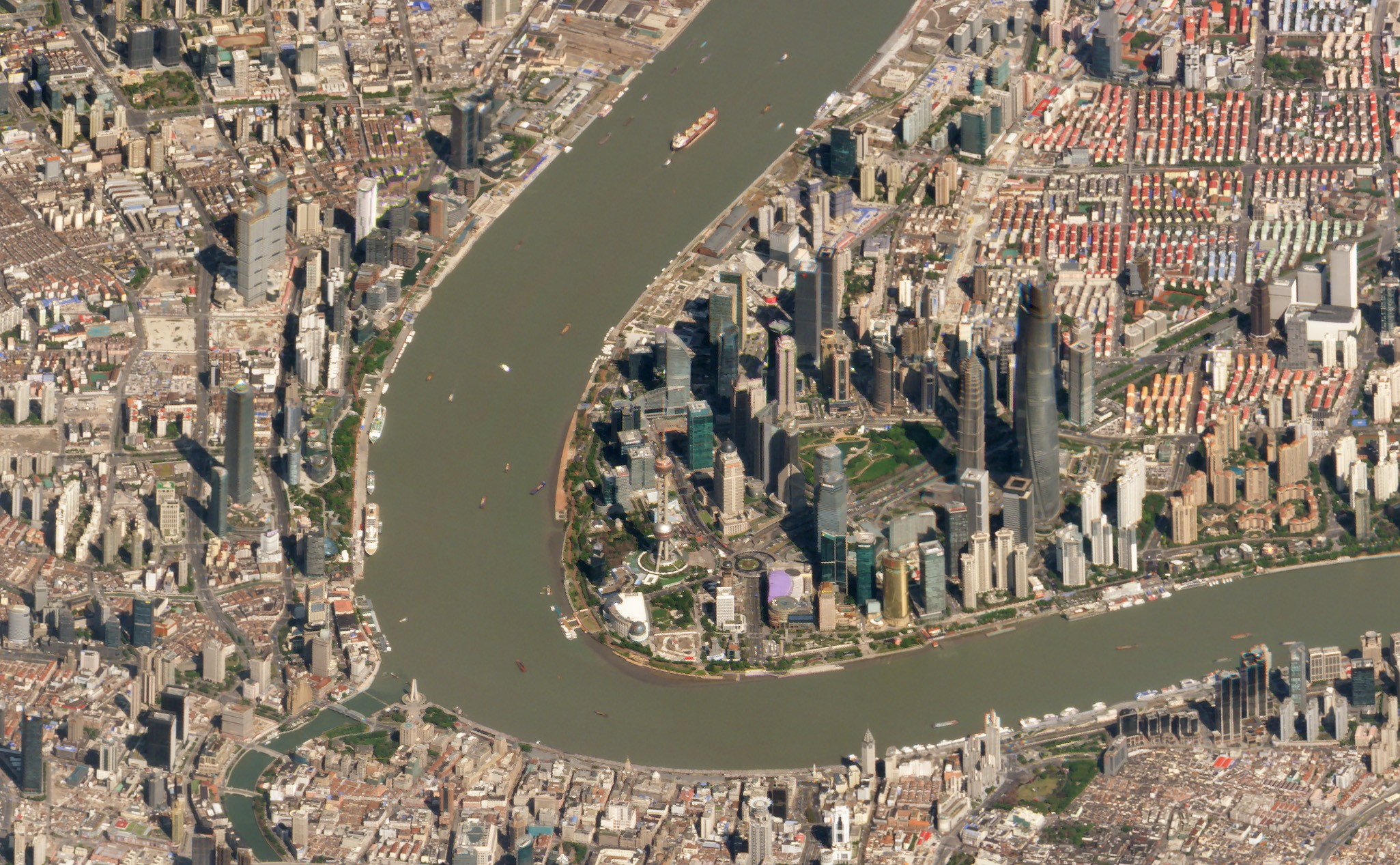
Satellite image of the Huangpu River near its confluence with Suzhou Creek on the west bank (left) and the Lujiazui area (right) on the east bank

The Huangpu is the biggest river in central Shanghai, with the Suzhou Creek being its major tributary. It is on average 400 m (1,312 ft) wide and 9 m (30 ft) deep, and divides the city into two regions: Puxi ("west of Huangpu"), the traditional city center, and Pudong ("east of Huangpu").

== Bridges ==
- Fengpu Bridge
- Lupu Bridge, opened 2003.
- Minpu Bridge
- Minpu Bridge No. 2
  - The lower deck of this bridge carries Line 5 across the Huangpu River. This is the first line of the Shanghai Metro to cross the river via a bridge.
- Minpu Bridge No. 3
- Nanpu Bridge, opened 1991.
- Songpu Bridge, opened 1975 railway, 1976 highway.
- Songpu Bridge No. 2
- Songpu Bridge No. 3
- Xupu Bridge, opened 1997.
- Yangpu Bridge, opened 1993.

The following roadways, highways, and railways also cross the Huangpu River via a bridge:

- G1503 Shanghai Ring Expressway
- G50 Shanghai–Chongqing Expressway
- G60 Shanghai–Kunming Expressway
- Zhufeng Highway
- Huqingping Highway
- Shanghai–Hangzhou railway

== Tunnels ==
A number of lines of the Shanghai Metro cross underneath the river. From north to south geographically, these are Line 10, Line 12, Line 18, Line 4 (first crossing), Line 2, Line 14, Line 9, Line 4 (second crossing), Line 8, Line 13, Line 7, Line 11, and Line 5.

There are several roadways which cross the Huangpu river via a tunnel, including:

- Changjiang Road tunnel
- Dalian Road tunnel
- Dapu Road tunnel
- East Fuxing Road tunnel
- East Yan'an Road tunnel
- Jiangpu Road tunnel
- Jiaohuan tunnel (Suburb Ring Expressway tunnel)
- Jungong Road tunnel
- Longyao Road tunnel
- Renmin Road tunnel
- Shangzhong Road tunnel
- South Hongmei Road tunnel
- South Xizang Road tunnel
- Waihuan tunnel (Outer Ring Expressway tunnel)
- Xiangyin Road tunnel
- Xinjian Road tunnel
- Yindu Road tunnel
- Zhoujiazui Road tunnel

Additionally, the Bund Sightseeing Tunnel is a tourist attraction (not a roadway) that also crosses the Huangpu river.

== Ferries ==
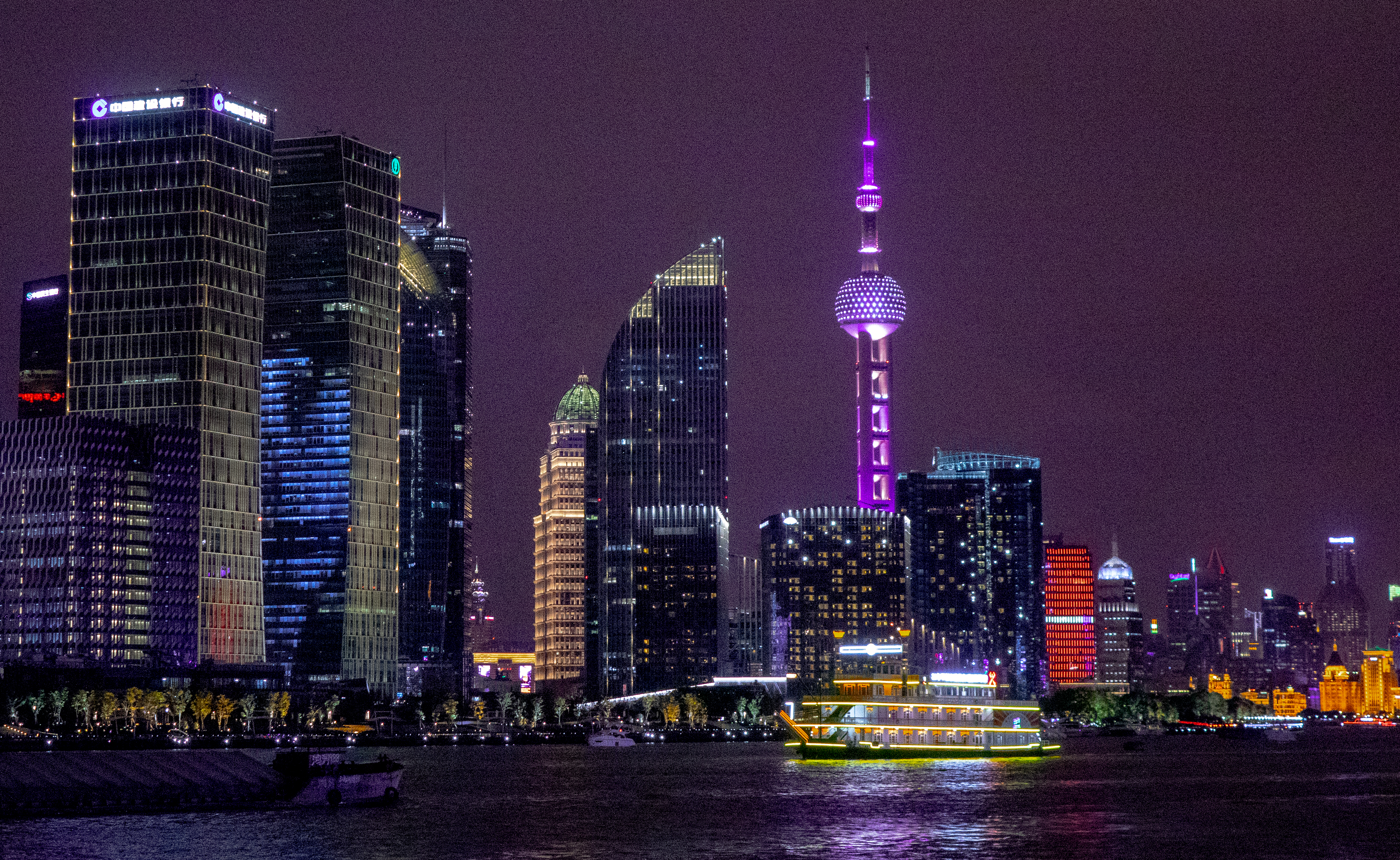
Tour boat on the river at Pudong

There are currently several ferry lines operated by Shanghai Ferry. Numerous tour boats also ply the harbour in the Pudong area.

== Controversy ==
In March 2013, some 16,000 pig carcasses were found floating in the Huangpu River in Shanghai. Some of the pigs carried ear tags saying they were from Jiaxing, so that city in Zhejiang may be the source; one news agency indicates that dead pigs are often dumped into rivers in China to avoid the disposal cost. However, local farmers deny the dumping allegation.

== See also ==
- Geography of China
- List of rivers in China
