= S2 Shanghai–Luchaogang Expressway =

Road in Shanghai, China

Shanghai–Luchaogang Expressway
- Hulu Expressway 沪芦高速公路

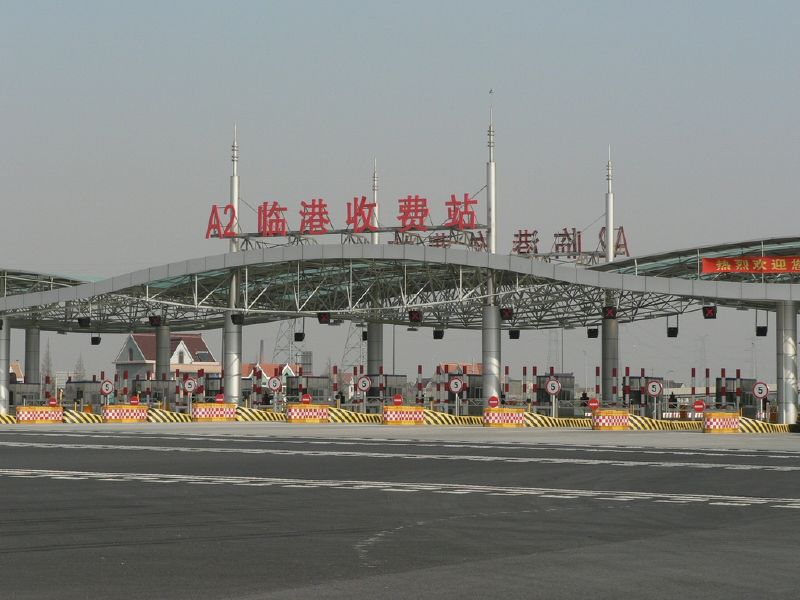
- The toll station at Lingang New Area before the Donghai Bridge. Note the sign showing the old designation of the expressway, A2.

Route information
- Length: 42.31 km (26.29 mi) Length excludes the Donghai Bridge.

Major junctions
- From: Shanghai S1 / Shanghai S20 in Pudong New Area, Shanghai
- Shanghai S32 in Pudong New Area; G1503 in Pudong New Area
- To: Lingang New City, Pudong New Area, Shanghai

Location
- Country: China
- Province: Shanghai

Highway system
- Transport in China
← S1	→ S3

The Shanghai–Luchaogang Expressway, commonly referred to as the Hulu Expressway (Chinese: 沪芦高速公路; pinyin: Hùlú Gāosù Gōnglù) and designated S2, is a 42.31-kilometre-long expressway (26.29 mi) in the city of Shanghai, China. The entire route runs within Pudong New Area in the city of Shanghai, and was originally designated A2.

== Route ==
The Shanghai–Luchaogang Expressway runs in Pudong New Area for its entirety. It begins at the Outer Ring Yingbin Expressway Interchange, an interchange with S1 Yingbin Expressway and S20 Outer Ring Expressway. It travels southward, meeting the Shanghai–Jiaxing–Huzhou Expressway, and then curves southeastward to meet the G1503 Shanghai Ring Expressway. It ends at Lingang New City on the southeastern coast of Shanghai, just before the Donghai Bridge. The Donghai Bridge connects Shanghai to Yangshan Port, a deep-water port administered by Shengsi County, Zhoushan, Zhejiang in Hangzhou Bay.

== Exit list ==
Location	km	mi	Exit	Name	Destinations	Notes
Shanghai S2 (Shanghai–Luchaogang Expressway)
Pudong New Area, Shanghai	0	0	27	Outer Ring Yingbin Expressway Interchange	Shanghai S1 / Shanghai S20	
Pudong New Area, Shanghai	Kangqiao Toll Booth					
Pudong New Area, Shanghai			34	Shanghai S32 – Jiaxing, Pudong International Airport		
Pudong New Area, Shanghai			41	Shanghai S122 (Hunan Highway)		
Pudong New Area, Shanghai			46	Shanghai S324 (Daye Highway)		
Pudong New Area, Shanghai			52	Xinsiping Highway		
Pudong New Area, Shanghai			57	Dating Interchange	G1503 – Jiaxing, Pudong International Airport	
Pudong New Area, Shanghai	Lingang Service Area					
Pudong New Area, Shanghai			62	Shanghai S222 (Nanlu Highway)		
Pudong New Area, Shanghai	Lingang Toll Booth					
Pudong New Area, Shanghai			67	Lianggang Avenue; Lingang Industrial Area		
Pudong New Area, Shanghai				Dishui Lake; Shunxiang Road; Hucheng Ring Road; Tongshun Avenue		Northbound exit only
Pudong New Area, Shanghai				Shuntong Road; Yangshan Port Community Management Committee		Southbound exit only
Continues south to Donghai Bridge
Closed/former; Concurrency terminus; HOV only; Incomplete access; Tolled; Route transition; Unopened
