= Land reclamation in China =

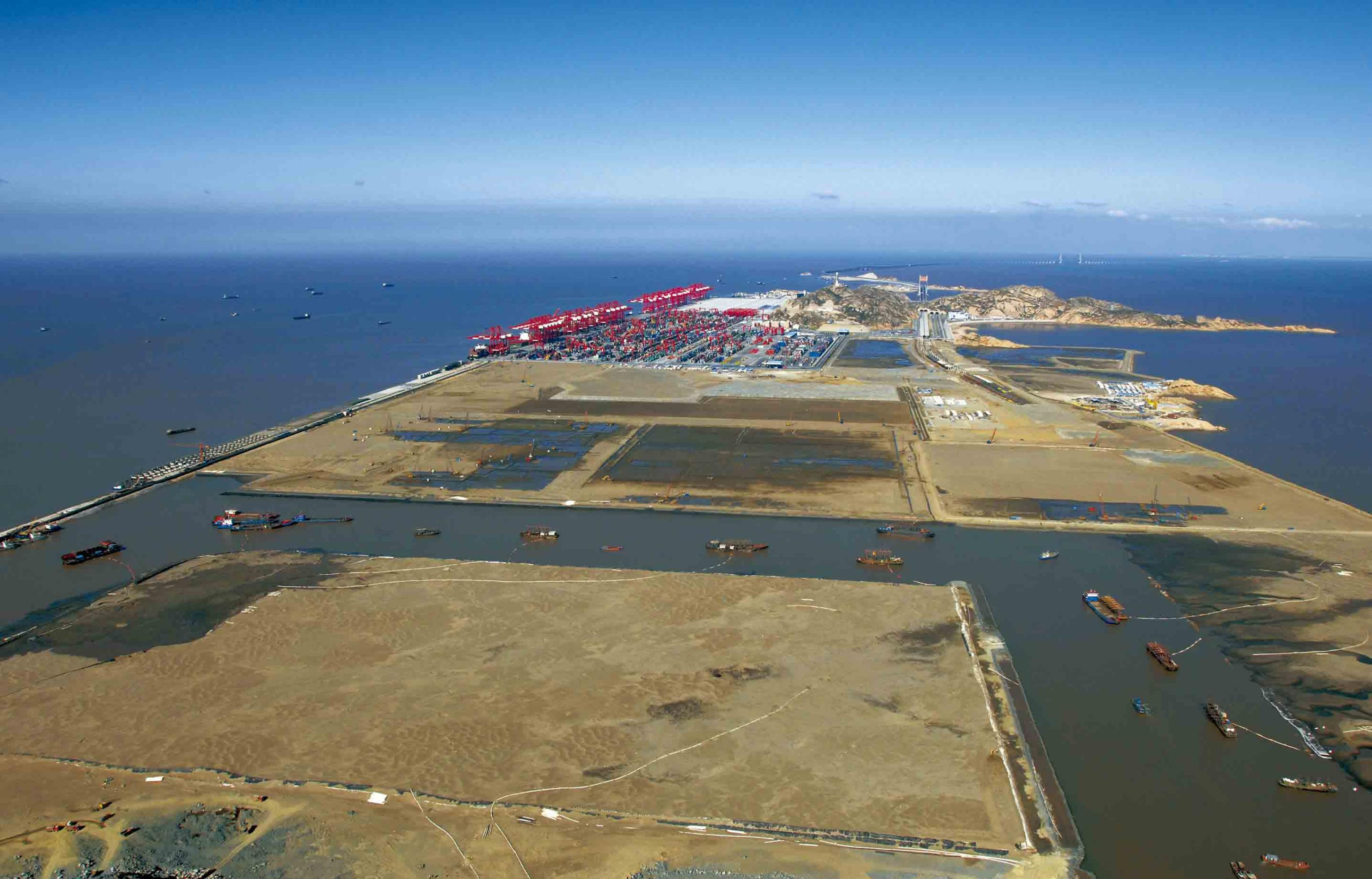
Land reclamation of Yangshan Deepwater Port in Shanghai, and the Donghai Bridge can be seen in the distance.

Since 1949, China has carried out extensive land reclamation projects. It is among the countries which have built the most artificial land; from 1949 to 1990s, the total area of land reclaimed from the sea of China was about 13,000 km^{2}.

== Mainland China ==
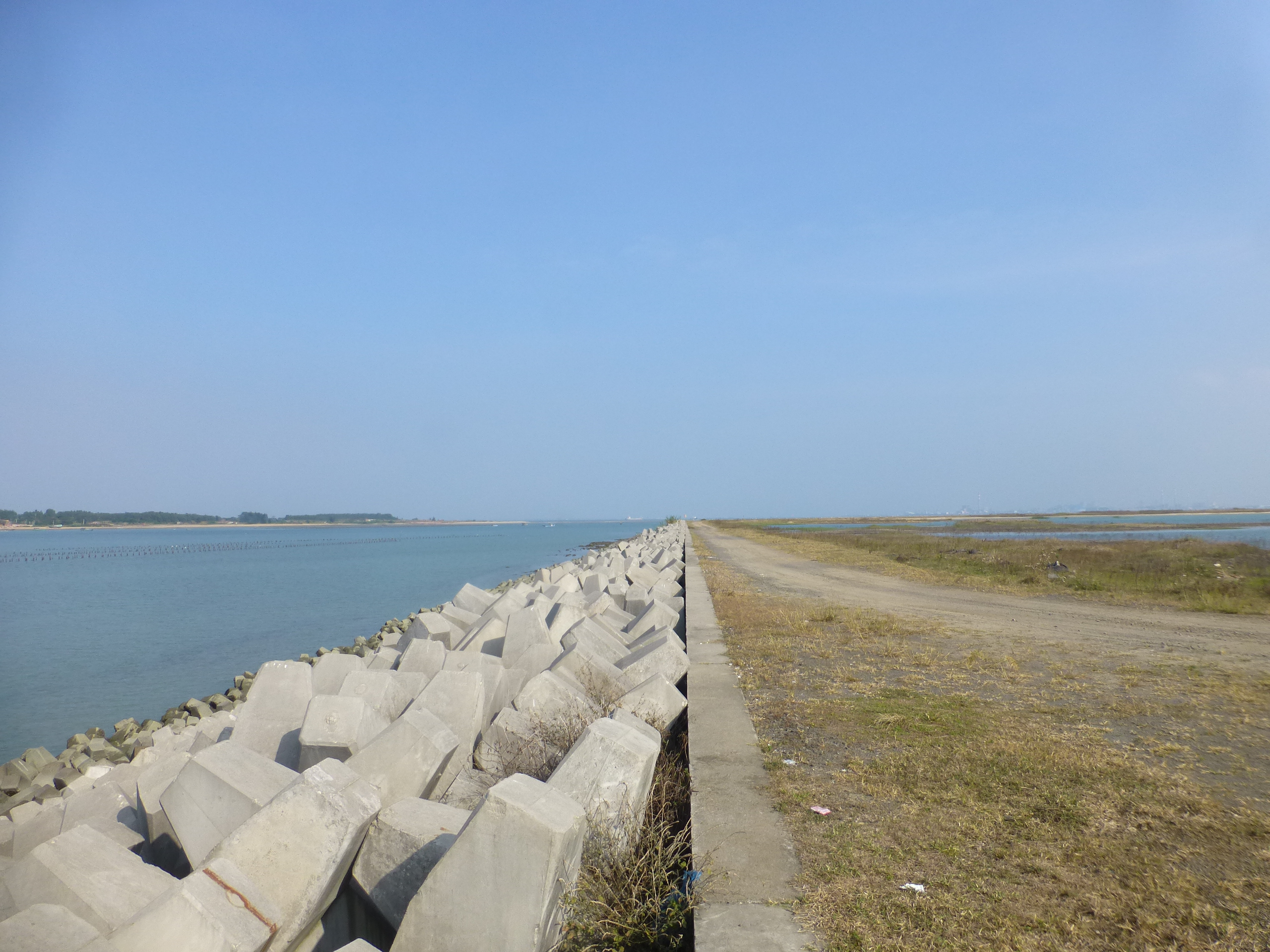
A dike protecting newly reclaimed land (on the right) on the north shore of Donghai Island, Guangdong

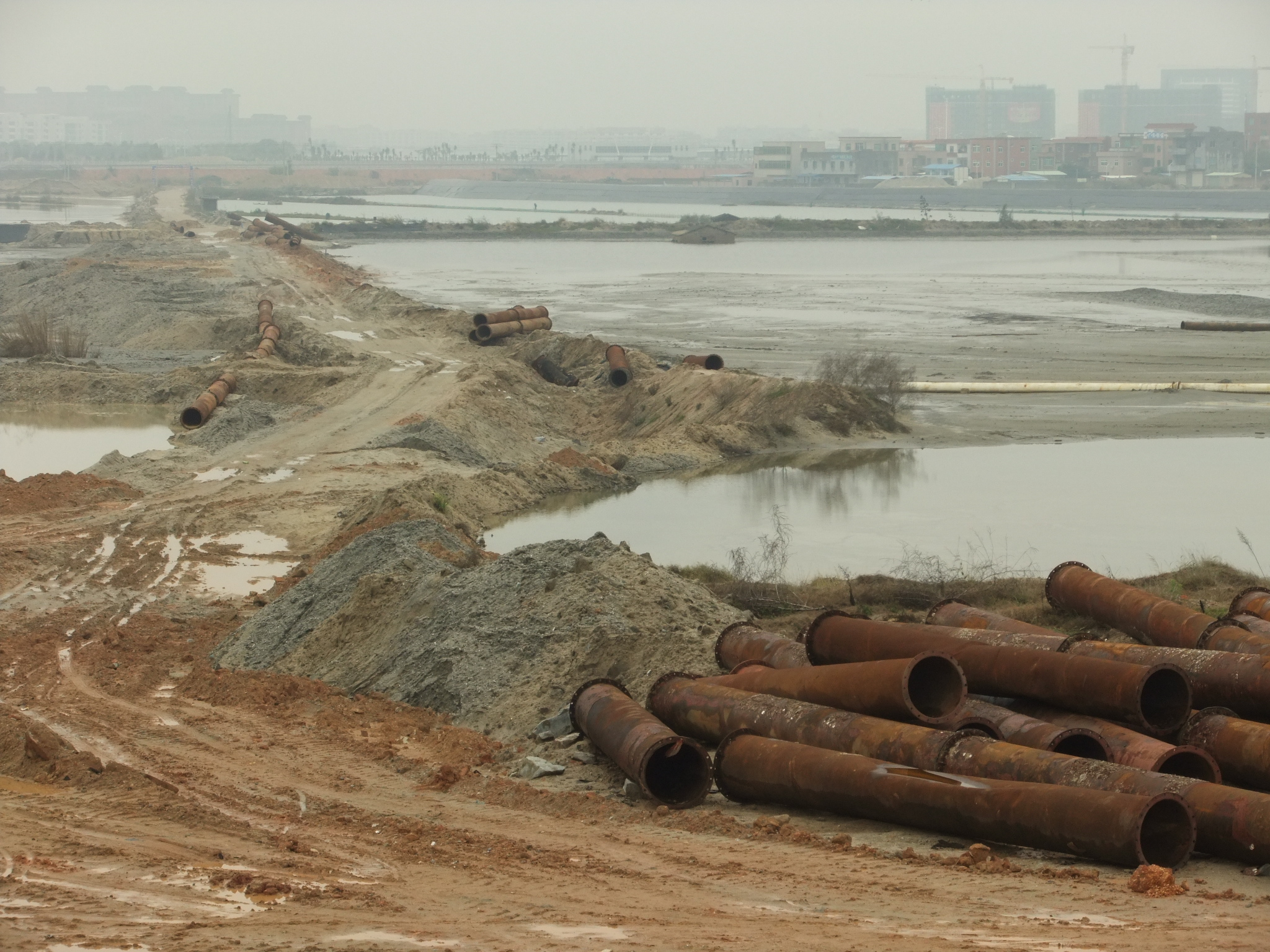
A land reclamation project in progress in Xiamen

A grand total of 150 km^{2} was planned to be reclaimed from the sea in 2009.

=== Guangdong ===
From June 2004 to the present, land reclamation is going on at Shantou. Project surface to reclaim is 146 km^{2}.

In 2020, Tencent announced its smart city-style urban development dubbed Net City, which will be built on reclaimed land in Shenzhen.

=== Jiangsu ===
Between 2009 and 2020, Jiangsu will reclaim 21 parcels of tidal areas along the southern Yellow Sea, yielding a total of 1,818 square km of new land.

=== Liaoning ===
Starting in March 2005, the Caofeidian Land Reclamation Project (曹妃甸围海造地工程) reclaimed a total of 310 km^{2} next to the island of Tangshan. The first stage of 12 km^{2} was finished on 28 March 2006. The plan is to make space for the new industrial base of Shougang.

=== Shanghai ===
Land reclamation on Chongming Island, particularly large-scale work on its northern and eastern tidal flats in the 1960s and 1990s, doubled the size of the island between 1950 and 2010.

Between 2003 and 2006, the Shanghai government spent 40 billion yuan on the Nanhui New City, formerly called Lingang New City Project (临港新城计划) and part of Shanghai's initiative of One City, Nine Towns, to reclaim 133.3 km^{2} of artificial land from the sea.

=== Zhejiang ===
Starting in 1975, the largest single land reclamation project in Zhejiang Province has been the Xuanmen Land Reclamation Project (漩门围垦工程) in Yuhuan County. It has three phases, of which phase II covered 53.3 km^{2} (February 1999 - April 2001), and phase III 45.3 km^{2} (March 2006 - 2010).

- Total land reclamation in the area of Taizhou City between 2004 and 2010, including the project mentioned above, will be 266.7 km^{2}.

== Special Administrative Regions ==
=== Hong Kong ===
The government of Hong Kong started reclaiming land from the surrounding sea as early as the 1840s. Formal reclamation starts at 1860s and its land reclamation is still proceeding. A notable achievement is Hong Kong International Airport, built in the 1990s on reclaimed land, absorbing the former islands Chek Lap Kok and Lam Chau.

The Shenzhen river (between Hong Kong and mainland China) has been channelised through land reclamation projects.

=== Macau ===
Macau has been the site of land reclamation projects for several hundred years. As of 2023, more than half of Macau is composed to reclaimed land.

Macau's Cotai Strip was built upon a 5.2 square kilometer land reclamation site in the Seac Pai Bay of the Pearl River Estuary. The strip joins the formerly separate islands of Taipa and Coloane. The Cotai Strip is a gambling and shopping area which includes a dozen multibillion-dollar resorts, a private university campus, and the Macau garrison of the People's Liberation Army.

== South China Sea ==
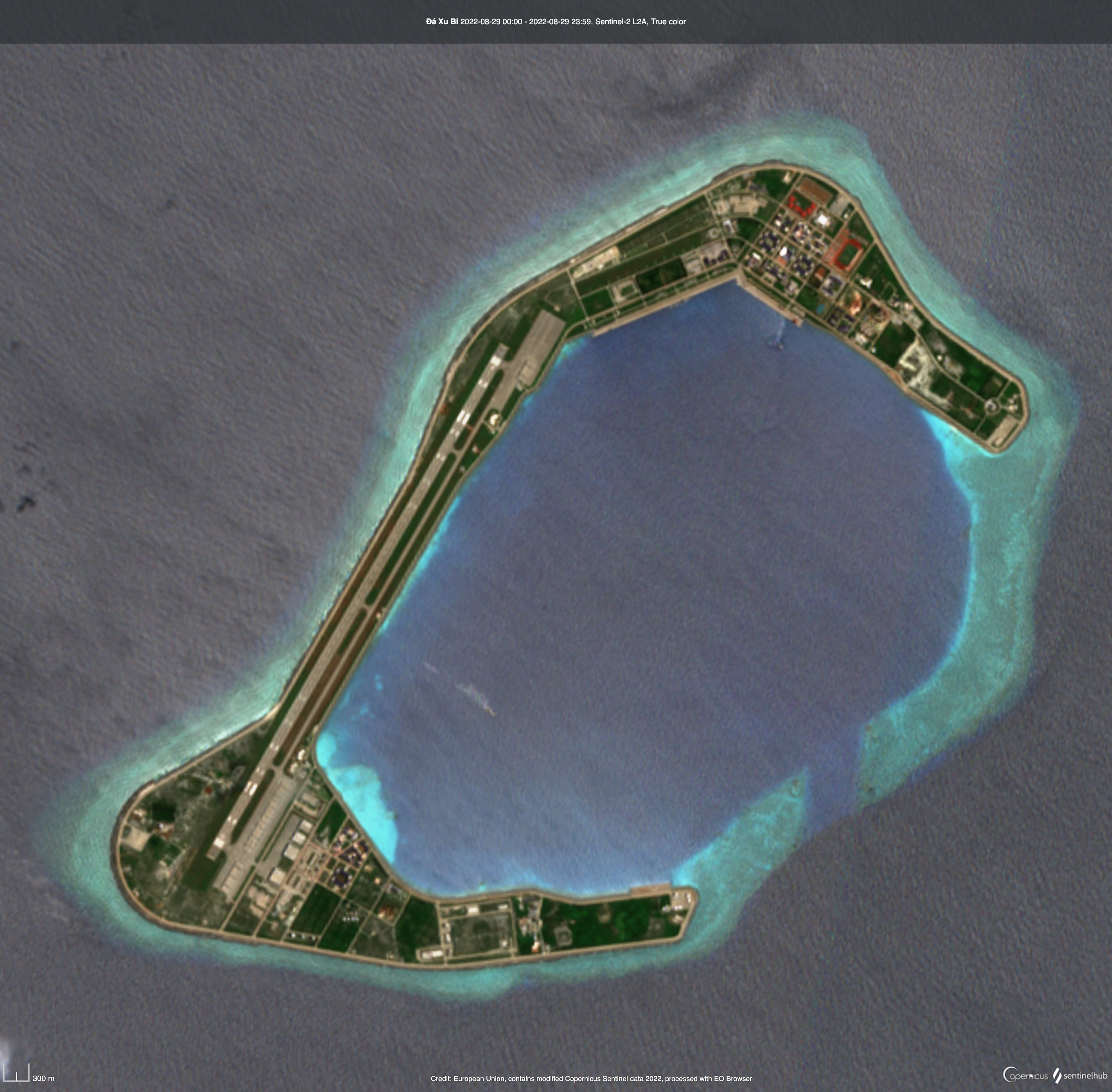
Subi Reef (4.2 km^{2}) in 2022

In the 21st century, the PRC has upheld the 1947 claims of the Republic of China (modified by Zhou Enlai into a nine-dash line) over most of the South China Sea through a series of disputed mid-ocean land reclamation projects in the Spratly Islands known as the Great Wall of Sand. China was motivated to begin land reclamation projects in the Spratlys because it had relatively little land in the area.

The islands being expanded or created by the project are notionally administered as parts of Sansha in Hainan Province. As of December 2016, the projects in the Spratlys covered 3,200 acres (1,300 ha) of land protected by "'significant' weapons systems, including anti-aircraft and anti-missile systems".

== See also ==
- Land rehabilitation
- Land improvement
- United States Bureau of Reclamation
- Society for Protection of the Harbor
- Territorial changes of the People's Republic of China
- Polder - low-lying land reclaimed from a lake or sea
- Soil salinity control - reclamation of saline land
- Watertable control - reclamation of waterlogged land
- Drainage system (agriculture) - drainage for land reclamation
