= S19 Xinnong–Jinshanwei Expressway =

Road in Shanghai, China

Xinnong–Jinshanwei Expressway
- Xinwei Expressway 新卫高速公路

Route information
- Length: 18.96 km (11.78 mi)

Major junctions
- From: G1501 / Shanghai S36 in Xinnong, Jinshan District
- To: Shanghai S301 (Xinwei Highway) in Jinshanwei, Jinshan District

Location
- Country: China
- Province: Shanghai

Highway system
- Transport in China
| ← S7 | → S20 |

The Xinnong–Jinshanwei Expressway (Chinese: 新农–金山卫高速公路), commonly referred to as the Xinwei Expressway (Chinese: 新卫高速公路) and designated S19, is a 18.96-kilometre-long expressway (11.78 mi) in Shanghai, China. It runs entirely within Jinshan District, between the towns of Xinnong to the north and Jinshanwei to the south, which give the expressway its name. It was formerly designated as A6.

== Route ==
The Xinnong–Jinshanwei Expressway is a north-south expressway located entirely in Jinshan District. It begins at the Xinnong Interchange, an interchange with G1501 Shanghai Ring Expressway to the north and east and S36 Tinglin–Fengjing Expressway to the west. It proceeds south to an interchange with G15 Shenyang–Haikou Expressway near Jinshanwei. A short segment of the expressway continues beyond the interchange to a toll booth, where the expressway terminates and becomes Xinwei Highway.

== Exit list ==
| Location | km | mi | Exit | Name | Destinations | Notes |
Shanghai S19 (Xinnong–Jinshanwei Expressway)
| Jinshan District, Shanghai | 0 | 0 | 0 | Xinnong Interchange | G1501 / Shanghai S36 – Jiaxing, Zhujing Town, Donghai Bridge | |
| Jinshan District, Shanghai | | | 5 | Lüxiang | Rongchang Road; Zhulü Highway | |
| Jinshan District, Shanghai | | | 11 | Zhangyan/Langxia | Jinzhang Feeder Road; Caolang Highway | |
| Jinshan District, Shanghai | | | 18 | Jinshanwei Interchange | G15 – Nantong, Ningbo, Shanghai City Center | |
| Jinshan District, Shanghai | Jinshanwei Toll Booth | | | | | |
| Jinshan District, Shanghai | | | | Jinshanwei | Shanghai S301 (Xinwei Highway) | |
Closed/former; Concurrency terminus; HOV only; Incomplete access; Tolled; Route transition; Unopened
