= Shengsi =

Shengsi may refer to:

- Shengsi County, in Zhejiang, China
- Shengsi Islands, in Zhoushan, Zhejiang, China
