= Sijiao =

Sijiao may refer to:

- Dead End (1969 film) (死角; Sǐjiǎo), Hong Kong film
- Sijiao Island, in Zhoushan, Zhejiang, China
