= Mazhang, Zhanjiang =

Mazhang 麻章区
- District
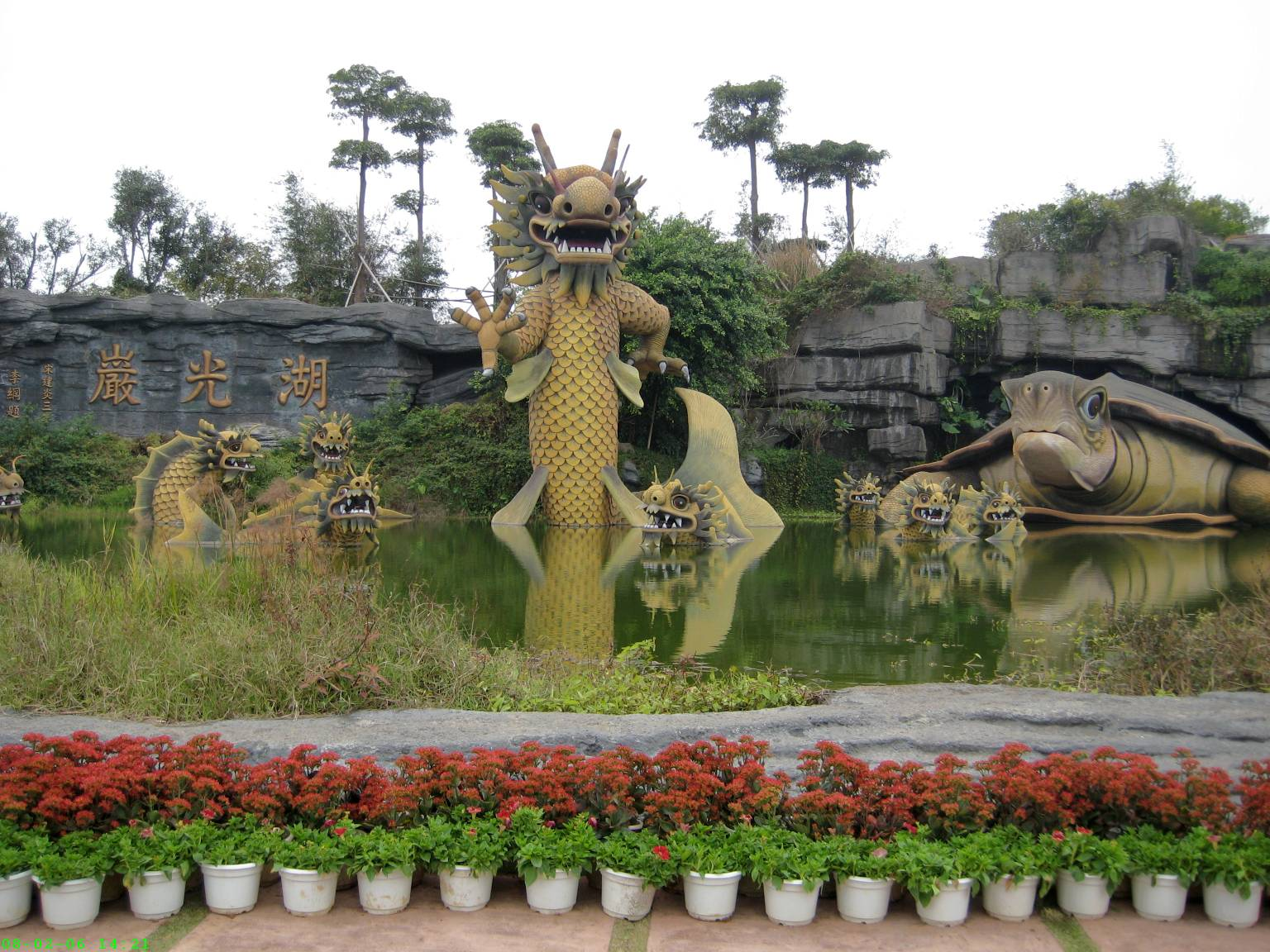
- Huguangyan Scenic Area

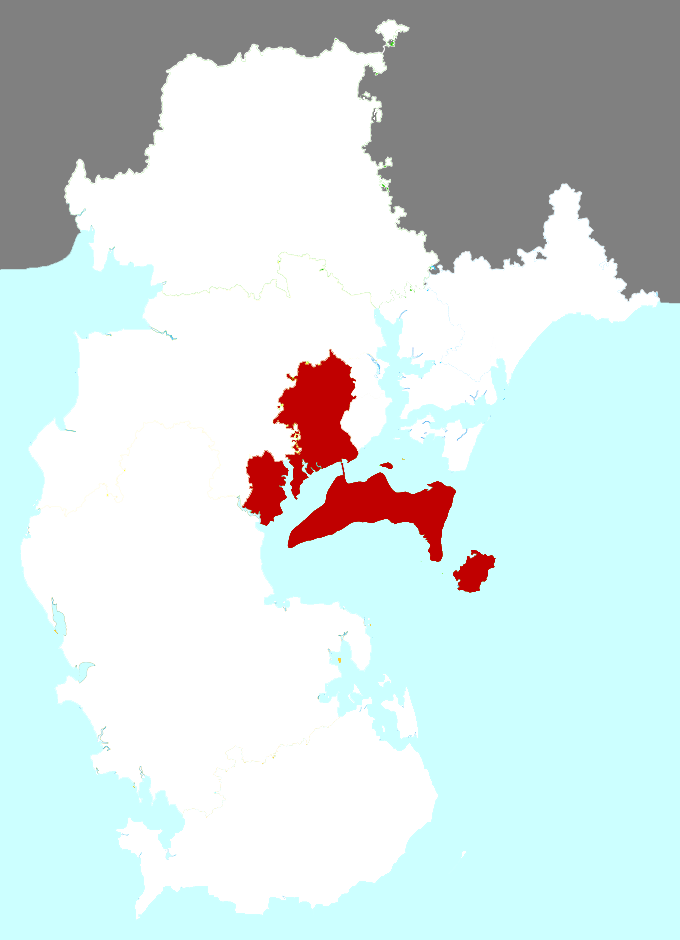
- Location of Mazhang in Zhanjiang

- Location in Guangdong Mazhang (Eastern China) Mazhang (China)
- Coordinates: 21°15′49″N 110°20′01″E
- Country: People's Republic of China
- Province: Guangdong
- Prefecture-level city: Zhanjiang

Area
  - Total: 769 km^{2} (297 sq mi)

Population (2020)
  - Total: 578,027
  - Density: 752/km^{2} (1,950/sq mi)
- Time zone: UTC+8 (China Standard)

Mazhang (Chinese: 麻章; pinyin: Mázhāng; Leizhou Min: Môu-chiong) is a district of Zhanjiang, Guangdong Province, China. It has mineral water resources and some well-known springs.

== See also ==
- Donghai Island
- Naozhou Island
