= Sijiao Island =

Largest of the Shengsi Islands, China

Coordinates: 30°42′44″N 122°27′2″E

Native name: 泗礁山岛
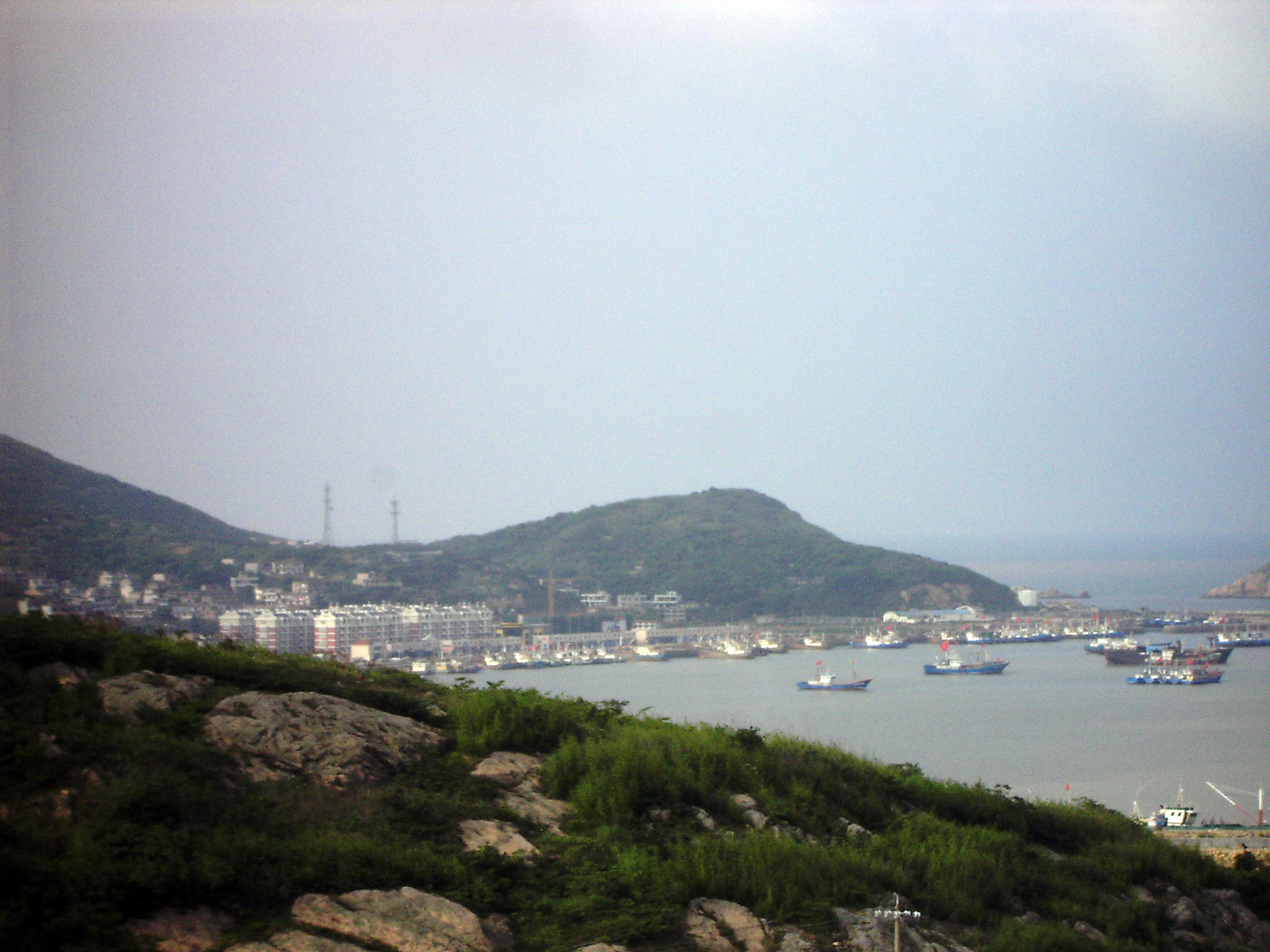

Geography
- Area: 21.2 km^{2} (8.2 sq mi)

The Sijiao Island (Chinese: 泗礁山; pinyin: Sìjiāoshān) is the largest island in the Shengsi Islands (嵊泗列岛) with an area of 21.2 km^{2}. The island has a subtropical climate with the yearly average temperature of 15.8 °C. It is administrated by Shengsi County (嵊泗县), a part of Zhoushan Prefecture (舟山地区) of China.

== Tourism ==
There are regular ferry lines from Shanghai Wusong, Shiliupu and Luchao Ports operating several times a day. The average travel time from Shanghai is about 5 hours. The island is a touristic destination offering sea bathing.
