= Shengsi Islands =

Islands in Zhejiang, China

Coordinates: 30°43′N 122°27′E

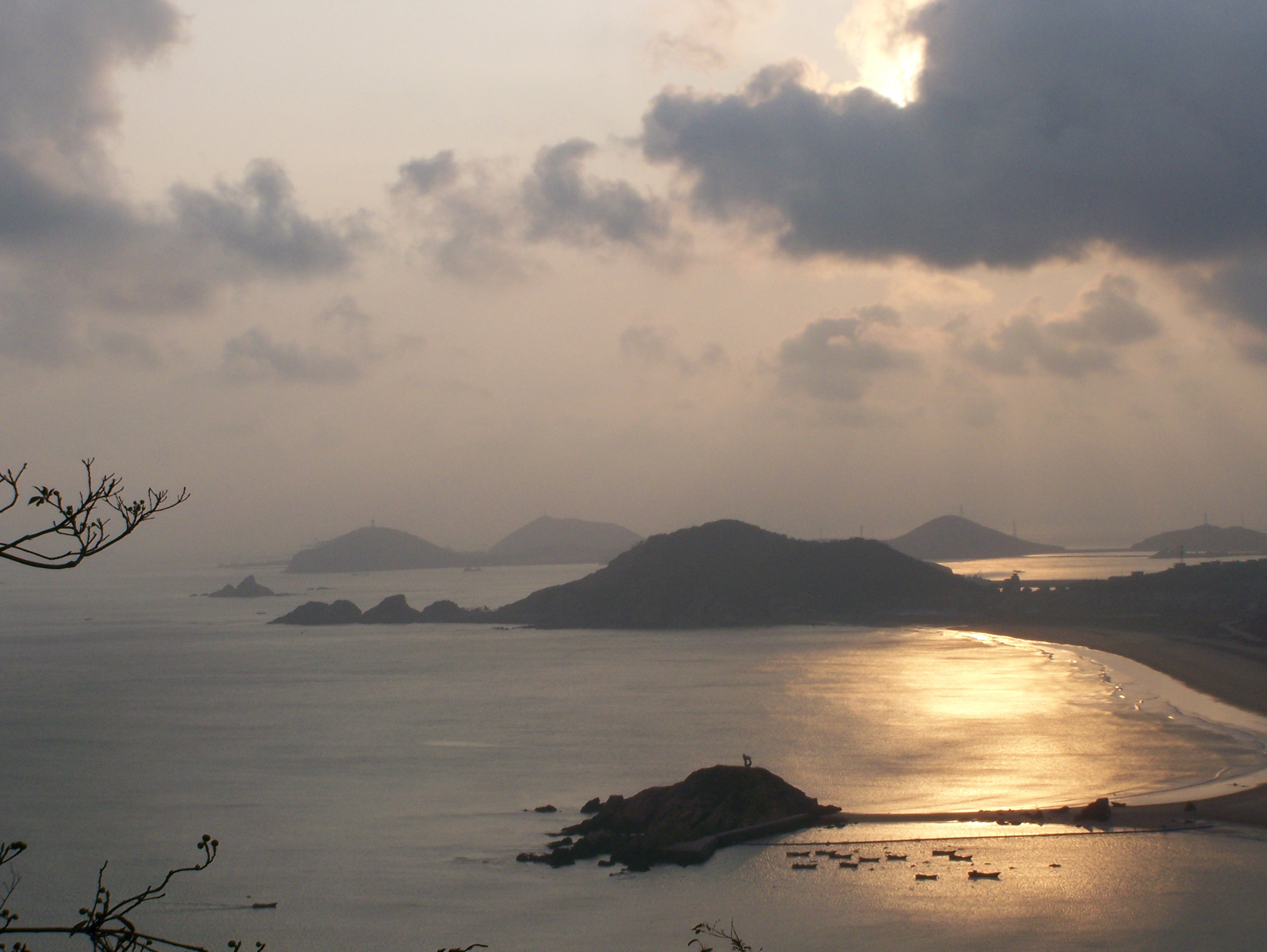
Shengsi Islands

The Shengsi Islands or Archipelago (simplified Chinese: 嵊泗列岛; traditional Chinese: 嵊泗列島; pinyin: Shèngsìlièdǎo) are part of the Zhoushan Archipelago and located south of the mouth of the Yangtze (east of Hangzhou Bay). They comprise 394 islands, each with an area larger than 500 square metres (5,400 sq ft), but of which just 18 are inhabitable. The largest island is Sijiao Island with an area of 21.2 square kilometres (8.2 sq mi).

The islands are administered by Shengsi County of Zhoushan City. The islands have a subtropical climate, with yearly average temperature of 15.8 °C (60.4 °F). The area is also notable as tourist destination and a fishery that attracts more than 100,000 fishermen every winter.

== See also ==
- Houtouwan, abandoned village on Shengshan Island, now a tourist attraction
- Majishan, one of the Shengsi Islands
