= S36 Tinglin–Fengjing Expressway =

Road in Shanghai, China

Tinglin–Fengjing Expressway
- Tingfeng Expressway 亭枫高速公路

Route information
- Length: 22 km (14 mi)

Major junctions
- From: G1503 / Shanghai S19 in Xinnong, Jinshan District
- To: G60 (Xinwei Highway) in Fengjing, Shanghai-Zhejiang boundary

Location
- Country: China
- Province: Shanghai

Highway system
- Transport in China
← S32

The Tinglin–Fengjing Expressway (Chinese: 亭林－枫泾高速公路), commonly referred to as the Tingfeng Expressway (Chinese: 亭枫高速公路) and designated S36, is a 22-kilometre-long expressway (14 mi) in Shanghai, China. It runs from Jinshan District to the Shanghai-Zhejiang boundary.

== History ==
The first section from Xinnong to Xingta was opened to traffic on 23 December 2005, and the second section west of Xingta is 7.65 kilometres (4.75 mi) in length, which was completed and opened to traffic on 28 July 2006. It was formerly designated as A7.

== Exit list ==
Location	km	mi	Exit	Name	Destinations	Notes
Shanghai S36 (Tinglin–Fengjing Expressway)
Jinshan District, Shanghai	0	0		Xinnong Interchange	G1503 / Shanghai S19	
Jinshan District, Shanghai	4	2.5		Zhujing	Shenpujing South Road; Zhongyi Street; Democracy Center Road	
Jinshan District, Shanghai	13	8.1		Xingta	Xingxin Highway	
Jinshan District, Shanghai	Fengjing Toll Booth					
Shanghai and Zhejiang	20	12		Shanghai-Zhejiang boundary		
Jiaxing, Jiashan County, Zhejiang	22	14		Tingfeng Interchange	G60	
Closed/former; Concurrency terminus; HOV only; Incomplete access; Tolled; Route transition; Unopened
