= Naozhou Island =

Island in South China Sea

Coordinates: 20.907°N 110.595°E

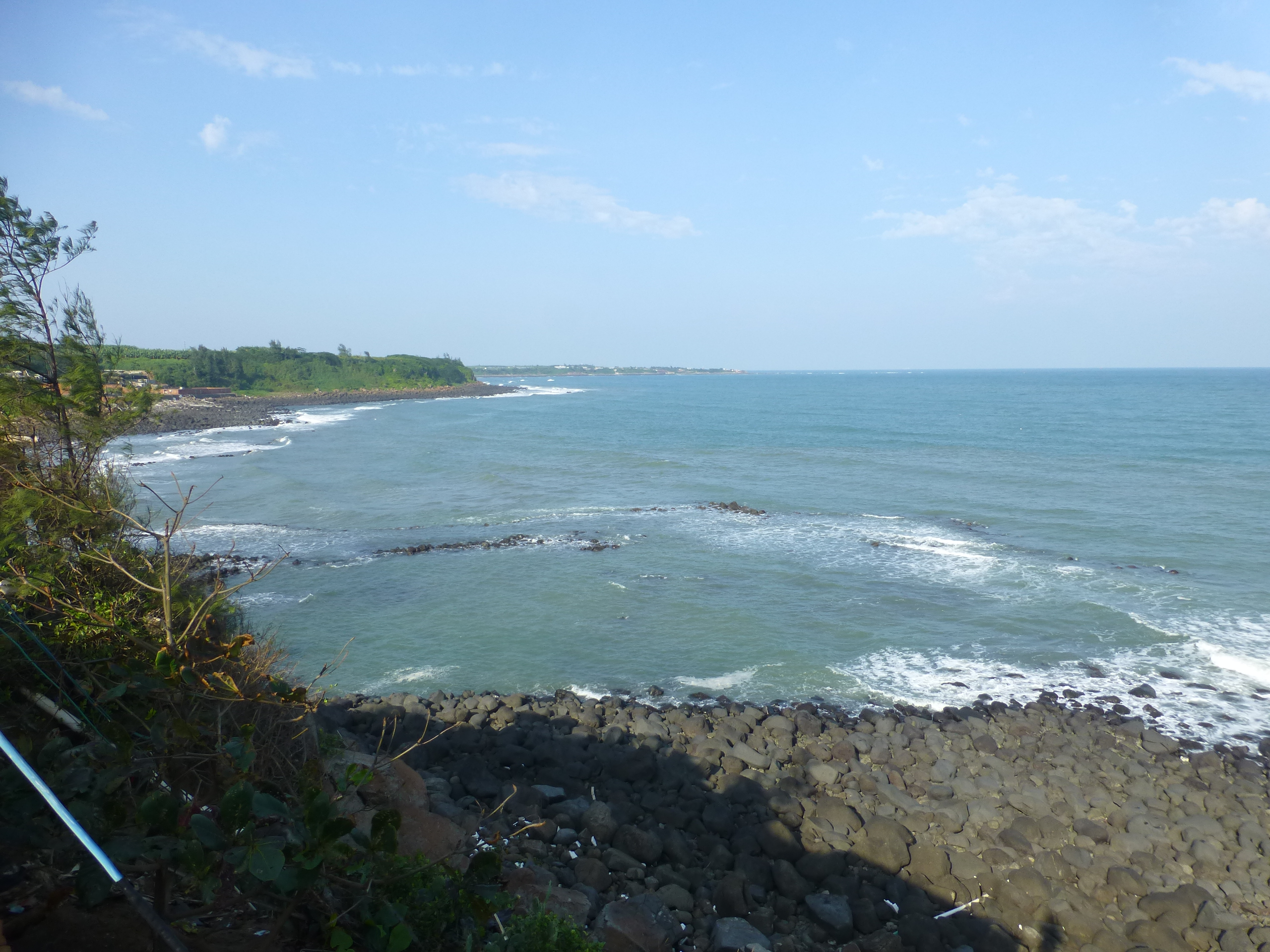
The Nayan Bay on Naozhou Island

Naozhou Island (French: Île Nau-Chau; Chinese: 硇洲岛; pinyin: Náozhōu Dǎo) (Nao Chow) is an island in the South China Sea. Administratively, the island is organized as Naozhou Town (硇洲镇) within Mazhang District of Zhanjiang City of Guangdong Province of China.

== Geography ==
Naozhou Island is a fairly small rocky island (10 km long by 6 km across). It is located near the southeastern corner of the larger Donghai Island, to which it is connected by a ferry line.

Naozhou is described as China's largest island of volcanic origin.

== History ==
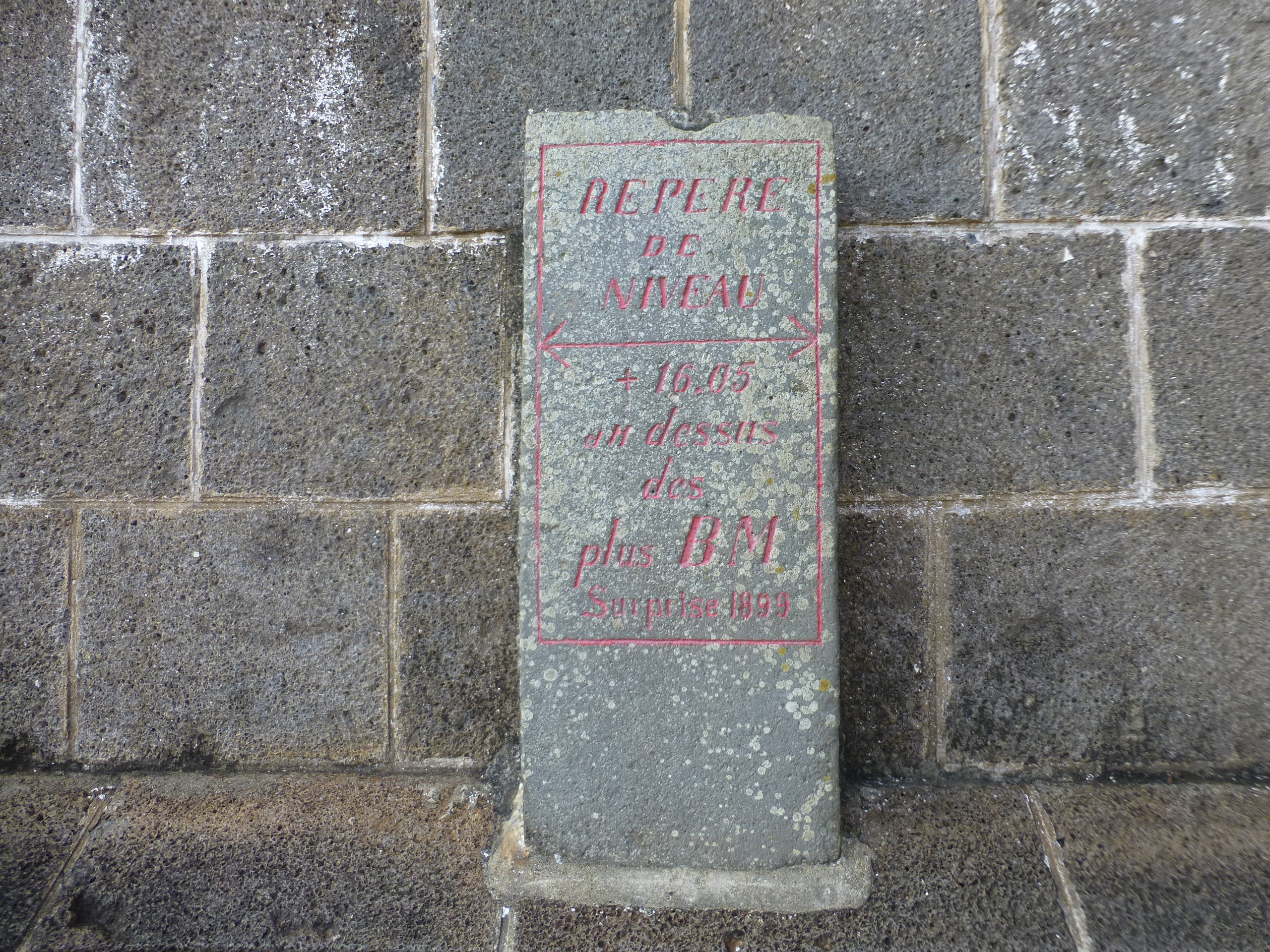
Elevation marker at the Naozhou Lighthouse

Naozhou's early recorded history is fairly sparse. During the Qing Dynasty, the island was included in Wuchuan County. According to a 1684 report, the island's population had been evacuated to the mainland some years earlier, as part of the Qing's campaign against the Taiwan-based Kingdom of Tungning. From 1704, Qing troops were stationed on the island as part of anti-pirate operations.

From 1899 to 1945, Naozhou Island was part of the French leased territory Guangzhouwan. French maps and documents referred to the island as Nao-Tchéou or Nau-Chau. The French had a lighthouse constructed near the island's highest point. The Naozhou Lighthouse (Phare de Nao-Tchéou, 硇洲灯塔) still exists; it is included on the List of Major National Historical and Cultural Sites.
