= G1503 Shanghai Ring Expressway =

Circular expressway in Shanghai, China

Shanghai Ring Expressway
- 上海绕城高速公路

Route information
- Length: 209.22 km (130.00 mi)

Major junctions
- Orbital around Shanghai
- Shanghai S20 / Yixian Elevated Road in Baoshan District; Shanghai S20 / Wuzhou Avenue in Pudong New Area; G40 in Pudong New Area; Shanghai S1 in Pudong New Area; Shanghai S2 in Pudong New Area; G15 in Jinshan District; G60 / G92 in Songjiang District; G50 in Qingpu District; G2 / G42 in Kunshan, Suzhou, Jiangsu; G15 in Jiading District; Shanghai S5 in Jiading District

Location
- Country: China

Highway system
- National Trunk Highway System; Primary; Auxiliary; National Highways; Transport in China
← G1501	→ G1504

The Shanghai Ring Expressway (Chinese: 上海绕城高速公路; pinyin: Shànghǎi Ràochéng Gāosù Gōnglù), designated G1503, formerly designated as A30 and G1501, and also known as the Shanghai Suburb Ring Expressway (Chinese: 上海郊环高速公路; pinyin: Shànghǎi Jiāohuán Gāosù Gōnglù), is a 209.22-kilometre-long ring expressway (130.00 mi) that encircles Shanghai, a direct-controlled municipality in the People's Republic of China. It is entirely in Shanghai, except for a small section in the nearby province of Jiangsu at its northwest end.

It forms the final ring in a series of four orbital roads around the city of Shanghai, with the others being the Inner Ring Road, Middle Ring Road, and the S20 Outer Ring Expressway. Part of G1503 Shanghai Ring Expressway in northern Pudong New Area is concurrent with the third ring, the S20 Outer Ring Expressway, due to the nature of the coastline of Shanghai with the East China Sea.

== Route ==
The kilometre zero of the Shanghai Ring Expressway is located at an interchange with S20 Outer Ring Expressway and Yixian Elevated Road in Baoshan District, and increase in a clockwise fashion. Immediately to the east of the interchange, the expressway descends into the Outer Ring Tunnel, so named because this section is concurrent with S20 Outer Ring Expressway. As the tunnel ends in Pudong New Area, it becomes an elevated highway for a short portion, curving southeast and then south, reaching the Wuzhou Avenue Interchange. Here, the concurrency with S20 Outer Ring Expressway ends, with the Outer Ring Expressway continuing to the south, Wuzhou Avenue to the west, while the Shanghai Ring Expressway continues east.

The expressway curves to the southeast, meeting the G40 Shanghai–Xi'an Expressway at its eastern terminus. The expressway continues southward, interchanging with S1 Yingbin Expressway, S32 Shanghai–Jiaxing–Huzhou Expressway, and S2 Shanghai–Luchaogang Expressway as it traverses Pudong New Area before curving west and entering Fengxian District. Its east section, from Longdong Avenue to former Nanhui District border, was named as Yuandong Avenue before the expressway is finished and became a ring in 2008.

The expressway travels west along the southern suburbs of Shanghai, passing through Fengxian District, where it interchanges with S4 Shanghai–Jinshan Expressway and Jinshan District. At an interchange with S19 Xinnong–Jinshanwei Expressway to the south and S36 Tinglin–Fengjing Expressway to the west, the expressway continues north, passing through Songjiang District, where it intersects with the concurrent G60 Shanghai–Kunming Expressway and G92 Hangzhou Bay Ring Expressway, and Qingpu District, where it interchanges with the G50 Shanghai–Chongqing Expressway. It then leaves the direct-controlled municipality of Shanghai for a short portion, entering the city of Kunshan in Jiangsu province, where it curves to the northeast and intersects with the concurrent G2 Beijing–Shanghai Expressway and G42 Shanghai–Chengdu Expressway at the Anting Interchange.

The expressway turns east, back into the Jiading District of Shanghai, where it intersects with the G15 Shenyang–Haikou Expressway and the S5 Shanghai–Jiading Expressway. Re-entering Baoshan District, the expressway becomes an elevated road, travelling above Fujin Road. At Tongji Road, the expressway curves to the south, paralleling the elevated Line 3 of the Shanghai Metro. This section is also known as Tongji Elevated Road, due to the fact that it runs above Tongji Road. At the southern end of Tongji Elevated Road, the Shanghai Ring Expressway returns to its kilometre zero marker.

The expressway is tolled from just before the interchange with G40 Shanghai–Xi'an Expressway in Pudong New Area, clockwise to just after an exit with Shanghai S127 (Wenchuan Highway), in Baoshan District.

== Exit list ==
Location	km	mi	Exit	Name	Destinations	Notes
G1503 (Shanghai Ring Expressway) / Shanghai S20 (Outer Ring Expressway)
Baoshan District, Shanghai	0	0		Shanghai S20 – Hongqiao Hub		Northern terminus of S20 concurrency; westbound exit only, eastbound entrance only
Baoshan District, Shanghai			97A	Outer Ring & Tongji Road	Tongji Road; Wusong Bridge	Uses S20 exit numbering; westbound exit only, eastbound entrance only
Pudong New Area, Shanghai			4	Jiangdong Road		Eastbound exit only
Pudong New Area, Shanghai	Service Area					
Pudong New Area, Shanghai			6	Linghai Road		Single-point urban interchange
Pudong New Area, Shanghai			8	North Zhangyang Road		
Pudong New Area, Shanghai			9	North Yanggao Road		Westbound exit and eastbound entrance only
Pudong New Area, Shanghai			13	Hangjin Road; Waigaoqiao Free Trade Zone Freight Entrance		
Pudong New Area, Shanghai			15	Zhouhai Road		
Pudong New Area, Shanghai			18	Outer Ring & Shanghai Ring Interchange (Chinese: 外环绕城)	Shanghai S20 – Huaxia Elevated Road, Pudong International Airport; Wuzhou Avenue (Xiangyin Road Tunnel)	Southern terminus of S20 concurrency
G1503 (Shanghai Ring Expressway)
Pudong New Area, Shanghai				Longyue Road		Unopened westbound exit and eastbound entrance only
Pudong New Area, Shanghai	Gaodong Toll Booth – all vehicles must stop					
Pudong New Area, Shanghai			21	Gaodong Interchange	G40 – Nantong, Qidong, Chongming Island	
Pudong New Area, Shanghai			25	Jinhai Road		
Pudong New Area, Shanghai			29	Longdong Avenue		
Pudong New Area, Shanghai	Heqing Service Area					
Pudong New Area, Shanghai			33	East Huaxia Road		
Pudong New Area, Shanghai			36	Shanghai Ring & Yingbin Expressway Interchange	Shanghai S1 – Shanghai City Center, Pudong International Airport	
Pudong New Area, Shanghai			38	Airport Avenue		To airport cargo and employee areas
Pudong New Area, Shanghai			42	Wenju Road		
Pudong New Area, Shanghai			46	Shen-Jia-Hu & Shanghai Ring Interchange(E)	Shanghai S32 – Jiaxing, Pudong International Airport	Southbound exit numbered 46A; northbound exit numbered 46B
Pudong New Area, Shanghai			52A	Gongji Road – Huinan		Southbound exit and northbound entrance only
Pudong New Area, Shanghai			53B	Shanghai S122 (Hunan Highway)		Northbound exit and southbound entrance only
Pudong New Area, Shanghai			59	Shanghai S324 (Dongda Highway)		
Pudong New Area, Shanghai			65	Dating Interchange	Shanghai S2 – Shanghai City Center, Donghai Bridge	
Fengxian District, Shanghai			70	Xinsiping Road		
Fengxian District, Shanghai			74	Wahong Highway – Hongmiao		
Fengxian District, Shanghai			82	Fengcheng	Shanghai S325 (Nanfeng Highway)	
Fengxian District, Shanghai			85	Shanghai S227 (Linhai Highway)		
Fengxian District, Shanghai			90	Shanghai S123 (Puxing Highway)		
Fengxian District, Shanghai	Guangming Service Area (eastbound only)					
Fengxian District, Shanghai			94	Shanghai S4 – Shanghai City Center, Ningbo		
Fengxian District, Shanghai			100	Puwei Highway		
Fengxian District, Shanghai	Zhuanghang Service Area (westbound only)					
Jinshan District, Shanghai			108	G15 / Shanghai S209 (Tingwei Highway) – Nantong, Ningbo, Tinglin		
Jinshan District, Shanghai			121	Xinnong Interchange	Shanghai S19 / Shanghai S36 – Jinshanwei, Zhujing	
Jinshan District, Shanghai			122	Xinnong	G320 (Tingfeng Highway)	
Songjiang District, Shanghai			128	Maogang	Shanghai S324 (Yexin Highway)	
Songjiang District, Shanghai			132	Litahui	Shanghai S32 / X345 (Minta Highway) – Jiaxing, Litahui, Pudong International Airport	
Songjiang District, Shanghai			136	Dagang Interchange	G60 / G92 – Hangzhou, Shanghai City Center, Dagang	
Songjiang District, Shanghai	Xiaokunshan Service Area					
Songjiang District, Shanghai			144	Tianma	Shenzhuan Highway	
Qingpu District, Shanghai			151	Shanghai Ring Huqingping	G50 – Huzhou, Shanghai City Center, Qingpu City Center	
Qingpu District, Shanghai			157	Chonggu	Shanghai S125 (Beiqing Highway)	
Qingpu District, Shanghai			160	Shanghai S26 – Suzhou		
Qingpu District, Shanghai			163	Baihe	Waiqingsong Highway; Baishi Highway; Jihe Highway	
Kunshan, Jiangsu			168	Anting Interchange	G2 / G42 – Anting, Hongqiao Hub	
Jiading District, Shanghai			172	Shanghai S322 (Bao'an Highway)		
Jiading District, Shanghai			176	Shanghai S224 (North Jiasong Road) – Shanghai International Circuit		
Jiading District, Shanghai			180	Jiaxi Interchange	G15 – Nantong, Ningbo, Taicang	
Jiading District, Shanghai			181	Yongsheng Road		Westbound entrance and eastbound exit and entrance only
Jiading District, Shanghai			184	Jiading Nanmen Interchange	Shanghai S5 – Nanxiang, Jiading City Center, Shanghai City Center	
Jiading District, Shanghai			187	Liuxiang Highway		
Baoshan District, Shanghai			193	Shanghai S126 (Hutai Highway)		
Baoshan District, Shanghai			199	Shanghai S127 (Wenchuan Highway) – Shanghai City Center		Eastbound exit and westbound entrance only
Baoshan District, Shanghai	Yuepu Service Area (eastbound only)					
Baoshan District, Shanghai	Yuepu Toll Booth – all vehicles must stop					
Baoshan District, Shanghai			204A	Tongji Road – Baosteel, Baoyang Road Port, Wusong Passenger Center		Eastbound exit and westbound entrance only
Baoshan District, Shanghai			204	Fujin Road – Baosteel		Northbound exit and southbound entrance only
Baoshan District, Shanghai			206	Baoyang Road – Baoshan City Center, Wusongkou International Cruise Terminal		Northbound exit and southbound entrance only
Baoshan District, Shanghai			208	Shuichan Road		Northbound exit and southbound entrance only
G1503 (Shanghai Ring Expressway) / Shanghai S20 (Outer Ring Expressway) continues above (orbital)
Closed/former; Concurrency terminus; HOV only; Incomplete access; Tolled; Route transition; Unopened

== See also ==
- Expressways of Shanghai
