= Houtouwan =

Abandoned fishing village in China

- Ghost town
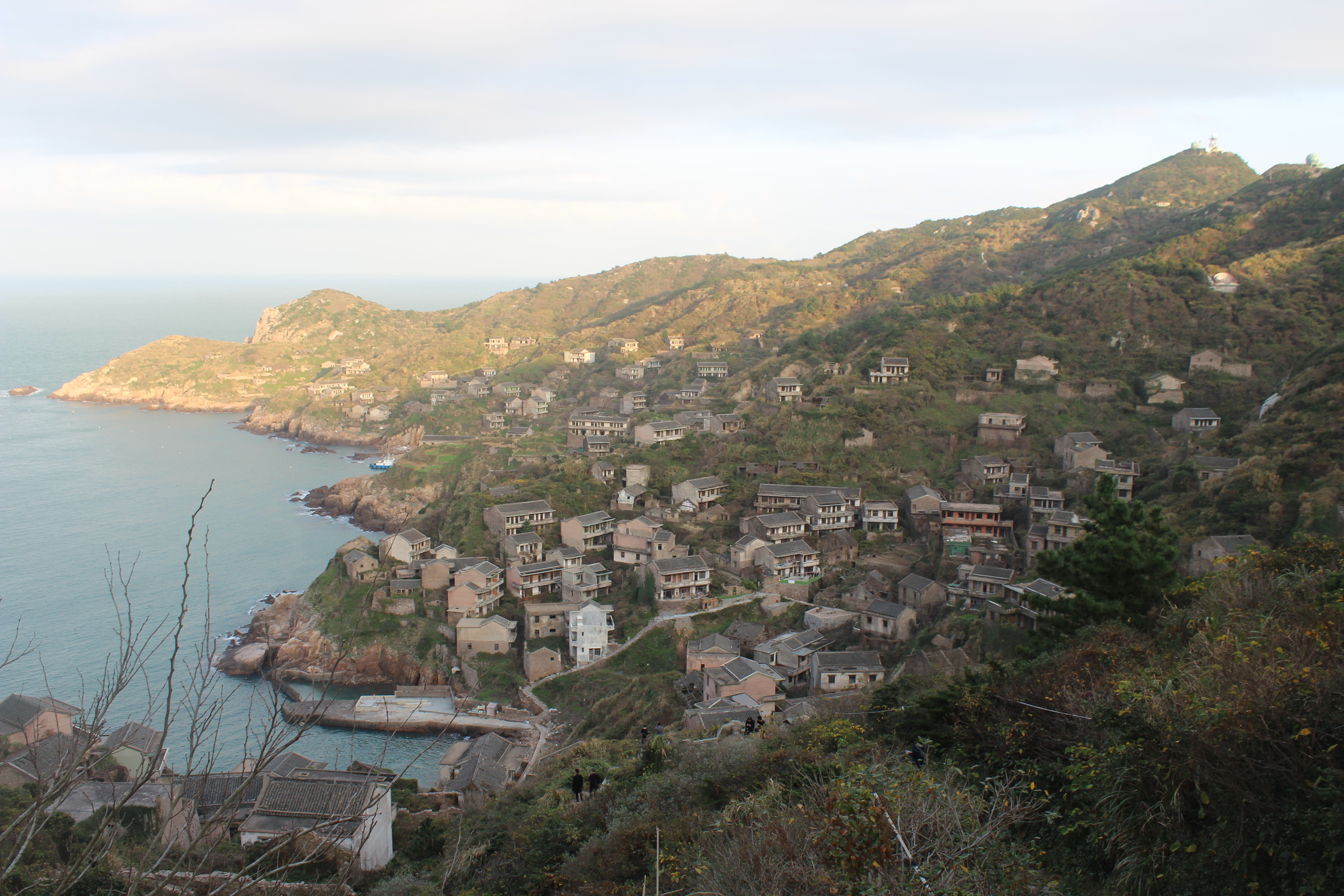
- Houtouwan at dusk

- Location within China
- Coordinates: 30.727°N 122.82°E
- Country: China
- Region: East China
- Time zone: UTC−8 (Pacific)
  - Summer (DST): UTC+08:00 (CST)

Houtouwan (Chinese: 后头湾; pinyin: Hòutóuwān) is an abandoned fishing village and tourist attraction on the northern side of Shengshan Island (Chinese: 嵊山岛; pinyin: Shèngshān dǎo), one of the Shengsi Islands, a chain of nearly 400 islands located 64 kilometres (40 mi) east of Shanghai, China.

== History ==
The village was established in the 1950s and was once home to more than 2,000 fishermen and 500 homes. By the 1990s, the population began to rapidly decline due to lack of adequate connection to the mainland, education, and job opportunities. The fishing community could not keep up with the growing competition in Shanghai, causing the fish dependent community to migrate to the mainland for better prospects. Only a handful of people remained in the village by 1994, and by 2002, the village had been depopulated, although in 2015 a few people were known to reside there.

Since its abandonment, the once-bustling village has been overtaken by greenery, and it has become a "popular tourist attraction" which has resulted in some former residents returning each day to work at the village.
