= Yangshan Port =

Coordinates: 30°37′N 122°04′E

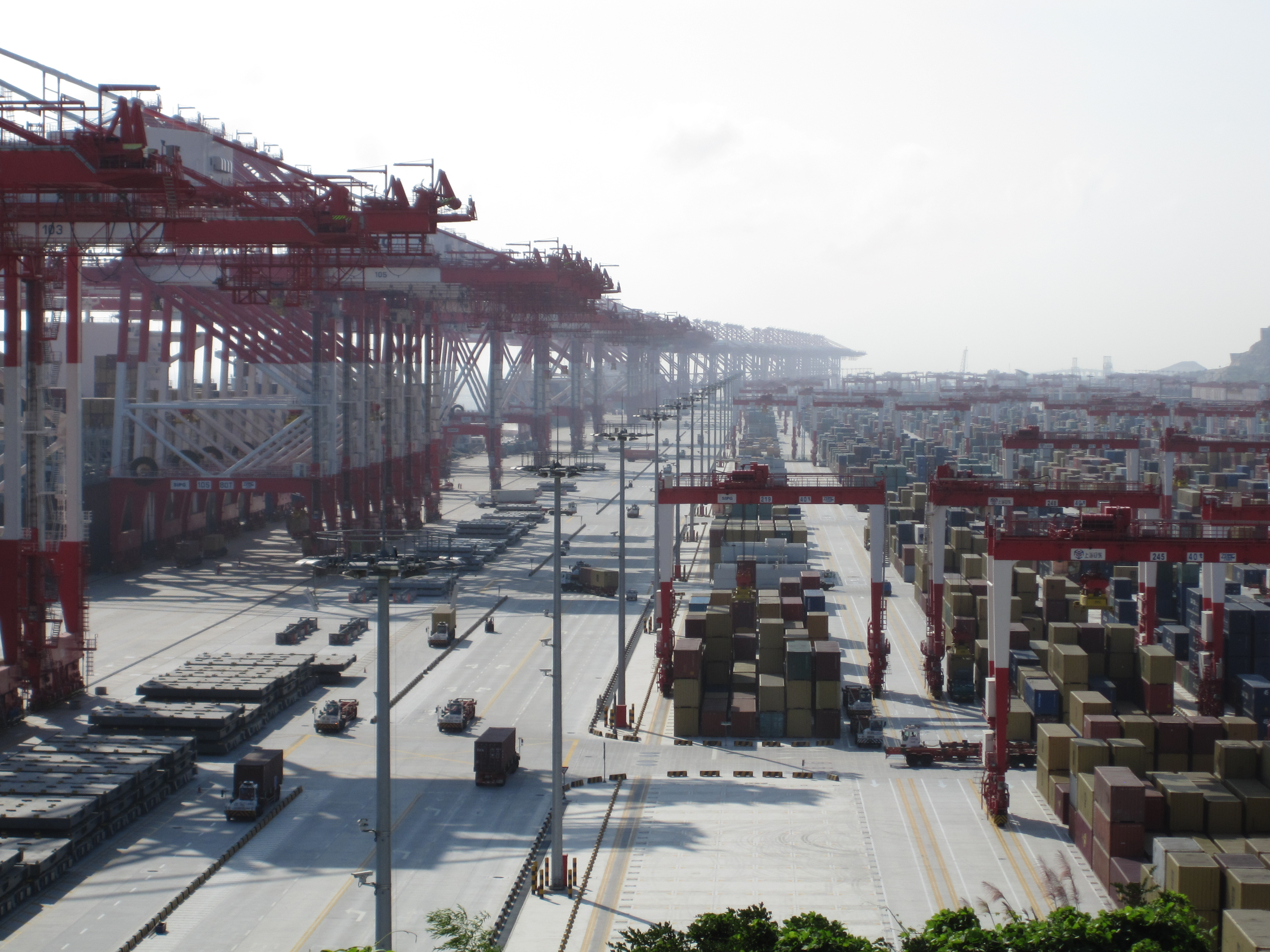
- Yangshan Port
- Interactive map of Yangshan Port

Location
- Country: China
- Location: Shengsi County, Zhejiang Province
- Coordinates: 30°37'46.0"N 122°03'27.9"E

Details
- Opened: 2005
- Operated by: Shanghai International Port Group
- Type of Harbor: Deep-water seaport

Statistics
- Annual container volume: > 50 million TEU (2025)

Yangshan Port (Chinese: 洋山港; pinyin: Yángshān Gǎng; Wugniu: ^{2}Yan-^{1}sae ^{3}Kaon), formally the Yangshan Deep-Water Port (Chinese: 洋山深水港; pinyin: Yángshān Shēnshuǐ Gǎng; Wugniu: ^{2}Yan-^{1}sae ^{1}Shin-^{3}syu ^{3}Kaon), is an offshore deep-water port for containerization in Hangzhou Bay south of Shanghai, China, built on land reclamation joining the Lesser Yangshan Island with numerous other nearby islands of the northwestern Zhoushan archipelago. It is connected to Shanghai's Pudong New Area on the mainland by the 32.5 km-long (20.2 mi) Donghai Bridge, forming part of the Port of Shanghai, while the other islands of Yangshan archipelago (including the Greater Yangshan Island, where the civilian population of the archipelago live) are administered separately as part of Zhejiang's Shengsi County.

Yangshan Port is part of China's Maritime Silk Road, built to allow the Port of Shanghai to grow despite shallow waters near the shore. Prior to its construction, the Port of Shanghai was predominantly based around the mouth of the Huangpu River, which is too shallow to handle large container ships, forcing the port to often perform mid-stream operations within the Yangtze estuary, which often had to wait for the high tide hours, severely restricting the port's capacity. The construction of Yangshan Port allows berths with depths of up to 15 m (49 ft) to be built, and can handle today's largest container ships. In mid-2011, port officials said the port was on track to move 12.3 million twenty-foot equivalent units (TEUs) during the year, up from 10.1 million TEUs in 2010, overtaking Port of Singapore to become the world's busiest container port. In 2015, the port handled 36.54 million TEUs, and by 2025, its throughput had exceeded 50 million TEUs.

== Construction phases ==
In 2000 and 2001, the decision was made to commence construction on the first of four phases. The first two phases have nine berths in total along a 3 km (1.9 mi) quayside. The first phase, which opened in 2004, can accommodate 2.2 million containers annually and includes 10 quay cranes. The second phase was opened in December 2006, and comprises 72 hectares (180 acres) with 15 quay cranes. The third phase, opened in stages, was completed in 2010 with seven berths. The fourth phase, which began trial operation on December 10, 2017, will add 4 million Twenty-foot equivalent units (TEUs) to the port's annual capacity.

The total cost of building the port may reach US$12 billion over 20 years. When complete, the port will have 30 berths capable of handling 15 million TEUs annually.

== Highway access ==
The Yangshan Port is connected to the mainland via the 32.5 km (20.2 mi) Donghai Bridge, opened on 1 December 2005 as the world's longest sea bridge. The six-lane highway bridge took 6,000 workers 2 1/2 years to construct.

== Rail access ==
There is no direct railway connection to the Yangshan Port. The port is served by Luchaogang railway station on the Pudong Railway, which was opened in 2005 near the mainland end of the Donghai Bridge.

== Urbanisation impacts ==
Following the construction of the port, the Shanghai government viewed this as an opportunity to develop a heavy equipment manufacturing zone and a new town nearby.

== See also ==
- Donghai Bridge Wind Farm
