= Shengsi County =

Shengsi 嵊泗县
- County
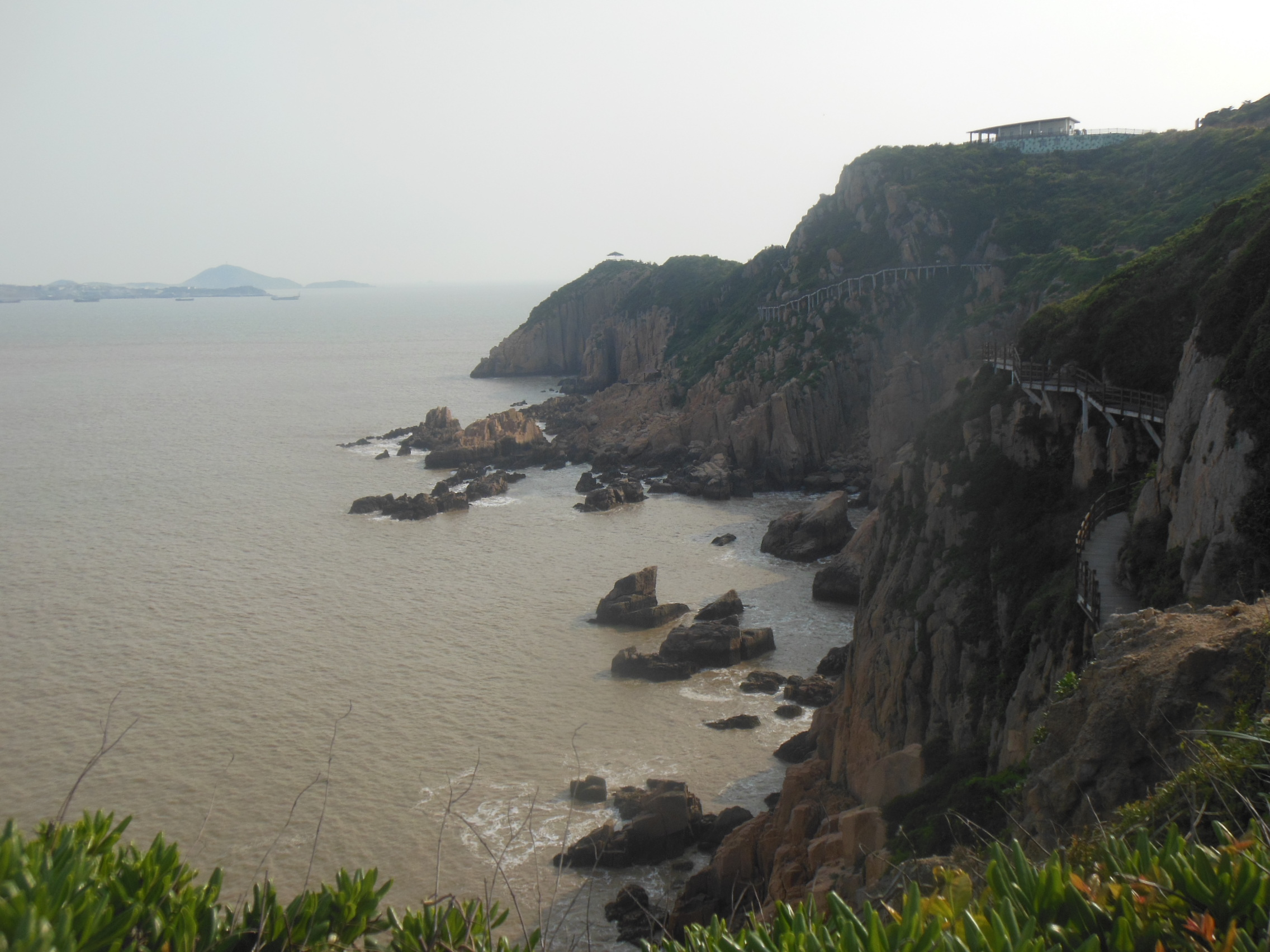

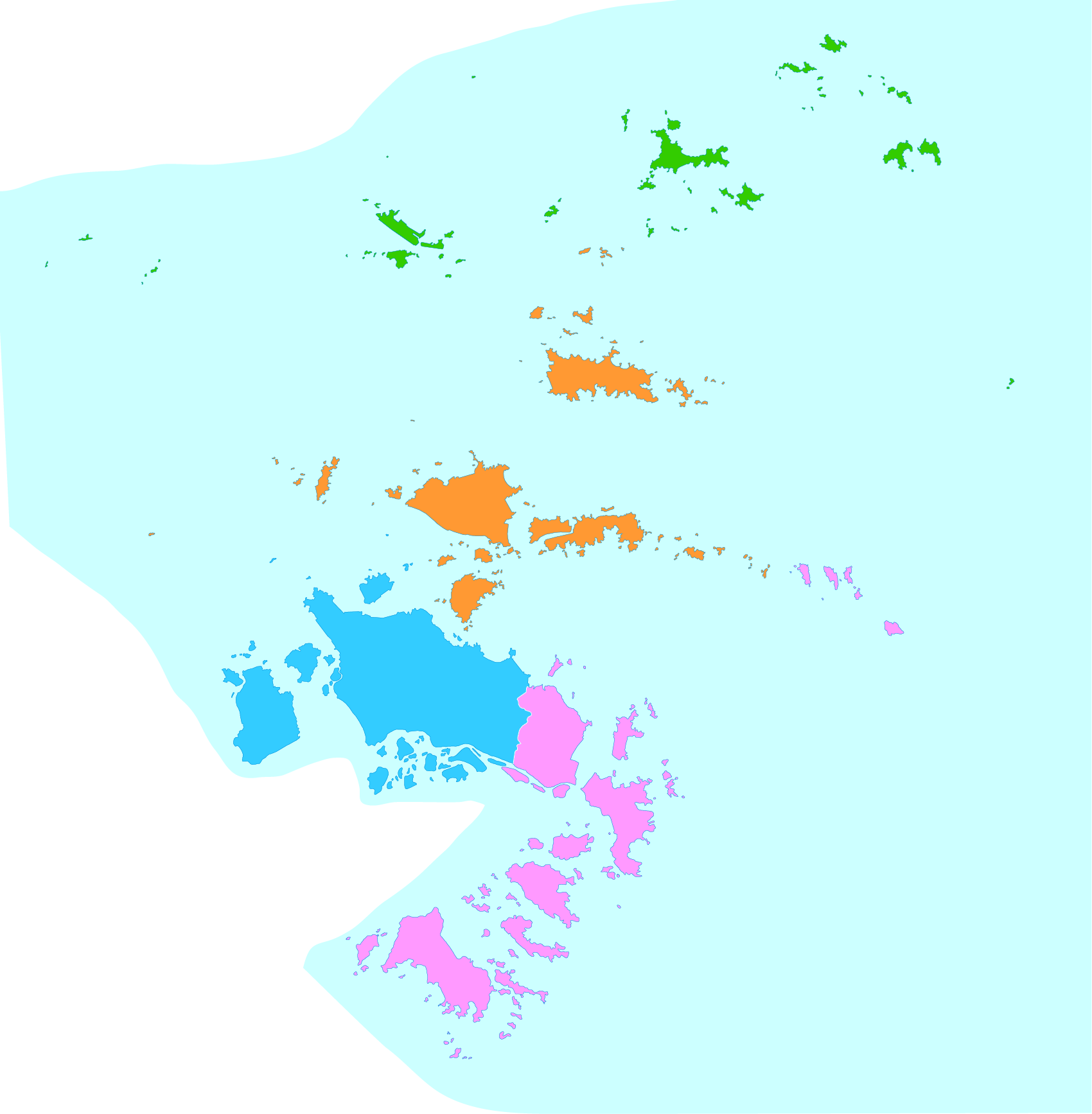
- Shengsi County is in green here on the map.

- Location in Zhejiang
- Coordinates: 30°43′26″N 122°27′16″E
- Country: People's Republic of China
- Province: Zhejiang
- Prefecture-level city: Zhoushan

Area
  - Land: 86 km^{2} (33 sq mi)
  - Water: 8,738 km^{2} (3,374 sq mi)

Population (2018)
  - Total: 75,221
- Time zone: UTC+8 (China Standard)
- Postal code: 202450
- Website: www.shengsi.gov.cn

Shengsi
- Chinese: 嵊泗
- Postal: Shengsze
Transcriptions
Standard Mandarin
- Hanyu Pinyin: Shèngsì
- Wade–Giles: Sheng^{4}-szu^{4}

Shengsi County is a county in the northeast of Zhejiang province in China consisting of an archipelago of islands located to the east of Hangzhou Bay. It is under the administration of Zhoushan City and is the easternmost county-level division in the province. The islands of Greater and Lesser Yangshan are connected with Shanghai's Pudong New Area by the Donghai Bridge and their port forms part of the Port of Shanghai. They are, however, not counted among the islands of Shanghai.

The county consists of 630 islands and islets, of which 13 have more than 100 inhabitants.

Near the end of the Chinese Civil War, Shengsi County was the capital of Jiangsu Province prior to its fall in 1950. The islands have been under communist administration since the Battle of Yijiangshan Islands in 1955.

== Administrative divisions ==
Towns:

- Caiyuan (菜园镇), Shengshan (嵊山镇), Yangshan (洋山镇)

Townships:

- Wulong Township (五龙乡), Huanglong Township (黄龙乡), Gouqi Township (枸杞乡), Huadao Township (花鸟乡)

== Climate ==
Climate data for Shengsi, elevation 80 m (260 ft), (1991–2020 normals, extremes 1981–present)
Month	Jan	Feb	Mar	Apr	May	Jun	Jul	Aug	Sep	Oct	Nov	Dec	Year
Record high °C (°F)	22.2 (72.0)	25.9 (78.6)	27.0 (80.6)	29.8 (85.6)	30.3 (86.5)	34.3 (93.7)	36.3 (97.3)	37.4 (99.3)	35.1 (95.2)	32.4 (90.3)	26.1 (79.0)	21.9 (71.4)	37.4 (99.3)
Mean daily maximum °C (°F)	8.5 (47.3)	9.6 (49.3)	12.7 (54.9)	17.4 (63.3)	21.9 (71.4)	25.2 (77.4)	29.6 (85.3)	29.9 (85.8)	26.7 (80.1)	22.3 (72.1)	17.5 (63.5)	11.5 (52.7)	19.4 (66.9)
Daily mean °C (°F)	6.1 (43.0)	6.8 (44.2)	9.7 (49.5)	14.1 (57.4)	18.9 (66.0)	22.5 (72.5)	26.6 (79.9)	27.1 (80.8)	24.3 (75.7)	20.0 (68.0)	15.1 (59.2)	9.1 (48.4)	16.7 (62.1)
Mean daily minimum °C (°F)	4.1 (39.4)	4.7 (40.5)	7.4 (45.3)	11.7 (53.1)	16.6 (61.9)	20.6 (69.1)	24.5 (76.1)	25.1 (77.2)	22.5 (72.5)	18.2 (64.8)	13.1 (55.6)	7.0 (44.6)	14.6 (58.3)
Record low °C (°F)	−6.6 (20.1)	−3.0 (26.6)	−2.5 (27.5)	3.7 (38.7)	8.1 (46.6)	12.7 (54.9)	17.0 (62.6)	18.9 (66.0)	15.0 (59.0)	8.1 (46.6)	0.8 (33.4)	−5.7 (21.7)	−6.6 (20.1)
Average precipitation mm (inches)	65.3 (2.57)	67.4 (2.65)	103.3 (4.07)	90.3 (3.56)	95.1 (3.74)	202.2 (7.96)	106.5 (4.19)	128.4 (5.06)	86.5 (3.41)	84.5 (3.33)	62.9 (2.48)	62.5 (2.46)	1,154.9 (45.48)
Average precipitation days (≥ 0.1 mm)	10.9	10.2	13.5	12.4	12.0	14.9	8.6	9.5	9.5	7.6	9.7	9.1	127.9
Average snowy days	2.4	2.0	0.6	0.1	0	0	0	0	0	0	0	0.8	5.9
Average relative humidity (%)	74	76	78	79	82	88	86	85	80	72	72	71	79
Mean monthly sunshine hours	115.8	118.3	144.9	164.4	176.2	130.9	231.9	238.9	189.5	179.8	135.8	133.4	1,959.8
Percentage possible sunshine	36	38	39	42	42	31	54	59	52	51	43	42	44
Source: China Meteorological Administration all-time extreme temperatureNOAA

Climate data for Xiaoyangshan Island, elevation 54 m (177 ft), (1991–2020 normals)
Month	Jan	Feb	Mar	Apr	May	Jun	Jul	Aug	Sep	Oct	Nov	Dec	Year
Mean daily maximum °C (°F)	8.0 (46.4)	9.4 (48.9)	13.2 (55.8)	17.8 (64.0)	22.8 (73.0)	25.6 (78.1)	30.6 (87.1)	31.0 (87.8)	27.0 (80.6)	22.6 (72.7)	17.5 (63.5)	11.1 (52.0)	19.7 (67.5)
Daily mean °C (°F)	5.9 (42.6)	6.9 (44.4)	10.2 (50.4)	14.7 (58.5)	19.8 (67.6)	23.1 (73.6)	27.6 (81.7)	28.2 (82.8)	24.7 (76.5)	20.5 (68.9)	15.3 (59.5)	8.8 (47.8)	17.1 (62.9)
Mean daily minimum °C (°F)	4.2 (39.6)	4.9 (40.8)	8.0 (46.4)	12.4 (54.3)	17.6 (63.7)	21.3 (70.3)	25.5 (77.9)	26.2 (79.2)	23.0 (73.4)	18.9 (66.0)	13.6 (56.5)	7.0 (44.6)	15.2 (59.4)
Average precipitation mm (inches)	64.1 (2.52)	77.2 (3.04)	104.1 (4.10)	90.8 (3.57)	95.5 (3.76)	251.0 (9.88)	106.6 (4.20)	118.2 (4.65)	129.5 (5.10)	95.8 (3.77)	69.7 (2.74)	60.5 (2.38)	1,263 (49.71)
Average precipitation days (≥ 0.1 mm)	11.1	11.3	13.0	10.5	11.0	15.3	9.5	9.1	10.5	6.3	10.3	9.2	127.1
Average snowy days	2.1	1.5	0.3	0.1	0	0	0	0	0	0	0	1.0	5
Average relative humidity (%)	74	77	76	77	79	87	82	81	78	71	72	70	77
Mean monthly sunshine hours	114.4	110.7	152.7	174.4	183.3	122.5	230.6	247.2	174.8	172.0	131.7	141.4	1,955.7
Percentage possible sunshine	36	35	41	45	43	29	54	61	48	49	42	45	44
Source: China Meteorological Administration

== See also ==
- Shengsi Islands
