= Hangzhou Bay =

Inlet of the East China Sea

Coordinates: 30.2852°N 120.924°E

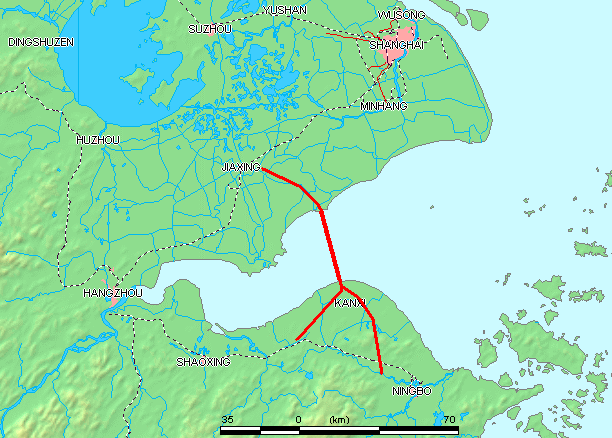
Hangzhou Bay extends from the East China Sea (right) to its namesake, the city of Hangzhou, where the Qiantang River flows in (left). The red line shows the first bridge crossing of the bay, Hangzhou Bay Bridge. Zhoushan Islands is the archipelago, off Ningbo, at the southeast edge of the Bay (lower right). Shanghai is north of the bay (upper right).

Hangzhou Bay (Note: Chinese: 杭州湾; pinyin: Hángzhōu Wān; Hangzhou Wu: han-tsei uae) is a funnel-shaped inlet of the East China Sea on the middle eastern coast of Mainland China, bordered by the province of Zhejiang to the west and south, and the municipality of Shanghai to the north. The bay extends westwards to its head at the city of Hangzhou, the provincial capital of Zhejiang, from which its name is derived. The east and southeast margin of Hangzhou Bay are marked by numerous islands off the shores of Ningbo, collectively called the Zhoushan Islands, which is an urbanized archipelago that forms the prefecture-level city of Zhoushan.

At Hangzhou, the Qiantang River flows into the bay, providing fresh water from the west, while seawater comes in from the east. Thus, Hangzhou Bay, especially its western end, is sometimes called the Qiantang River Estuary in scientific literature.

At less than 15 metres (49 ft) in depth, the Hangzhou Bay is relatively shallow. Consequently, the main port in the bay area is the Port of Ningbo-Zhoushan, the busiest port in the world by cargo tonnage, at the southeast end of the bay striding between Ningbo and Zhoushan. The busiest container port in the world, the offshore Yangshan Port administered by the Port of Shanghai, is built on reclaimed land joining several small islands in a northwestern group of the Zhoushan Islands, which is connected to the mainland via the 32.5 km-long (20.2 mi) Donghai Bridge.

== Qiantang River tidal bore ==
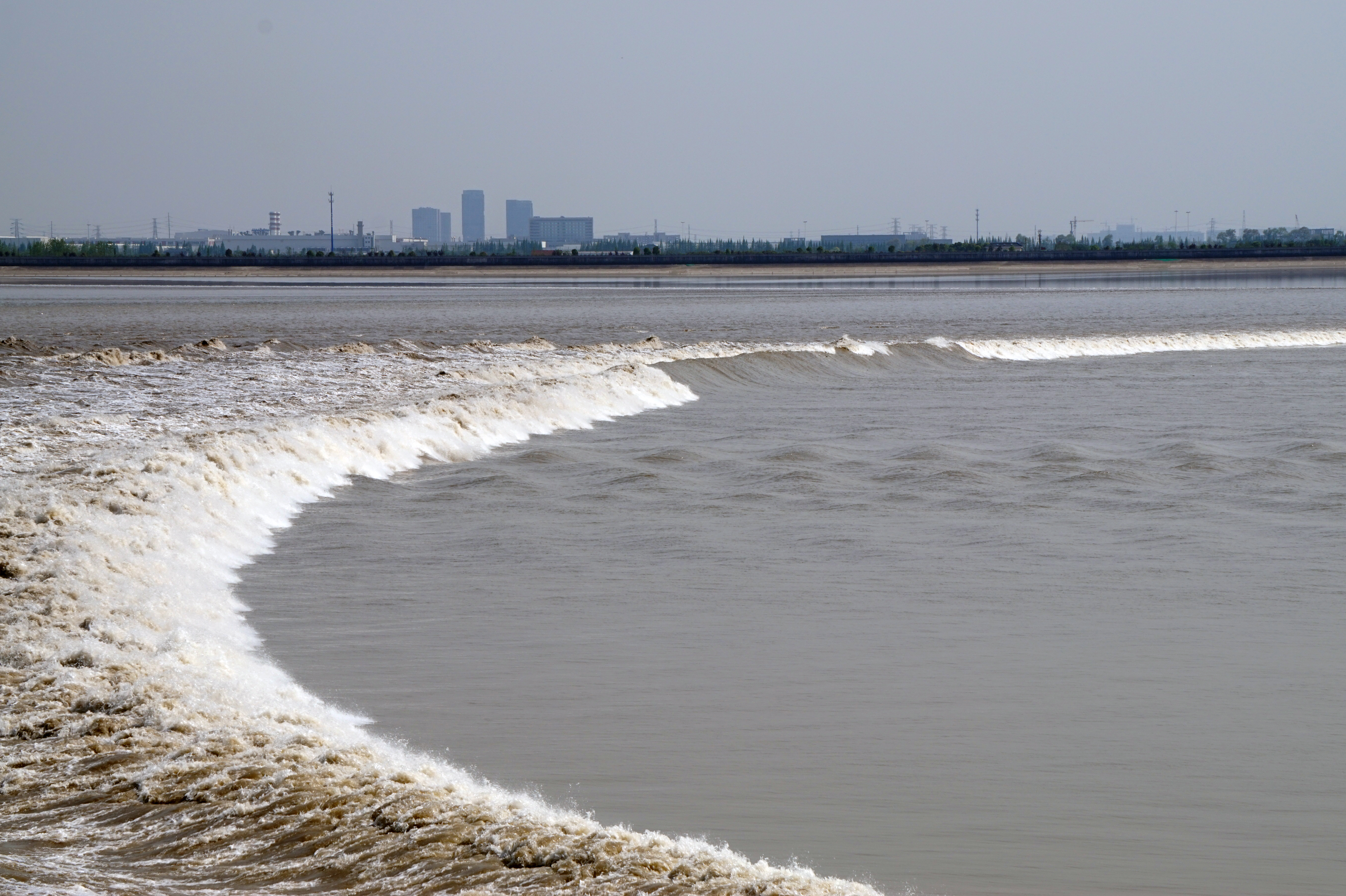
Yanguan tidal bore (2017)

The Bay is known for hosting the world's largest tidal bore, up to 9 meters (30 feet) high, and traveling up to 40 km (25 mi) per hour. Yanguan Town Tide-Viewing Park (盐官镇观潮胜地公园, Yánguān Zhèn Guāncháo Shèngdì Gōngyuán), on the north shore of Hangzhou Bay some 50 km east of the city of Hangzhou, is regarded as one of the best place to watch the Qiantang River Tidal Bore, especially on the 18th day of the eighth lunar month.

== Ecology ==
Hangzhou Bay is on the East Asian-Australasian Flyway, along which millions of birds travel during migration. The southern shore of Hangzhou Bay has wetlands with mudflats that are prime habitat for migrating waterbirds and shorebirds to stop and rest. Specific shorebird species that use Hangzhou Bay as a stopover site include Red-necked Stint, Siberian Sand Plover, Terek Sandpiper, Sharp-tailed Sandpiper, and Dunlin, with the first four using it more in spring, but Dunlin using it more in fall. The site is also known to be highly important for Whimbrel, which travel thousands of kilometers from their winter range in places like northern Australia and Indonesia to their summer range in Siberia.

In addition to its importance for migrating birds, Hangzhou Bay is also one of the most important habitats for waterbirds and shorebirds during winter. During the winter it supports an estimated 20,000 birds, with notably high proportions of the populations of Dunlin, Kentish Plover, Gray Plover, Pied Avocet, and Eurasian Curlew using the area. As a result of its importance for both wintering and migrating birds, Hangzhou Bay has been identified by scientists as one of three priority regions within Zhejiang for wetland conservation efforts.

== Conservation and regional context ==
The Hangzhou Bay National Wetland Park was established in 2017, and while this is a positive step, work remains to conserve this area. For example, research shows that some of the most important areas used by migrating Whimbrel are outside the park's boundary. Additionally shrimp and clam aquaculture are present in the bay and the invasive plant Smooth Cordgrass is damaging wetland habitat. In Hangzhou Bay, the cordgrass covers about 22% of wetlands. Where cordgrass occurs, it displaces native plants and converts the mudflats to dense vegetation that is unsuitable for most waterbirds. Through this, the spread of cordgrass has contributed to population declines in birds across the Yellow Sea; though not entirely due to cordgrass (see the destruction of the Saemangeum mudflats), it is estimated that the area of suitable sites for migratory shorebirds has decreased by 35.6% in the Yellow Sea, leading to an estimated 7.8% decline in shorebirds in the same area.

Given that shorebirds are in decline globally, there is much attention in the conservation community on securing greater protection for places like Hangzhou Bay along the Yellow Sea. Some progress has been made along other parts of the Yellow Sea; for example, in 2021 the Getbol, Korean Tidal Flats, which host numerous endangered migrating shorebirds, were declared a UNESCO World Heritage Site.

== Bay bridges ==
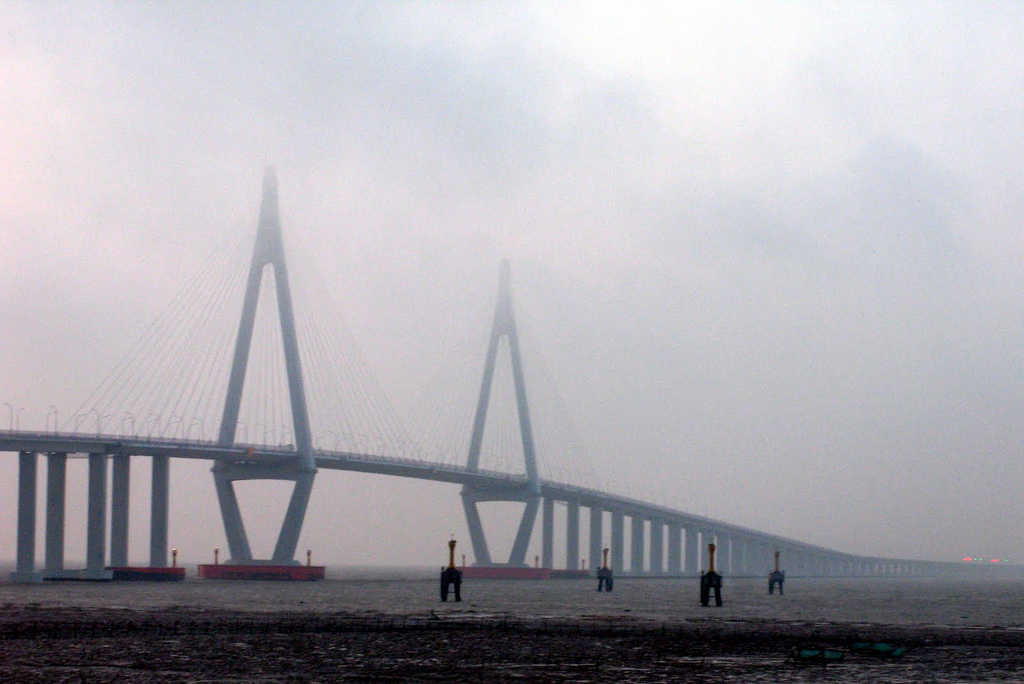
Hangzhou Bay Bridge: northern cable-stayed span

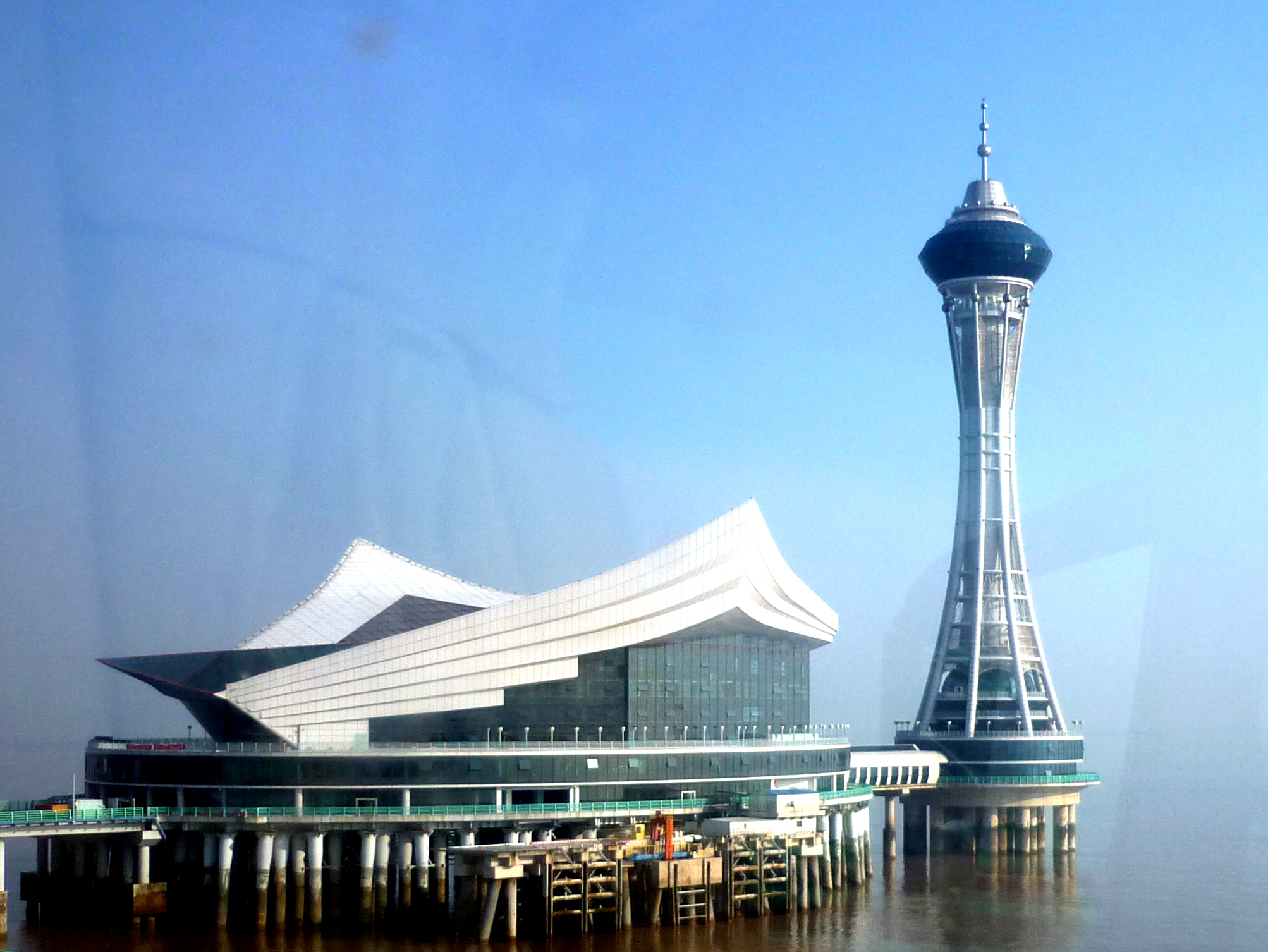
Service center with lookout tower at midpoint of Hangzhou Bay Bridge

The Bay was first spanned by the Hangzhou Bay Bridge, which was linked up on June 14, 2007, and opened on May 1, 2008. It is a long 35.7 km (22.2 mi) bridge carrying G15 expressway, three lanes each way, with two separate cable-stayed portions and a service center at the bridge midpoint. It runs across the mouth of Hangzhou Bay connecting the municipalities of Jiaxing and Ningbo in Zhejiang province. One of the longest bridges in the world, it cuts the trip between eastern Zhejiang and Shanghai from 400 to 80 kilometers (249 to 50 miles).

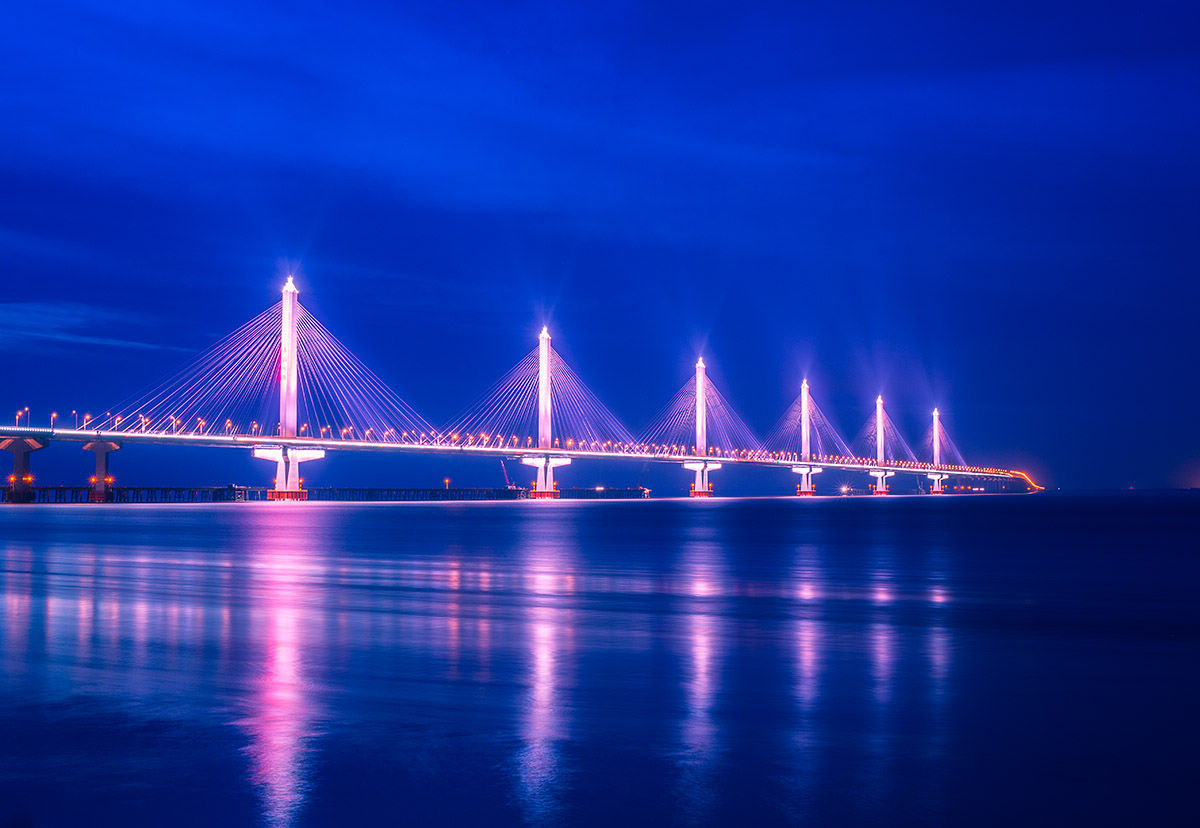
The Jiashao Bridge with six consecutive cable-stayed spans

The second bridge crossing of the Bay is the Jiashao Bridge, located west of the Hangzhou Bay Bridge, and completed in 2013. It stretches 10.14 km (6.30 mi) across the Qiantang River estuary and carries the G15W expressway, four lanes each way, over six consecutive cable-stayed spans supported by six tall pylons. The Jiashao Bridge connects Shaoxing on the south shore of the Bay to a point on the north shore of the Bay due south of Jiaxing and provides a more direct route for vehicle traffic between Shaoxing and Shanghai.

Another bridge is planned which will carry the Nantong–Ningbo high-speed railway.

== Hangzhou Great Bay Area ==
In 2018, the Zhejiang provincial government, following in Guangdong's footsteps, released ambitious plans for the Hangzhou Great Bay Area, aiming for a mega urban re-development schema that would double the economic output of the region by 2022 and develop a "world class" bay area in Zhejiang by 2035. The Great Bay Area, an economic and industrial belt centered around Hangzhou Bay, is home to about 40 million people and, as of 2017, accounts for 87 percent of the province's economic output. The challenge to Zhejiang's vision may be its interaction with Shanghai.

== See also ==
- Qiantang River
- Tidal bore
- Port of Ningbo-Zhoushan
- Yangtze River Delta
