= Donghai Island =

Island in Guangdong, People's Republic of China

Coordinates: 21°00′55″N 110°23′10″E

Locator map for Donghai and surrounding islands.

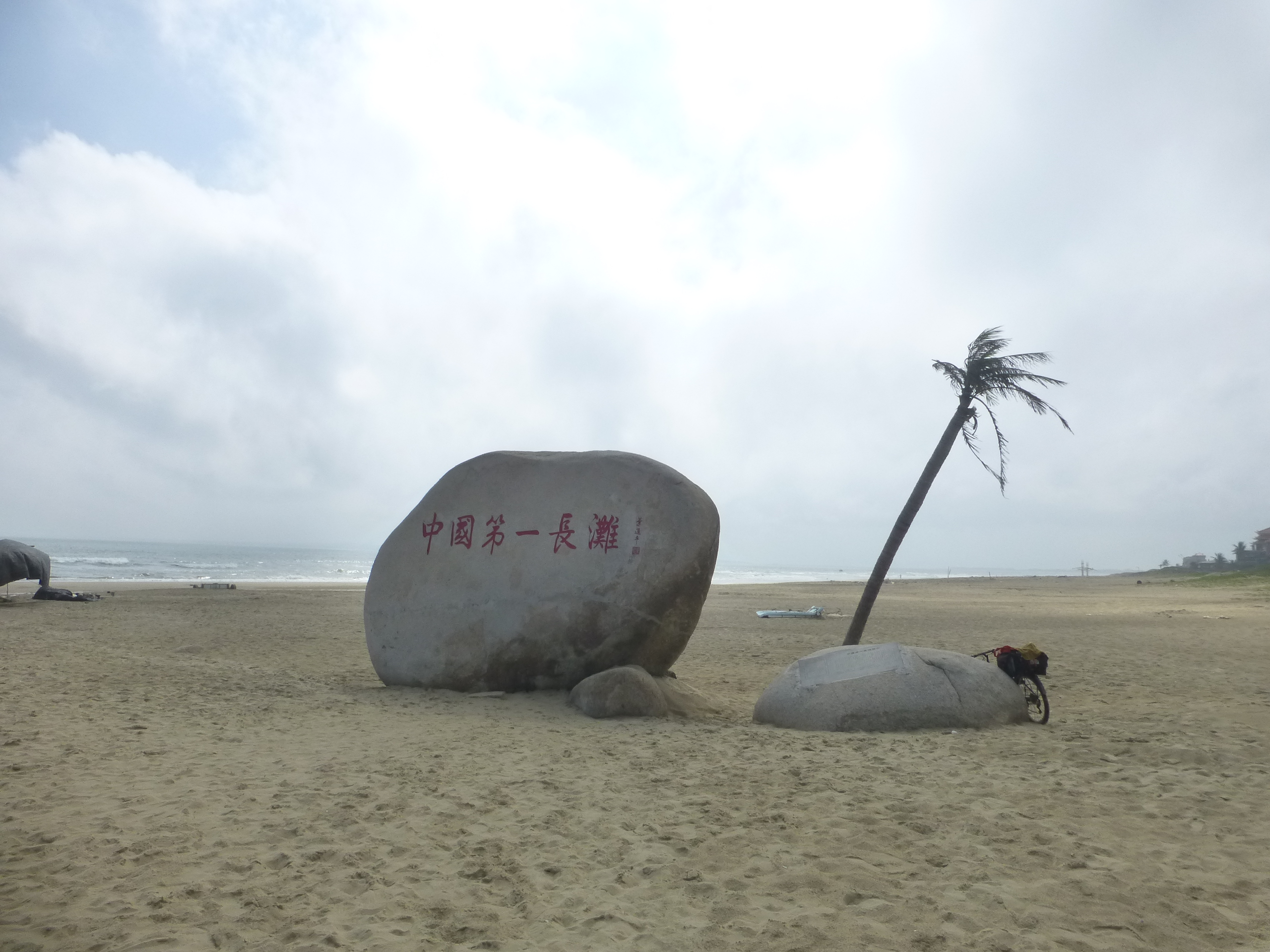
Donghai Island Beach. Writing on the rock translates to "China's longest beach".

Donghai Island (French: Île de Tan-Hai; simplified Chinese: 东海岛; traditional Chinese: 東海島; pinyin: Dōnghǎi Dǎo; Leizhou Min: Tahn-hái tóu; Jyutping: Dung^{1}hoi^{2} Dou^{2}) (Tunghai) is an island in the southeast part of the urban area of Zhanjiang, Guangdong, People's Republic of China. It has a coastline of 159.48 kilometres (99.10 mi), with a total area of 286 square kilometres (110 sq mi), making it the largest island in Guangdong and the fifth-largest island in China. In 2008, it had a population of around 160,000.

== See also ==
- Naozhou Island
- List of islands of the People's Republic of China
- Chinese semi-submersible ship Donghaidao
