= Donghai Bridge =

Donghai Bridge 东海大桥
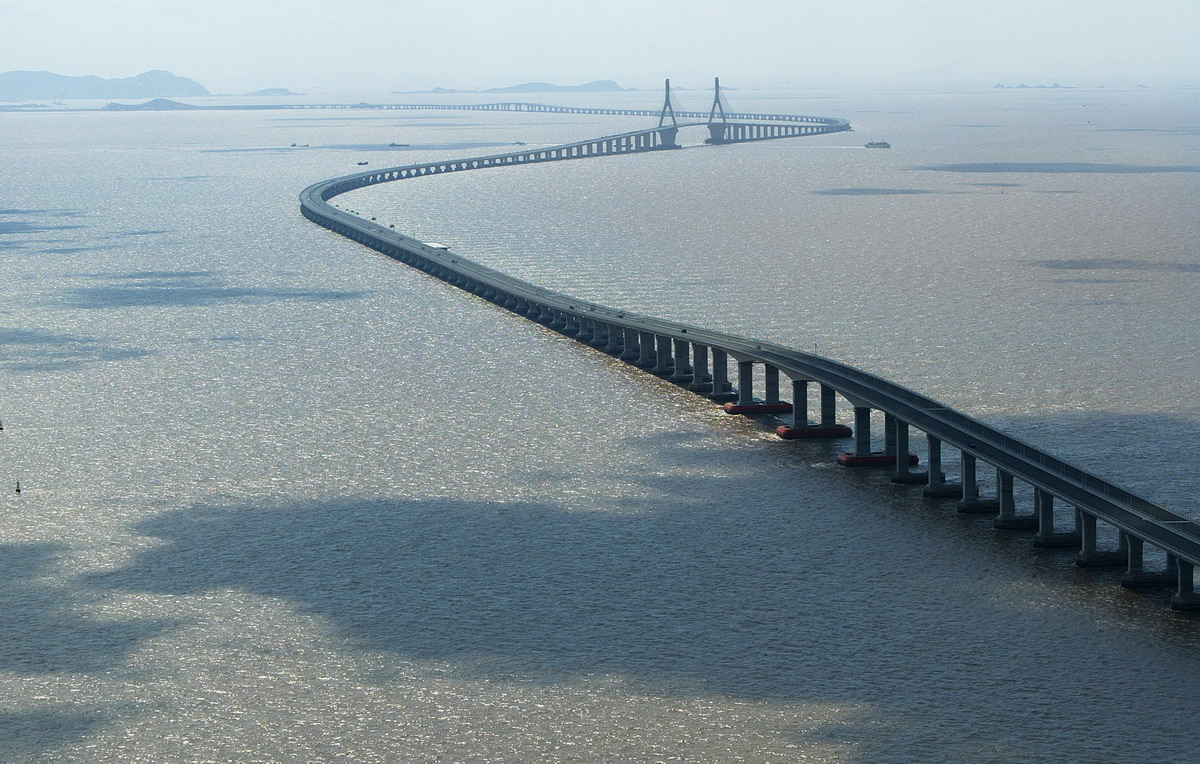
- Coordinates: 30°45.43′N 121°58.13′E
- Locale: Shanghai and Yangshan Port
- Other name: East Sea Bridge

Characteristics
- Design: Beam bridge with cable-stayed section
- Total length: 32.5 kilometres (20.2 mi)
- Longest span: 420 metres (1,380 ft)

History
- Opened: December 10, 2005

Location
- Interactive map of Donghai Bridge

Donghai Bridge (Chinese: t 東海大橋, s 东海大桥, p Dōnghǎi Dàqiáo, Wu Tonhe Dujiau lit. "East Sea Bridge") is a Chinese bridge counted among the longest cross-sea bridges in the world. It was completed on December 10, 2005. It has a total length of 32.5 kilometres (20.2 mi) and connects mainland Shanghai's Pudong New Area with the offshore Yangshan Deep-Water Port in Zhejiang's Shengsi County. Most of the bridge is a low-level viaduct. There are also cable-stayed sections to allow for the passage of large ships, the largest with a span of 420 metres (1,380 ft). Donghai Bridge is part of the S2 Hulu Expressway.

The bridge has a long and narrow speedway and does not allow vehicles that do not meet the weight requirements.

== Projects ==
On 29 January 2014, Shanghai's urban planning authorities announced that they would build a second bridge combining road and rail to help meet growing transport demands for the Yangshan Deep-Water Port. Plans from 2019 show that this second bridge is proposed to connect Shanghai to Ningbo via Yangshan port.

== See also ==
- Donghai Bridge Wind Farm
- Port of Shanghai
- Hangzhou Bay Bridge
- Qingdao Jiaozhou Bay Bridge
- List of bridges by length
- List of longest cable-stayed bridge spans
