= Zhoushan =

Prefecture-level city in Zhejiang, China

Zhoushan 舟山市 Chusan
- Prefecture-level city
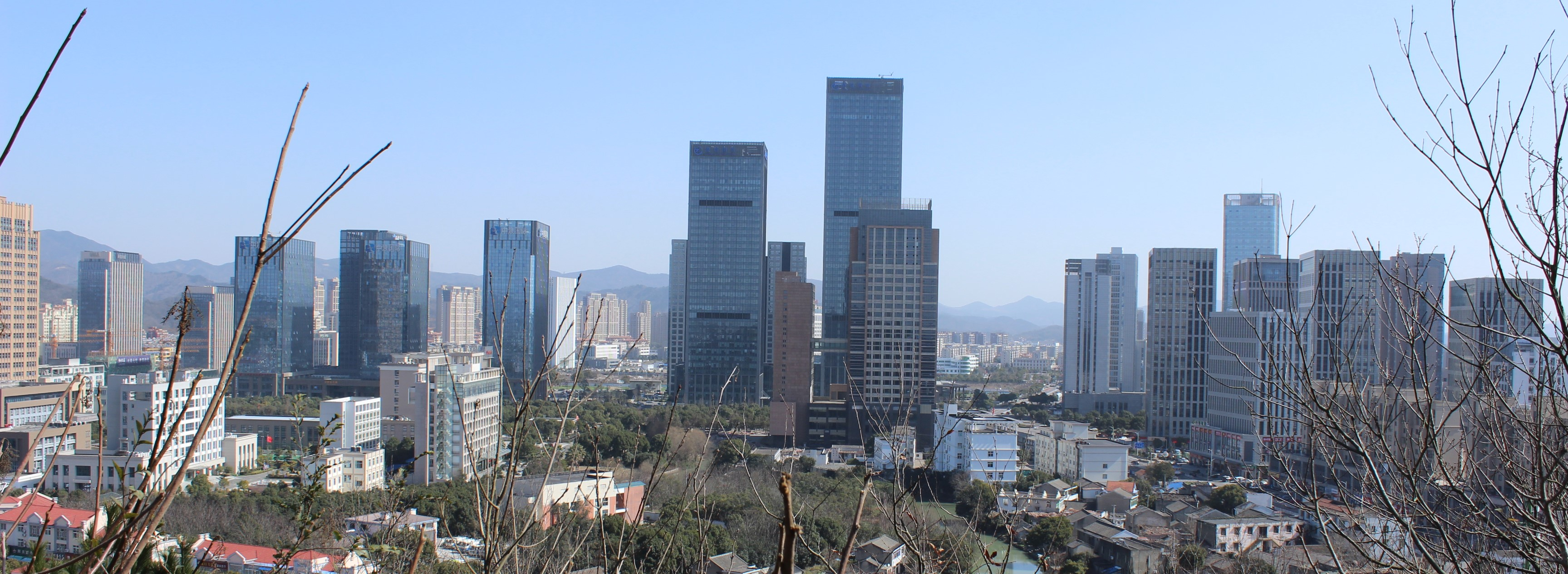
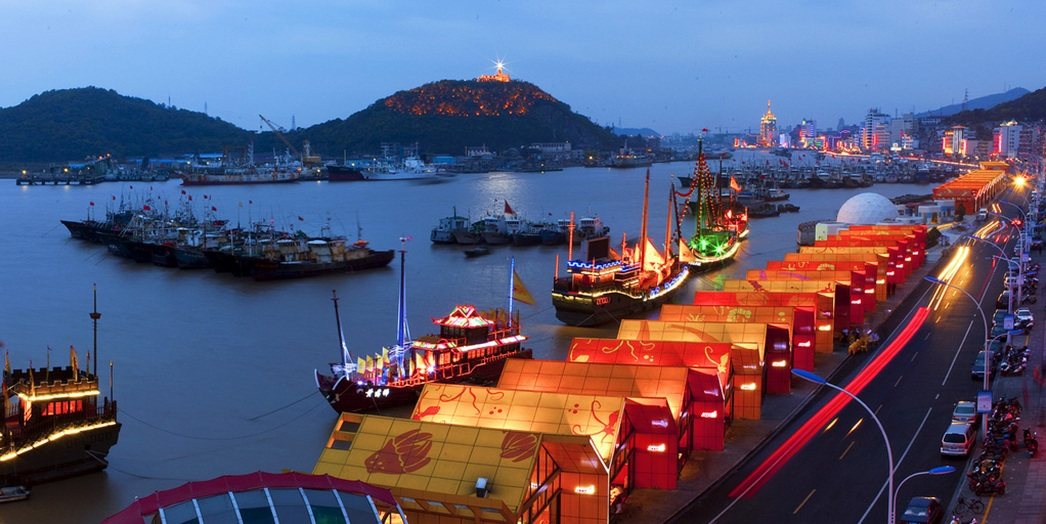
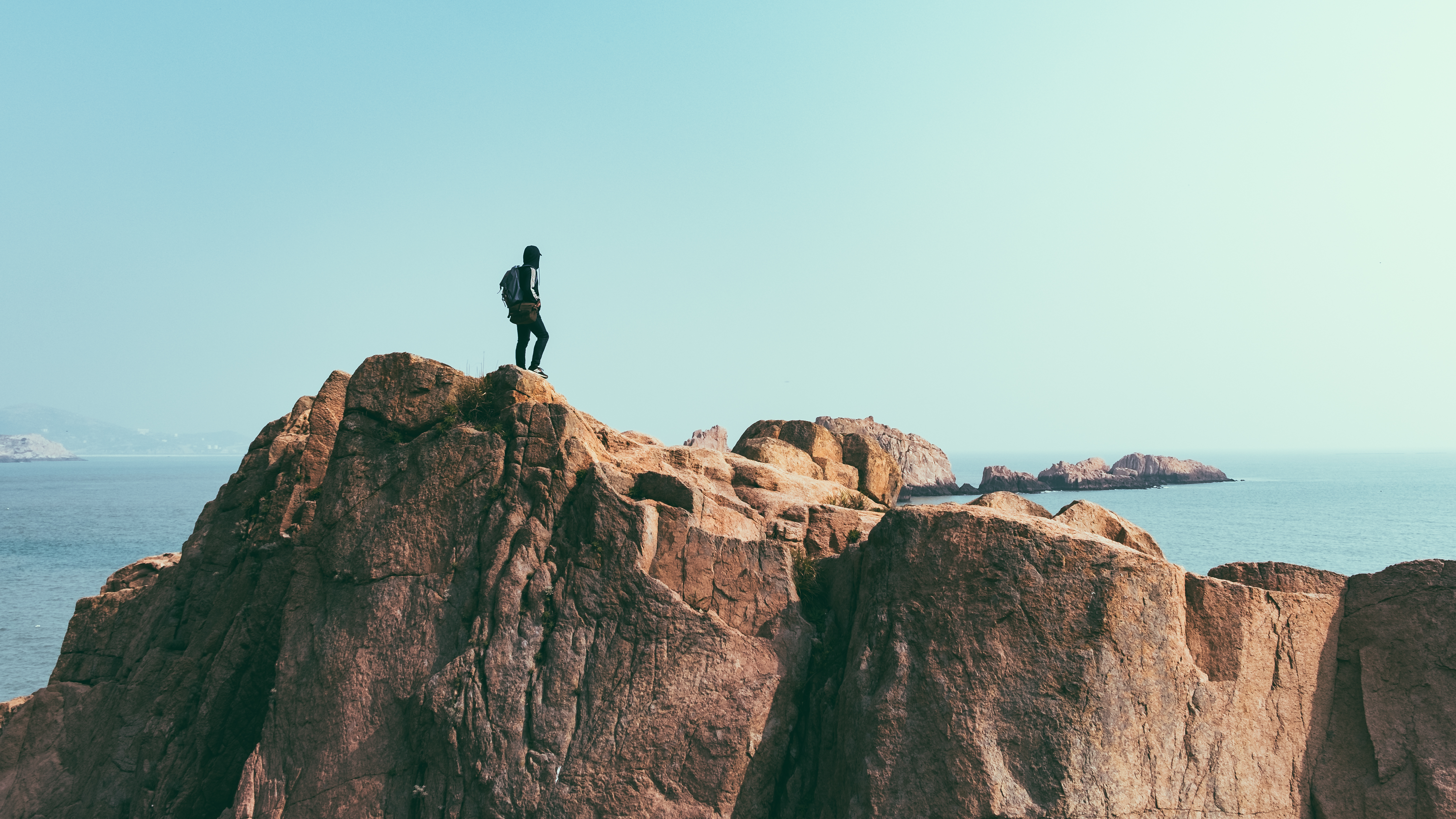
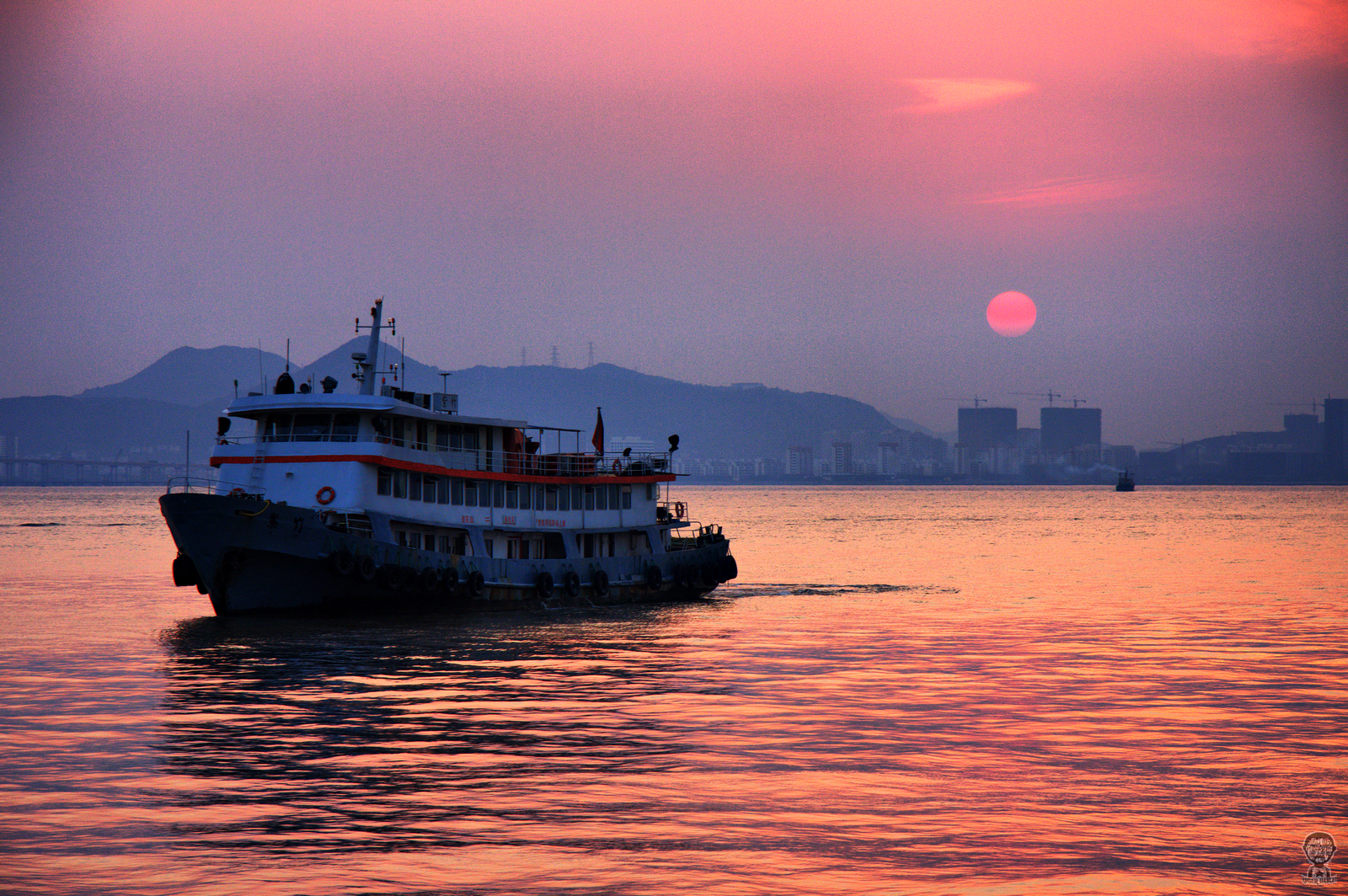
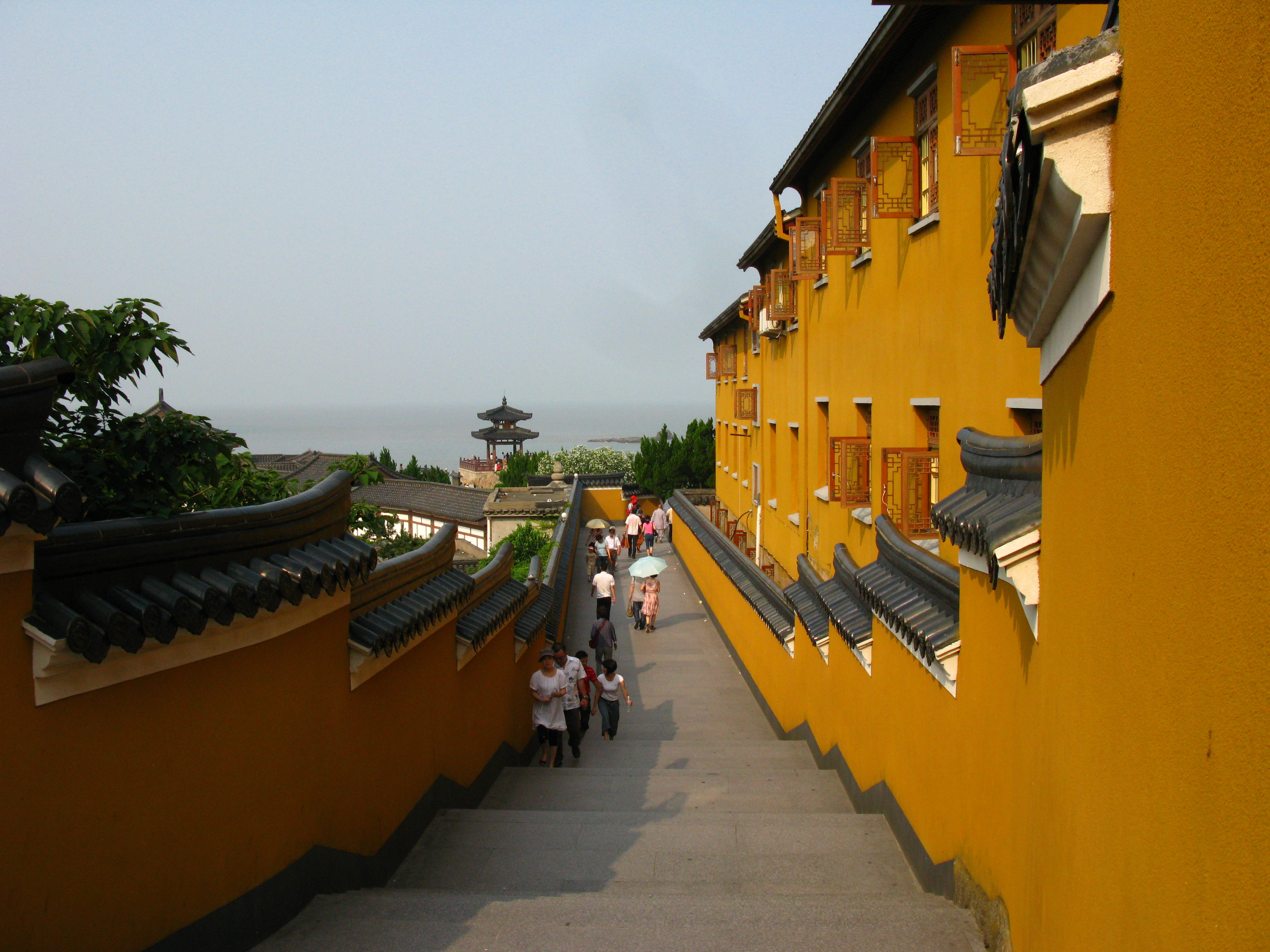
- Left to right, top to bottom: Downtown, Shenjiamen port at night, Guoqi island, ship off the Mount Putuo at sunset, street scene on the island of Mount Putuo.

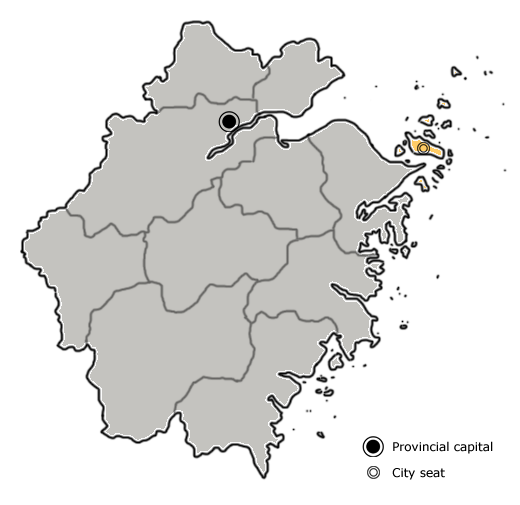
- Location in Zhejiang
- Coordinates (Zhoushan municipal government): 29°59′08″N 122°12′27″E
- Country: People's Republic of China
- Province: Zhejiang
- County divisions: 4
- Township divisions: 45
- County established: Tang dynasty
- Converted to prefecture-level city: 1987
- Municipal seat: Dinghai District

Government
  - CPC Secretary: Yu Donglai (俞东来)
  - Mayor: Wen Nuan (温暖)

Area
  - Prefecture-level city: 1,378 km^{2} (532 sq mi)
  - Urban: 980.02 km^{2} (378.39 sq mi)
  - Metro: 980.02 km^{2} (378.39 sq mi)

Population (2020 census)
  - Prefecture-level city: 1,157,817
  - Density: 840.2/km^{2} (2,176/sq mi)
  - Urban: 882,932
  - Urban density: 900.93/km^{2} (2,333.4/sq mi)
  - Metro: 882,932
  - Metro density: 900.93/km^{2} (2,333.4/sq mi)

GDP
  - Prefecture-level city: CN¥ 151.2 billion US$ 19.9 billion
  - Per capita: CN¥ 130,130; US$ 16,999
- Time zone: UTC+8 (China Standard)
- Postal code: 316000, 202450 for Shengsi County
- Area code: (0)580
- ISO 3166 code: CN-ZJ-09
- License Plate: 浙L
- Climate: Cfa
- Website: www.zhoushan.gov.cn (in Chinese)
- Symbols
- Flower: Neolitsea aurata
- Tree: Narcissus tazetta subsp. chinensis

Zhoushan
- Chinese: 舟山
- Wu: Cieu^{平}-se^{平} (Ningbonese); Tseu^{平}-sae^{平} (Shanghainese)
- Postal: Chusan
- Literal meaning: Barge Island (Note: A zhōu is a particular kind of "leaf"-shaped Chinese boat that is low, thin, long, and curving slightly from bow to stern. Shān is typically translated as "mountain" but also frequently refers to ranges (Chinese uses few plural forms), hills (properly 小山 or "little mountains"), and to islands ("mountains-in-the-sea") in proper names.)
Transcriptions
Standard Mandarin
- Hanyu Pinyin: Zhōushān
- Wade–Giles: Chou^{1}-shan^{1}
Wu
- Romanization: Cieu^{平}-se^{平} (Ningbonese); Tseu^{平}-sae^{平} (Shanghainese)
Yue: Cantonese
- Jyutping: Zau^{1}saan^{1}
Southern Min
- Hokkien POJ: Tsiu-san

Former names

Yongdong
- Simplified Chinese: 甬东
- Traditional Chinese: 甬東
- Literal meaning: [Land] East of Yong [Land] East of the Yong
Transcriptions
Standard Mandarin
- Hanyu Pinyin: Yǒngdōng
- Wade–Giles: Yung-tung

Wengshan
- Chinese: 翁山
- Literal meaning: Senior Island
Transcriptions
Standard Mandarin
- Hanyu Pinyin: Wēngshān
- Wade–Giles: Wêng-shan
Wu
- Romanization: On-se [oŋ se]

Changguo
- Simplified Chinese: 昌国
- Traditional Chinese: 昌國
- Literal meaning: Prosperous Country
Transcriptions
Standard Mandarin
- Hanyu Pinyin: Chāngguó
- Wade–Giles: Ch‘ang-kuo
Wu
- Romanization: Tshan-kueh [tsʰã kuəʔ]

Dinghai
- Chinese: 定海
- Literal meaning: Stabilizing the Sea
Transcriptions
Standard Mandarin
- Hanyu Pinyin: Dìnghǎi
- Wade–Giles: Ting-hai

Zhoushan (Note: , formerly romanized as Chusan) is a prefecture-level city in the eastern Chinese province of Zhejiang. (Note: The term "city" used here is a translation of a Chinese administrative level that originally referred to major markets. It does not refer to a single city covering all of the archipelago's islands but to a particular level of autonomy and privileges enjoyed by the prefectural government on account of its relative urbanization. Another prefecture-level "city" consisting entirely of islands is Hainan's Sansha Prefecture.) It consists of an archipelago of islands at the southern mouth of Hangzhou Bay off the mainland city of Ningbo. The prefecture's city proper is Dinghai on Zhoushan Island, now administered as the prefecture's Dinghai District. During the 2020 census, Zhoushan Prefecture's population was 1,157,817, out of whom 882,932 lived in the builtup (or metro) area consisting of two urban districts of Dinghai and Putuo.

== History ==
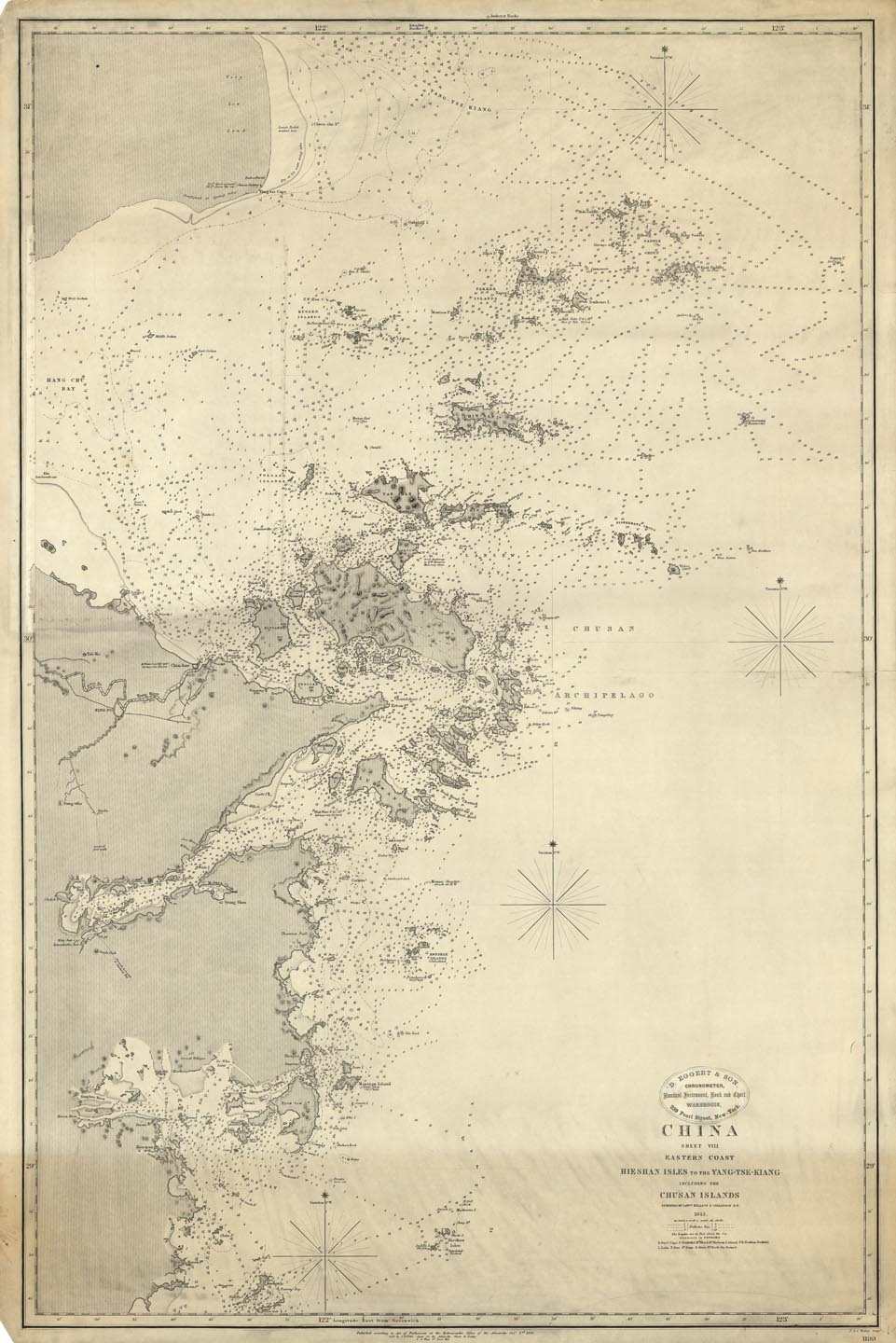
A map of the "Chusan Archipelago" published by the British Royal Navy surveys in 1843

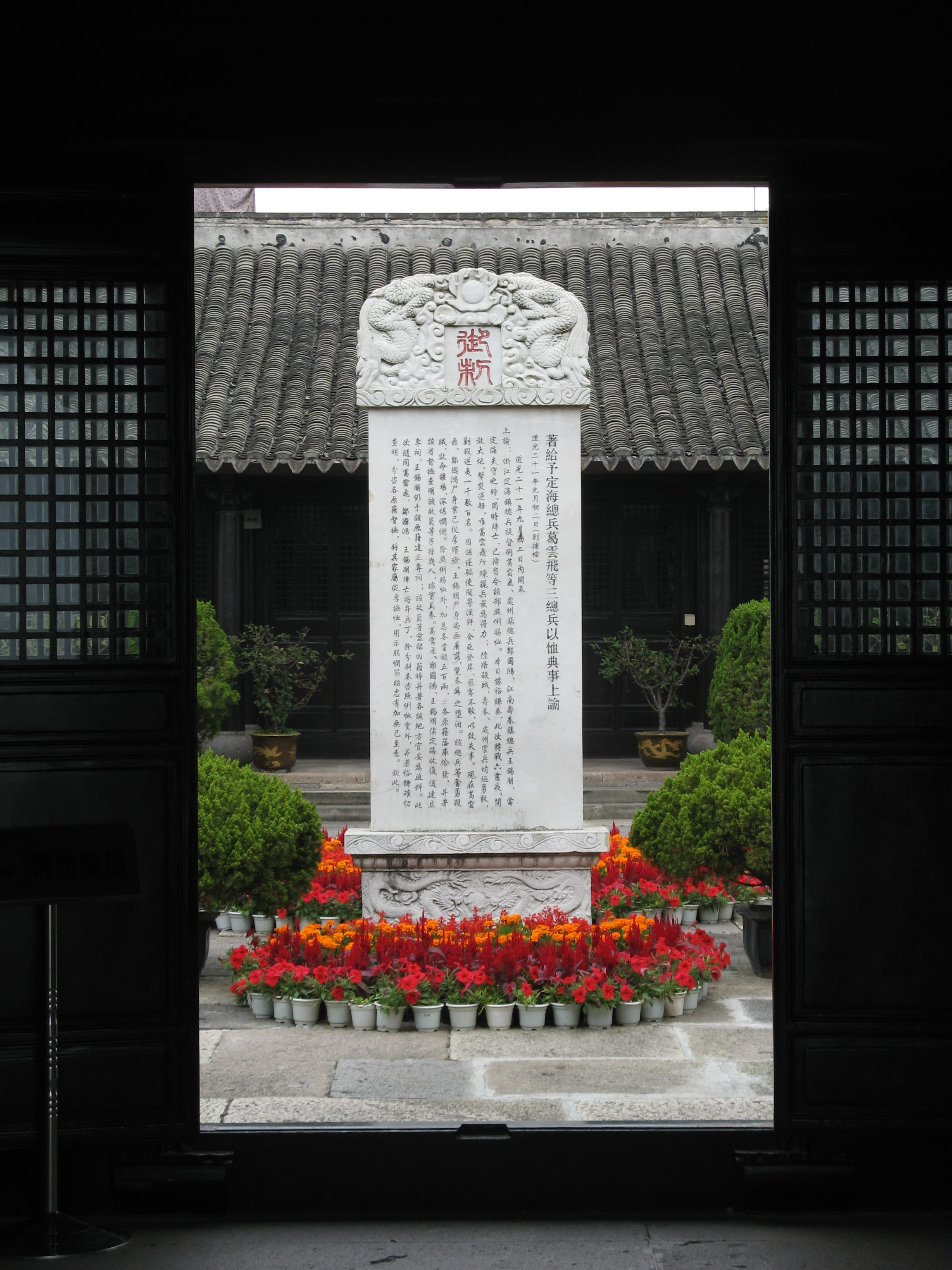
A replica of the stele recording the praise of the Daoguang Emperor of the Qing for the three generals who opposed the British during the Battle of Dinghai in the First Opium War.

The archipelago was inhabited 6,000 years ago, during the Neolithic by people of the Hemudu culture. During the Spring and Autumn period, Zhoushan was called Yongdong, referring to its location east of the Yong River. At the time, it belonged to the state of Yue. The fishermen and sailors who inhabited the islands often engaged in piracy and became recruits for uprisings against the central authorities. At the time of the Eastern Jin, the Zhoushan Islands served as the base for Sun En's rebellion. Sun En, an adherent of the Taoist sect the Way of the Five Pecks of Rice, launched his rebellion around the year 400 and was defeated by Jin forces in 402. Today's Zhoushan was first created as Wengshan County in Ming Prefecture in 738 under the Tang.

In 863, the Japanese Buddhist monk Egaku (慧萼) and a Putuoshan local Zhang-shi (张氏) placed a statue of Guanyin at Chaoyin Cave (潮音洞) that would later become a popular tourist and pilgrim destination. In 1073, under the Song, it was renamed Changguo County; this was upgraded to a prefecture in the early Yuan dynasty. During the Ming dynasty, especially between the years 1530 and 1560, Japanese and Chinese pirates used Zhoushan as one of their principal bases from which they launched attacks as far as Nanjing; "the whole Chinese coast from northern Shandong to western Guangdong was ravaged to a distance of sixty miles inland."

After suppression of the pirates, Zhoushan became an important commercial port of entry. Under the early Qing dynasty, it played a similar role to Xiamen and Guangzhou as a frequent port of call for Western traders. Changguo Prefecture became Dinghai County within Zhejiang Province in 1688 under the Qing. The restriction of all European trade to the port of Guangzhou in 1760 forced Westerners to leave Zhoushan. One of the requests of Lord Macartney's embassy to the Qianlong Emperor in 1793 was an acquisition of "a small unfortified island near Zhoushan for the residence of English traders, storage of goods, and outfitting of ships." The Qianlong Emperor denied this request together with all the rest.

British forces under Captain Charles Elliot captured Zhoushan on July 5–6, 1840 during the First Opium War and evacuated it in early 1841, after Elliot reached an agreement with Qishan, the Governor-General of Tianjin (Tientsin) and Grand Secretary to the Daoguang Emperor, in exchange for Hong Kong. At that time, Zhoushan was a well known port while Hong Kong was still only a fishing village. The British Foreign Secretary Palmerston was furious when he learned that Elliot agreed to the cede Zhoushan for Hong Kong, described as "a barren island with hardly a house on it". Elliot was dismissed in April 1841 for his blunder. His replacement Sir Henry Pottinger led a British fleet that recaptured Zhoushan on October 1, 1841. The First Opium War ended with conclusion of the Treaty of Nanjing in which China opened up the cities of Guangzhou ("Canton"), Fuzhou ("Foochow"), Xiamen ("Amoy"), Ningbo ("Ningpo"), and Shanghai to residence by British subjects for the purpose of trade. As a result, Britain no longer had any use for Zhoushan but it kept the island until 1846 as a guarantee for the treaty. Dinghai was upgraded to a directly controlled subprefecture (定海直隸廳) sometime in 1841.

Zhoushan was also occupied by the British in 1860 during the Second Opium War. Wang Yijun, a leader of the Taiping rebels, attempted to retake Zhoushan from its Qing garrison on February 13, 1862 but was defeated and killed.

Following the Xinhai Revolution and the establishment of the Republic of China, Dinghai Subprefecture reverted to a county. Sun Yat-sen visited Zhoushan on August 25, 1916, writing Sun Yat-sen's Travels in Putuo (遊普陀誌奇, You Putuo Zhiqi). On October 1, 1942, the Japanese ship Lisbon Maru was transporting 1,800 POWs to Tokyo when she was attacked by the USS Grouper off Qingbing (青浜) or Dongfu; one torpedo hit and she sank the next day. The fishermen of nearby Dongji (東極) rescued 384 of the British prisoners from the wreckage. Amid the Chinese Civil War, Dinghai County lost Shengsi, which became an Archipelago Directly controlled District (列島直屬區) of Jiangsu in 1946, then a separate county in October 1949. The same year, Dinghai County was divided into Dinghai and Wengzhou (翁洲) Counties. In November, the Communists landed on Dengbu Island, but were repulsed by the defenders.

Nevertheless, Zhoushan was overrun by the Communists on May 17, 1950. Wengzhou was merged back into Dinghai County, which made up part of Ningbo Prefecture, and Shengsi made up a special area (特区) and then county of the Songjiang Prefecture, then still part of Jiangsu. In March 1953, the Council of Ministers opted to establish the Zhoushan Prefecture, returning Shengsi and dividing Dinghai into Dinghai, Putuo, and Daishan. Ningbo's Xiangshan County was also briefly incorporated into this new prefecture from 1954 to 1958. From 1958 to May 1962, Zhoushan was incorporated into Ningbo before becoming a separate prefecture again. Shengsi was temporarily assigned to Shanghai in the early 1960s. The short-lived Daqu County (大衢縣) was created in 1962 before being redivided between Daishan and Shengsi four years later.

Zhoushan was promoted to a prefecture-level "city" on January 27, 1987, with Dinghai and Putuo Counties upgraded to districts. The municipal People's Government was established on March 8 of that year. April of the same year, the ports of Zhoushan became open to foreign ships. On April 10, 1988, it became a coastal economic open zone.

== Administrative divisions ==
Zhoushan administers two districts and two counties. The city currently consists of 36 township-level divisions, including 17 towns, 5 townships and 14 subdistricts. Detailed divisions are listed as follows.

Map
Subdivision	Hanzi	Pinyin	Population (2010)	Terrestrial Area (km^{2})
Dinghai District	定海区	Dìnghǎi Qū	464,184	568.8
Putuo District	普陀区	Pǔtuó Qū	378,805	458.6
Daishan County	岱山县	Dàishān Xiàn	202,164	326.5
Shengsi County	嵊泗县	Shèngsì Xiàn	76,108	86

- Dinghai District (13 divisions, including 10 sub-districts and 3 towns)
  - Sub-district: Jiefang (解放), Changguo (昌国), Huannan (環南), Chengdong (城東), Yancang (盐倉), Lincheng (临城), Qiandao (千島), Xiaosha (小沙), Ma'ao (馬岙), Cengang (岑港)
  - Town: Baiquan (白泉), Jintang (金塘), Ganlan (干𬒗)
- Putuo District (9 divisions, including 4 sub-districts and 5 towns)
  - Sub-district: Shenjiamen (沈家门), Donggang (东港), Zhanmao (展茅), Zhujiajian (朱家尖)
  - Town: Putuoshan (普陀山), Dongji (东极), Taohua (桃花), Xiazhi (蝦峙), Liuheng (六橫)
- Daishan County (7 divisions, including 6 towns and 1 township)
  - Town: Gaoting (高亭), Qushan (衢山), Changtu (長涂), Dongsha (東沙), Daidong (岱東), Daixi (岱西)
  - Township: Xiushan (秀山)
- Shengsi County (7 divisions, including 3 towns and 4 townships)
  - Town: Caiyuan (菜園), Yangshan (洋山), Shengshan (嵊山)
  - Township: Wulong (五龍), Huanglong (黃龍), Gouqi (枸杞), Huaniao (花鳥)

In particular, Qiandao and Lincheng sub-districts of Dinghai District are governed by a special new town administration committee of Zhoushan.

== Geography ==
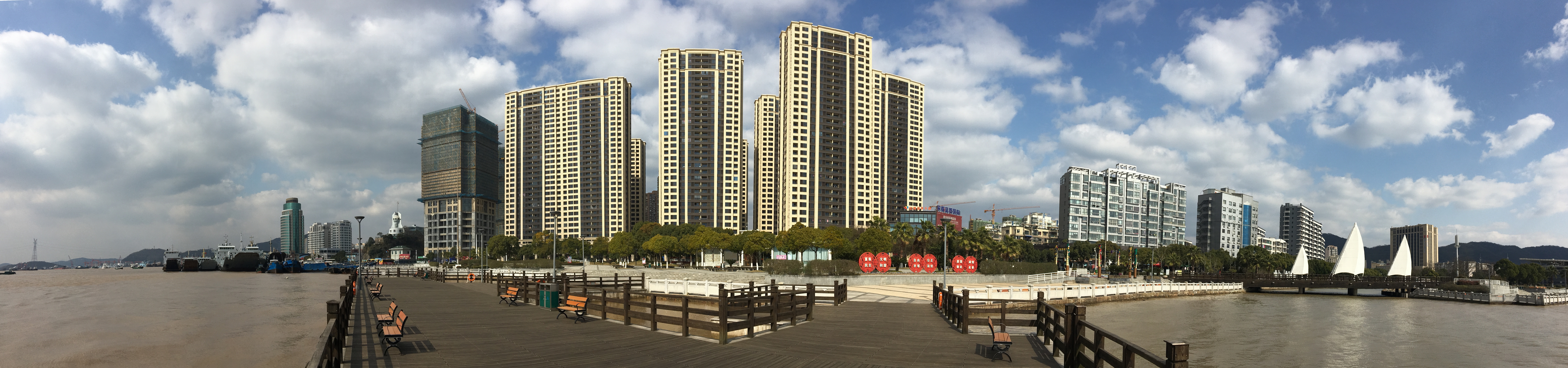
Skyline of Dinghai harbor waterfront

The Zhoushan Archipelago, comprising 1,390 islands and 3,306 reefs, is outside of Hangzhou Bay. It is the largest archipelago of China. Among these islands, 103 are inhabited all year round, 58 are larger than 1 square kilometer (0.39 sq mi), and only 12 have populations over 10,000. Below is a list of major inhabited islands.

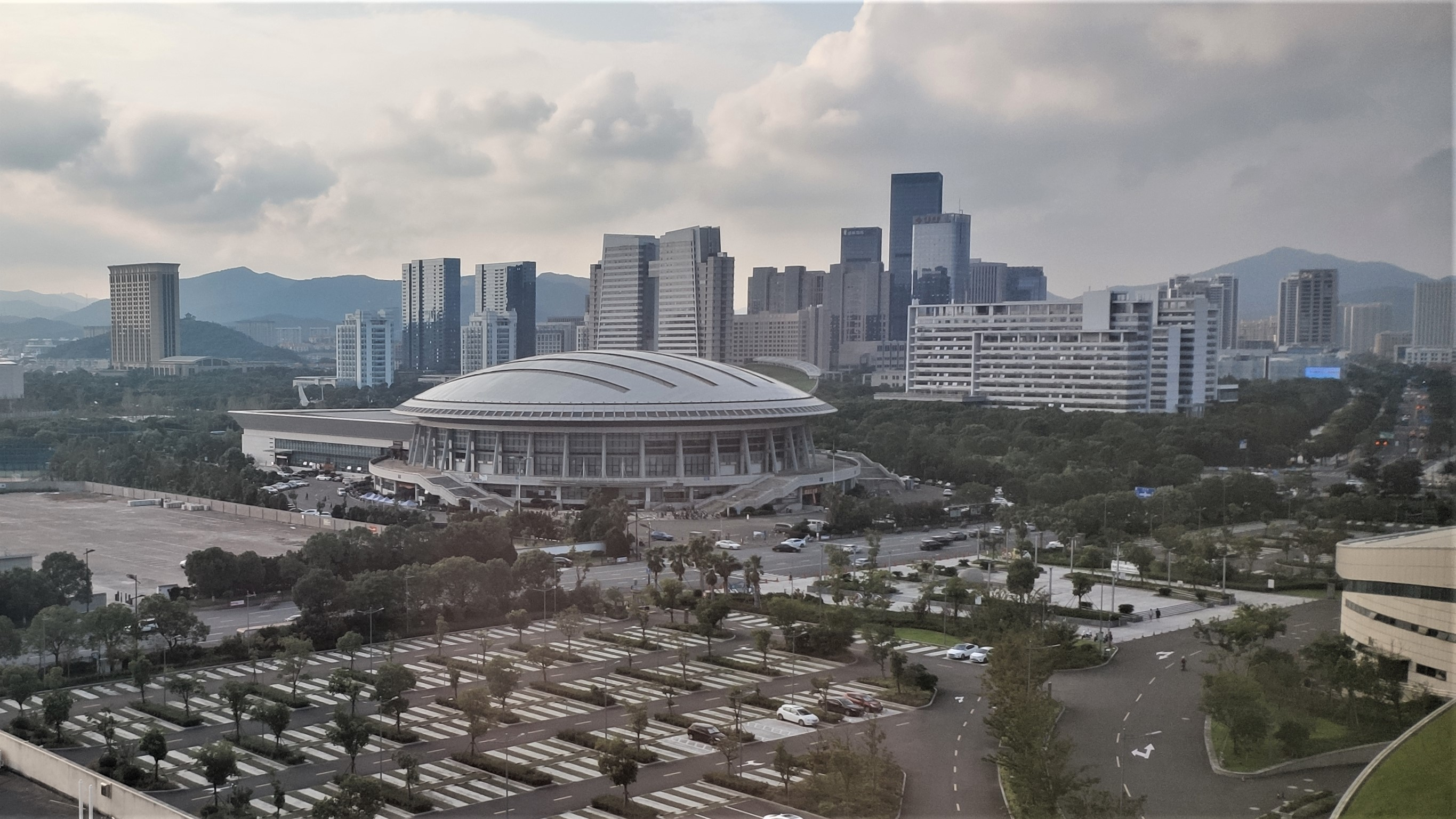
Xincheng is the new city center of Zhoushan

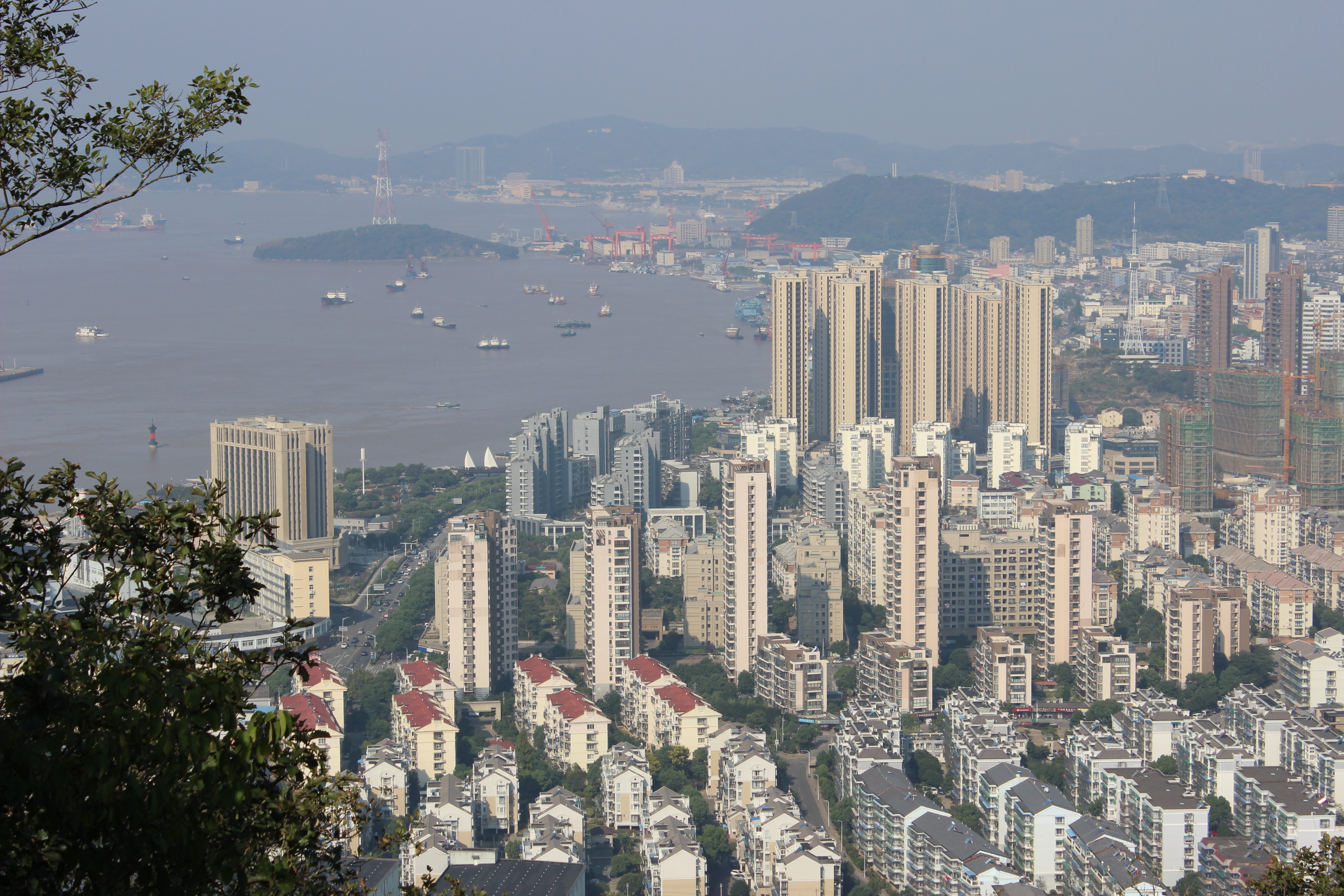
A bird's-eye view of Dinghai harbor

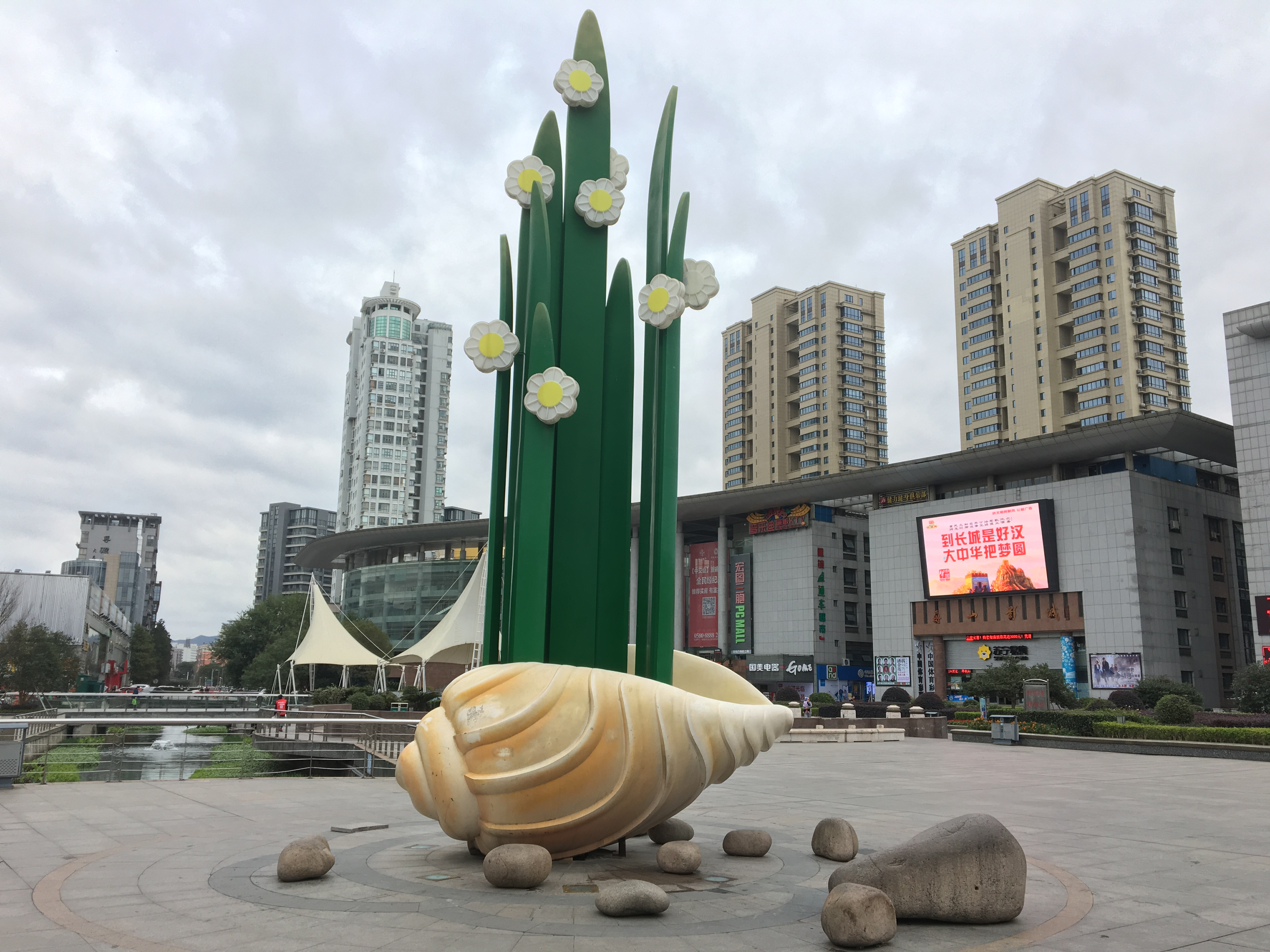
Cultural Square is the civic center of Dinghai. The "Sea Snail and Narcissus" urban sculpture, at its entrance, is the symbol of Zhoushan.

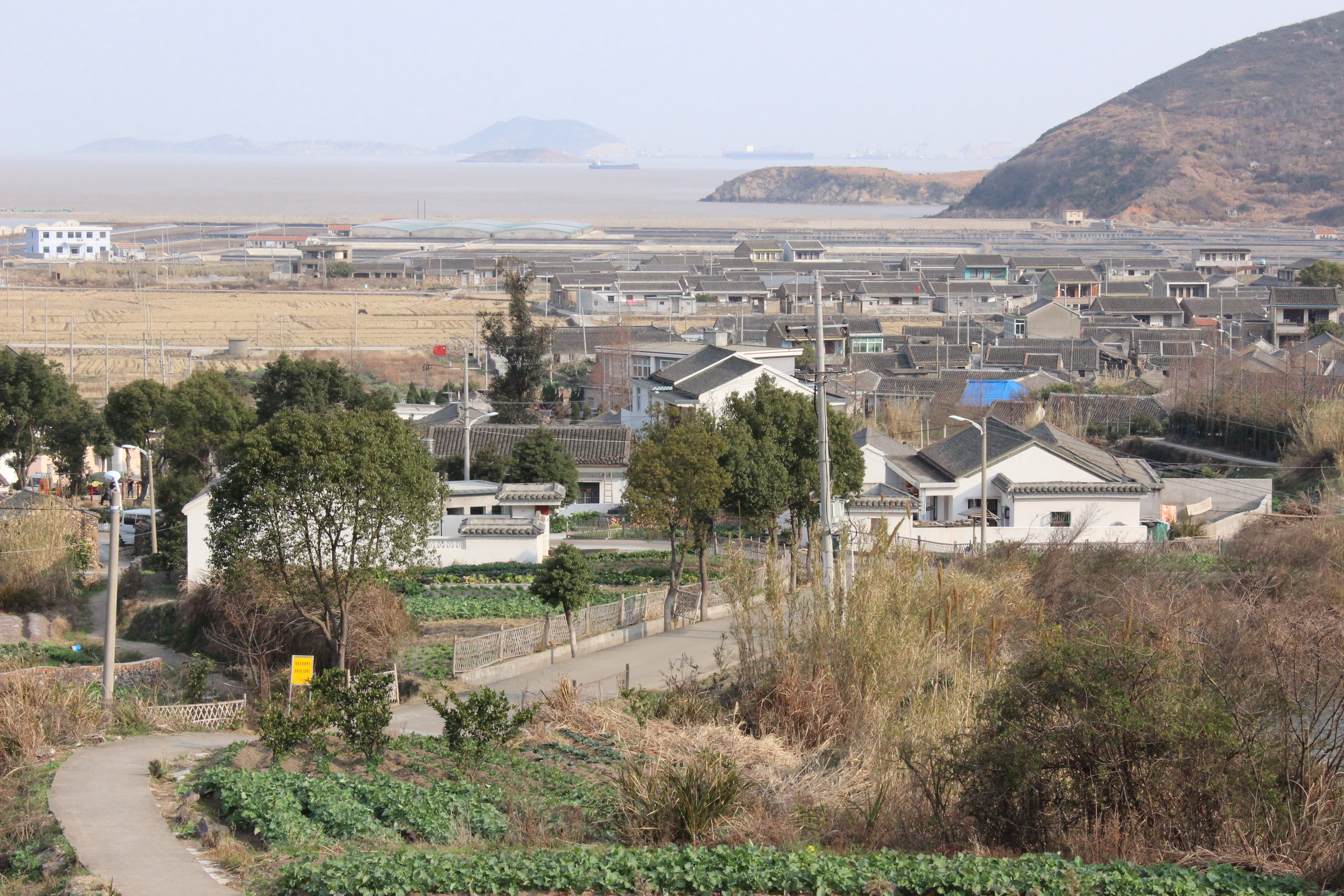
Panorama of Hou'an Community of Changbai Island, Xiaosha Sub-District, Dinghai District

(DH = Dinghai District, PT = Putuo District, DS = Daishan County, SS = Shengsi County)

There are six major islands (over 50 km^{2} (19 sq mi)):

- Zhoushan Island (舟山岛), 502.65 km^{2} (194.07 sq mi), 635,595 (DH/PT)
- Daishan Island (岱山岛), 119.32 km^{2} (46.07 sq mi), 111,765 (DS)
- Liuheng Island (六横岛), 109.40 km^{2} (42.24 sq mi), 59,102 (PT)
- Jintang Island (金塘岛), 82.11 km^{2} (31.70 sq mi), 37,321 (DH)
- Zhujiajian Island (朱家尖岛), 75.84 km^{2} (29.28 sq mi), 27,981 (PT)
- Qushan Island (衢山岛/大衢岛), 73.57 km^{2} (28.41 sq mi), 53,016 (DS)

There are 11 middle-size islands (between 10 and 50 km^{2} (3.9 and 19.3 sq mi)):

- Taohua Island (桃花岛), 44.43 km^{2} (17.15 sq mi), 10,867 (PT)
- Greater Changtu Island (大长涂山), 40.62 km^{2} (15.68 sq mi), 1,750 (DS)
- Xiushan Island (秀山岛), 26.33 km^{2} (10.17 sq mi), 10,106 (DS)
- Sijiao Island (泗礁山), 25.88 km^{2} (9.99 sq mi), 39,008 (SS)
- Xiazhi Island (虾峙岛), 18.59 km^{2} (7.18 sq mi), 11,247 (PT)
- Dengbu Island (登步岛), 16.72 km^{2} (6.46 sq mi), 2,479 (PT)
- Mount Putuo (普陀山), 16.06 km^{2} (6.20 sq mi), 10,337 (PT)
- Cezi Island (册子岛), 14.97 km^{2} (5.78 sq mi), 6,334 (DH)
- Changbai Island (长白岛), 14.16 km^{2} (5.47 sq mi), 3,066 (DH)
- Lesser Changtu Island (小长涂山), 13.33 km^{2} (5.15 sq mi), 19,750 (DS)
- Dayu Island (大鱼山), 11.03 km^{2} (4.26 sq mi), 788 (DS)

Zhoushan includes 20,800 km^{2} (8,031 sq mi) of marine territory, but only 1,440.12 km^{2} (556 sq mi) of land, 183.19 km^{2} (71 sq mi) of which are submerged during high tides. It is 182 km (113 mi) east-west and 169 km (105 mi) north-south and although heavily populated now has few farms.

== Climate ==
Zhoushan has a four-season, monsoon-influenced humid subtropical climate (Köppen Cfa), with cool, damp winters, and hot, humid summers. Conditions, especially during summer, are generally moderated by the surrounding waters of the East China Sea, bringing a January average of 6.2 °C (43.2 °F) and August average of 27.8 °C (82.0 °F), with an annual mean of 17.1 °C (62.8 °F). The highest temperature on record was 42.3 °C (108.1 °F) on 8 August 2013, which is 1.7 °C higher than the second highest temperature. Precipitation is significant throughout the year, with the greatest rainfall during summer. With 1,823.7 hours of bright sunshine annually, ranging from 30% sunshine in June to 53% in July and August, the second half of the year is sunnier.

Climate data for Zhoushan (Dinghai District), elevation 36 m (118 ft), (1991–2020 normals, extremes 1955–present)
Month	Jan	Feb	Mar	Apr	May	Jun	Jul	Aug	Sep	Oct	Nov	Dec	Year
Record high °C (°F)	24.0 (75.2)	28.0 (82.4)	30.4 (86.7)	32.1 (89.8)	33.6 (92.5)	36.7 (98.1)	40.2 (104.4)	42.3 (108.1)	38.6 (101.5)	34.0 (93.2)	28.7 (83.7)	27.5 (81.5)	42.3 (108.1)
Mean daily maximum °C (°F)	9.9 (49.8)	11.2 (52.2)	14.5 (58.1)	19.6 (67.3)	24.0 (75.2)	27.1 (80.8)	31.3 (88.3)	31.6 (88.9)	28.1 (82.6)	23.6 (74.5)	18.6 (65.5)	12.8 (55.0)	21.0 (69.9)
Daily mean °C (°F)	6.2 (43.2)	7.2 (45.0)	10.3 (50.5)	15.1 (59.2)	19.8 (67.6)	23.5 (74.3)	27.5 (81.5)	27.8 (82.0)	24.5 (76.1)	19.8 (67.6)	14.7 (58.5)	8.9 (48.0)	17.1 (62.8)
Mean daily minimum °C (°F)	3.5 (38.3)	4.2 (39.6)	7.1 (44.8)	11.5 (52.7)	16.5 (61.7)	20.8 (69.4)	24.8 (76.6)	25.2 (77.4)	21.8 (71.2)	16.8 (62.2)	11.7 (53.1)	5.9 (42.6)	14.2 (57.5)
Record low °C (°F)	−6.1 (21.0)	−4.9 (23.2)	−3.0 (26.6)	0.8 (33.4)	7.2 (45.0)	12.8 (55.0)	17.7 (63.9)	18.8 (65.8)	12.6 (54.7)	5.7 (42.3)	0.2 (32.4)	−4.5 (23.9)	−6.1 (21.0)
Average precipitation mm (inches)	77.6 (3.06)	78.5 (3.09)	125.4 (4.94)	105.6 (4.16)	125.2 (4.93)	208.3 (8.20)	116.4 (4.58)	188.3 (7.41)	173.2 (6.82)	113.1 (4.45)	81.8 (3.22)	79.1 (3.11)	1,472.5 (57.97)
Average precipitation days (≥ 0.1 mm)	12.1	11.4	15.3	13.7	13.7	15.8	10.6	12.3	12.6	9.0	11.2	10.8	148.5
Average snowy days	2.7	2.1	0.7	0.0	0.0	0.0	0.0	0.0	0.0	0.0	0.0	0.8	6.3
Average relative humidity (%)	75	76	77	77	80	86	83	82	79	75	76	73	78
Mean monthly sunshine hours	109.9	112.4	132.8	159.9	163.6	124.4	226.9	214.1	167.7	165.1	122.4	124.5	1,823.7
Percentage possible sunshine	34	36	36	41	39	30	53	53	46	47	39	39	41
Source: China Meteorological Administration all-time extreme temperature All-time October high extremes NOAA

== Demographics ==
According to the report from the Sixth National Population Census of the People's Republic of China, the total population of Zhoushan Municipality is 1,121,261 with 588,414 males and 532,847 females as of 1 November 2010, among which an overwhelmingly majority is Han Chinese (1,109,813). The number of households is about 454,800. For an administrative division distribution, Dinghai District has a population of 464,184, Putuo District has a population of 378,805, Daishan County has a population of 202,164 and Shengsi County has a population of 76,108. In terms of education attainment, about 10 percent of the total population (115,286) has received higher education, while a population of 77,577 is illiterate or semiliterate. In terms of age distribution, there is a child (aged 0–14) population of 114,265 and a senior population of 176,331.

== Economy ==
Traditionally Zhoushan had relied heavily on the primary sector, especially fishing, given Zhoushan is the largest fishery in China. Nowadays with the development of the secondary and tertiary sectors, Zhoushan's economic base has been largely diversified. Ship building and repairing, shipping, light industry, tourism and service industry grow to be the major contributors of local economic output. In 2016, the entire municipality achieved a total Gross Domestic Product (GDP) of 122.85 billion yuan (approximately 16,013 US dollars per capita), with an increase of 11.3% from the previous year. The city continuously ranked 3rd among 11 municipalities of Zhejiang Province. However, since Zhoushan has a significantly smaller population compared with other municipalities, the absolute figure of total GDP still ranked the last place in the province. The structure of three sectors of industry is 10.6 : 39.8 : 49.6. In 2012, Zhoushan Port alone processed 290,990 kilotons of cargo. If combined with Ningbo Port (Ningbo and Zhoushan Ports are essentially one port with shared infrastructure, harbor basin and administrative collaboration), the entire greater port handled approximately 744,000 kilotons of cargo, surpassing Shanghai Port to be world's new busiest port in terms of cargo tonnage.

In 2012, Zhoushan's per capita disposable income of urban residents reached 34,224 yuan, with a 12.2% increase from the previous year (an increase of 10.3% considering the price and inflation factors). On the other hand, Zhoushan's per capital net income of rural residents reached 18,601 yuan, with a 12.9% increase from the previous year (an increase of 11.0% considering the price and inflation factors). The Engel's Coefficients for urban and rural residents are 35.9% and 38.1% respectively. The average housing building areas are 32.39 and 49.10 square meters for urban and rural residents respectively.

== Transportation ==
Zhoushan is served by different modes of transportation, including air, highway and water. The transportation condition in Zhoushan has been improved largely during recent years, especially after the opening of Zhoushan Trans-Oceanic Bridges in 2009, which established a stable corridor connecting to the continent and converted Zhoushan into a peninsula per se. Due to geographical isolation, Zhoushan is the only one of the municipalities in Zhejiang Province which is not served with rail transportation.

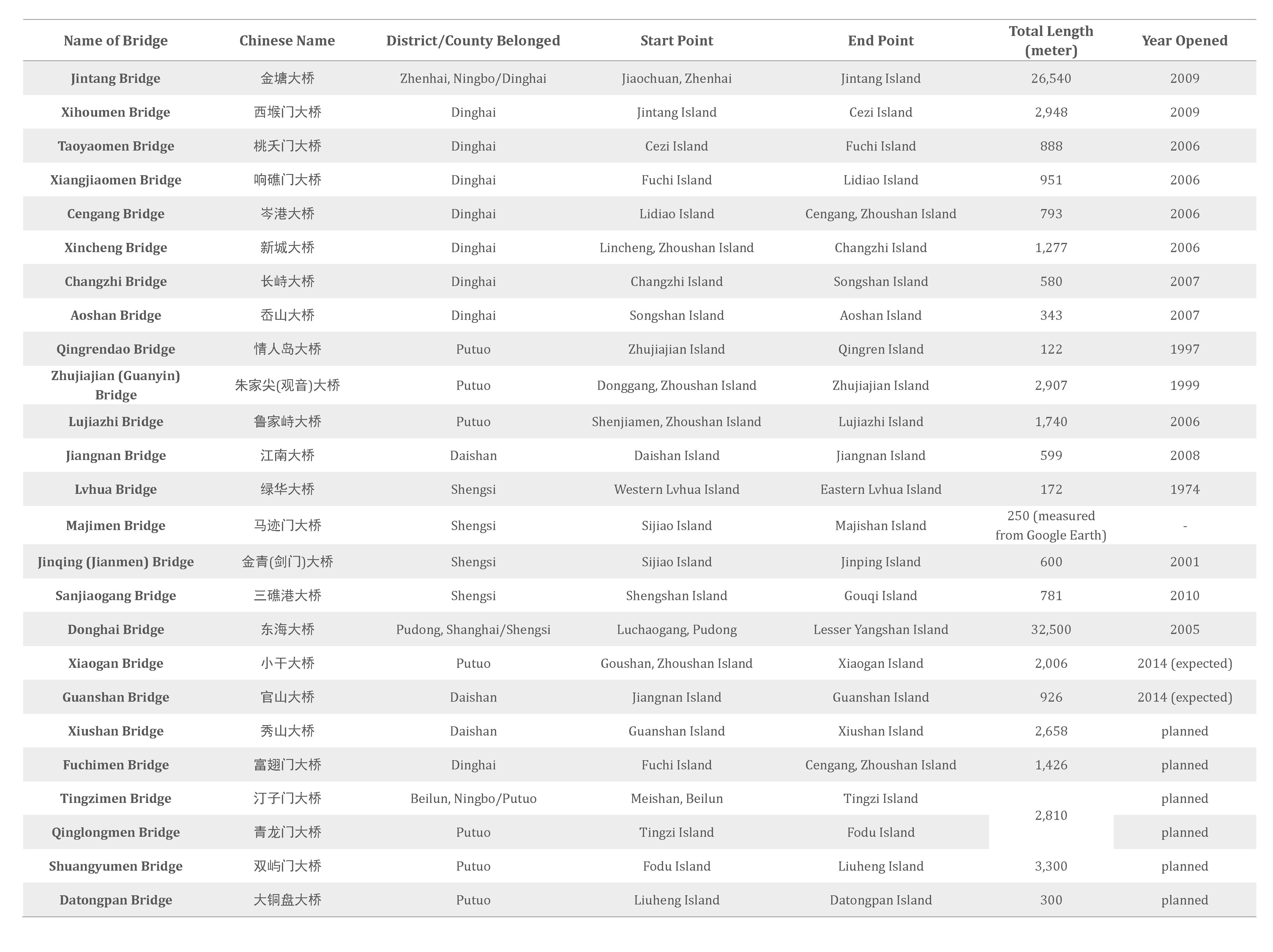
List of Zhoushan bridges detailed with names, districts and counties belonged, start and end points, total lengths and dates opened

=== Air transportation ===
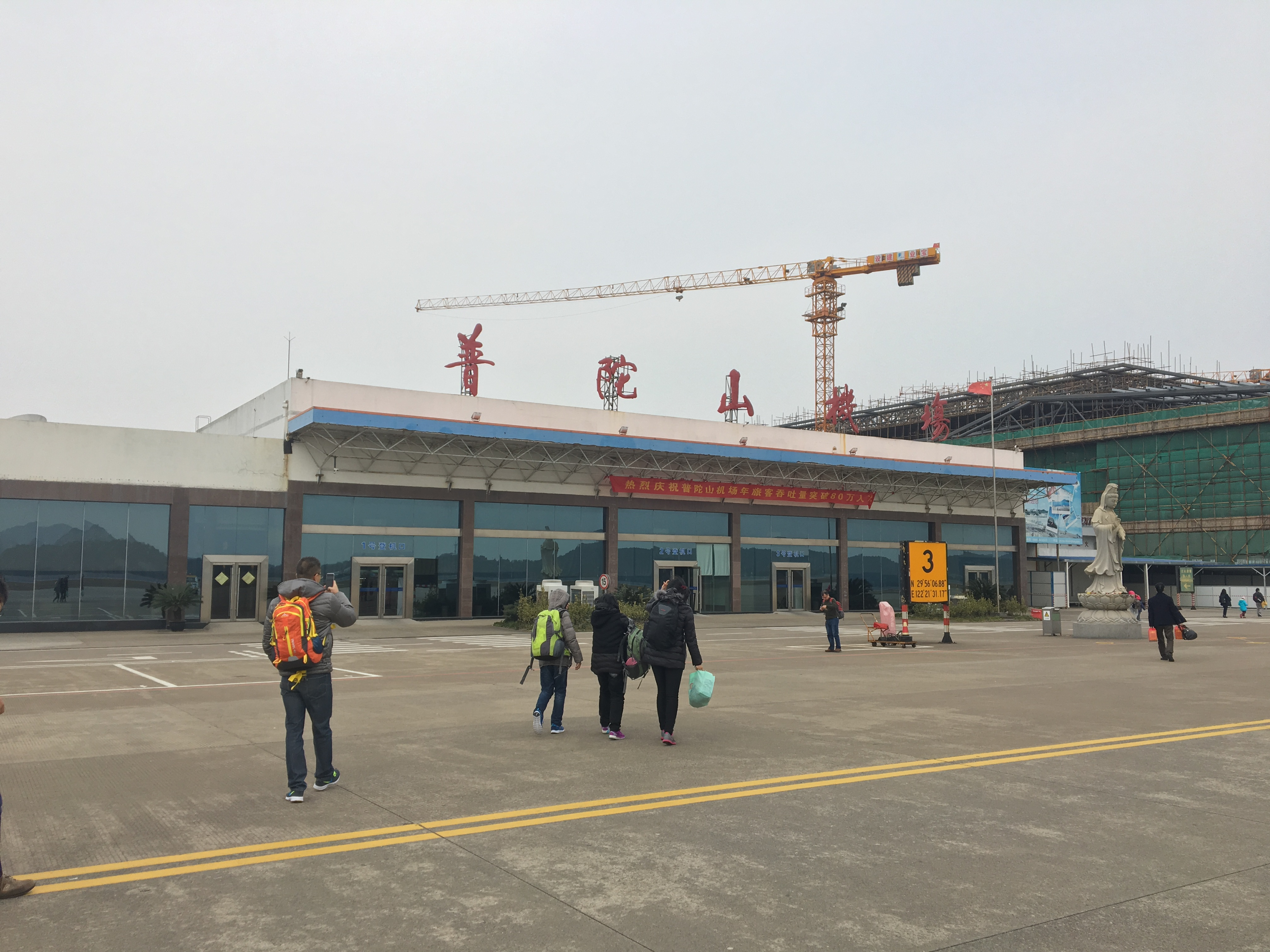
Zhoushan Putuoshan Airport

- Although named after Mt. Putuo, Zhoushan Putuoshan International Airport is located on Zhujiajian Island, and is a domestic hub with scheduled passenger flights to several cities in China, including Shanghai, Beijing, Guangzhou, Shenzhen, Xiamen, Fuzhou, Hefei, Lianyungang, Jieyang and Jinjiang. The construction of the airport began in March 1997 and completed in August 1997 with an investment of 410 million RMB yuan, and is rated as a 4D airport. As of 2016, Zhoushan Airport is the 86th largest civic airport in Mainland China in terms of passengers handled with a total of 800.9 thousand users. Expansion including a new terminal and 2,500 by 23 meters (8,202 by 75 ft) taxiway is under construction.

=== Road transportation ===
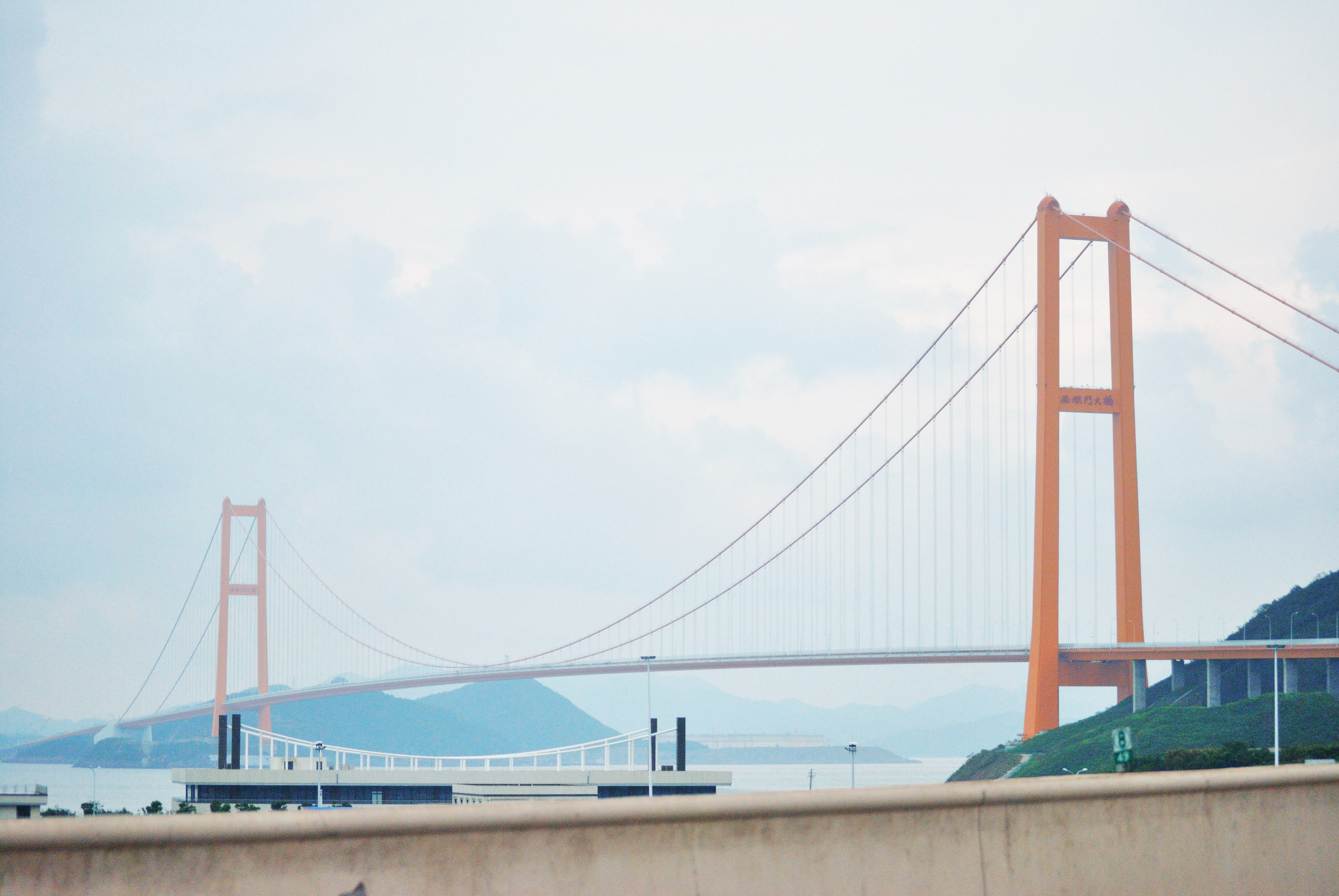
Xihoumen Bridge

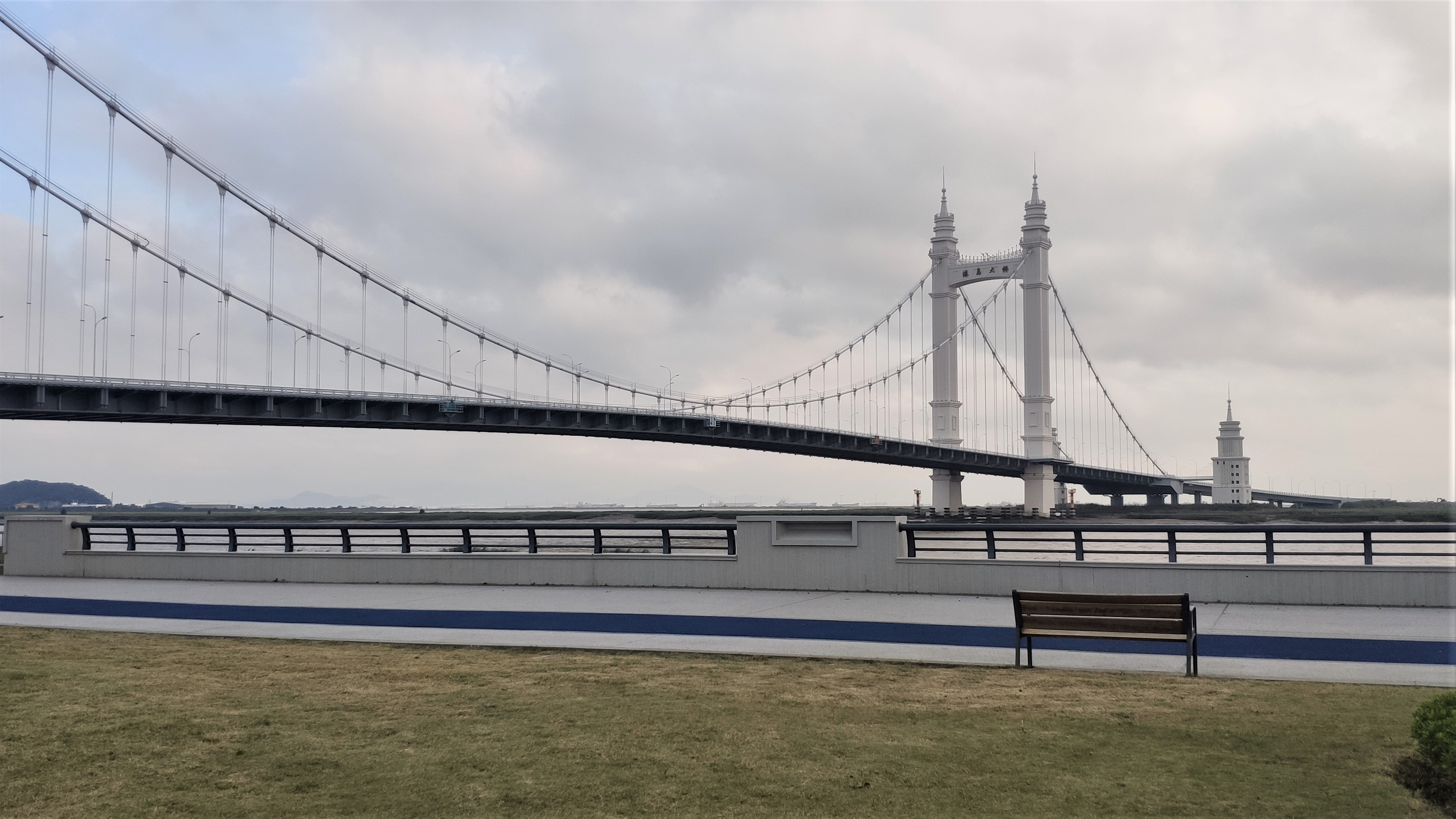
Gangdao Bridge connects Zhoushan Island with Xiaogan Island

- Zhoushan Trans-Oceanic Bridges (舟山跨海大桥 or 舟山大陆连岛工程), the indispensable component of Yongzhou Expressway (甬舟高速) (numbered G9211 in the National Trunk Highway System), consist of five consecutive bridges which connect Zhoushan to the mainland, Zhenhai District of Ningbo to be specific. These five bridges are Cengang Bridge (岑港大桥), Xiangjiaomen Bridge (响礁门大桥), Taoyaomen Bridge (桃夭门大桥), Xihoumen Bridge (西堠门大桥) and Jintang Bridge (金塘大桥). The painstaking huge project, started in 1999 and completed in 2010, is the largest bridge group in China. Xihoumen Bridge, in particular, is the world's second-longest suspension bridge in terms of the length of the central span.

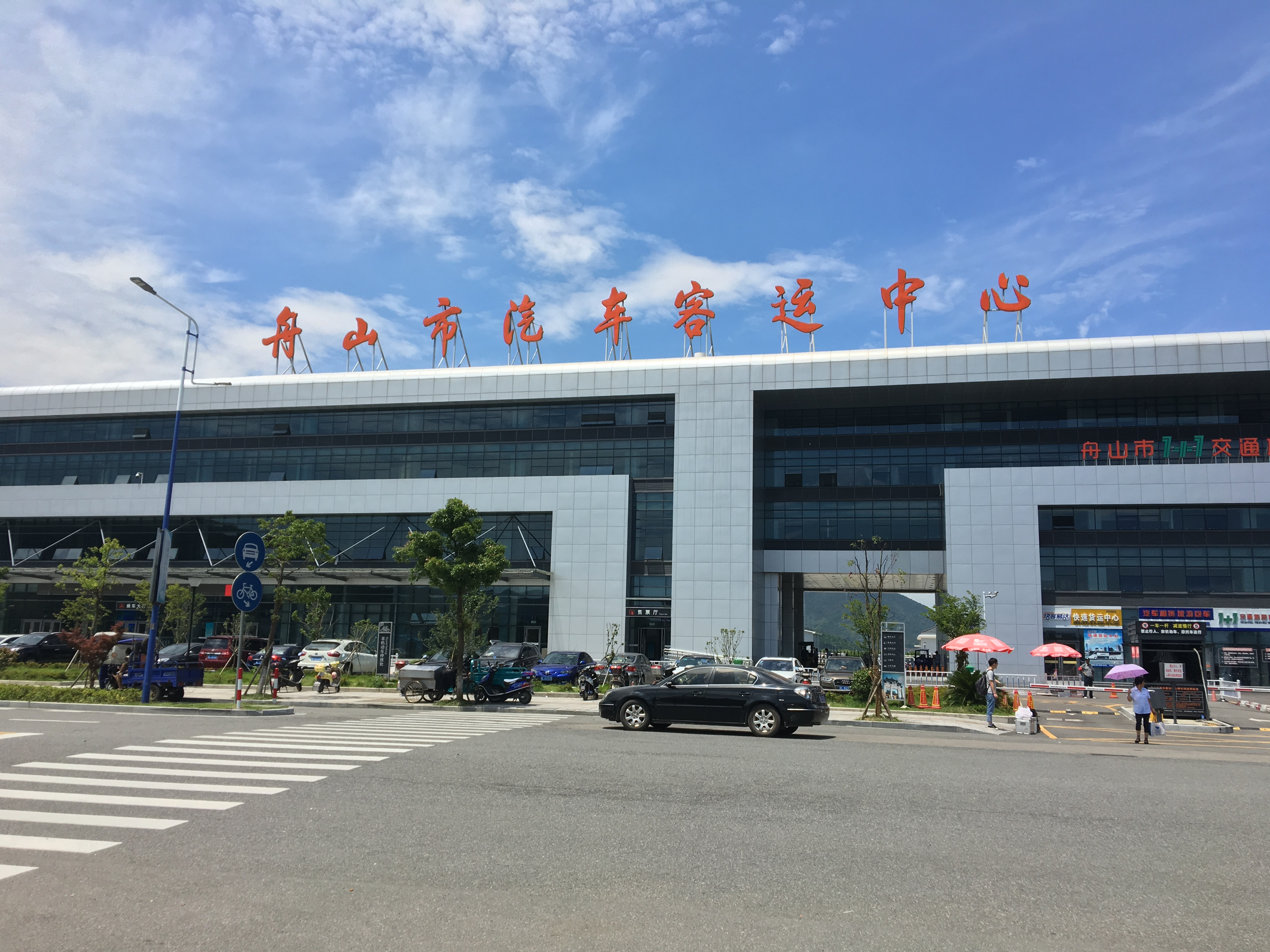
Zhoushan Bus Terminal

- China National Highway 329, which starts from Hangzhou and ends in Zhujiajian Sub-district of Zhoushan with a current length of 292 km (181 mi), is the only national highway serving the city of Zhoushan. It is also the shortest national level highway that runs in the east–west direction. Before reaching Zhoushan, Highway 329 passes through municipalities of Shaoxing and Ningbo. The route between the boundaries of Ningbo and Zhoushan is built in the form of ferry, which is also unique in the national highway system. The ferry dock on Ningbo's side is named Baifeng, and the one on Zhoushan's side is named Yadanshan. The route of Highway 329 in Zhoushan has undergone several changes and adjustments. Initially the route went through the southern shoreline of Zhoushan Island and ended in Shenjiamen. However, with the construction of Zhujiajian Bridge, the route was extended all the way to Nansha Beach of Zhujiajian Island. Later, with the development Dinghai and Lincheng, part of Highway 329 was designated as urban roads instead of a rapid passing corridor. Therefore, Highway 329 went on to take the route of the outer ring road of Dinghai and Highway Baiquan-Shenjiamen. Recently to optimize the highway structure of Zhoushan, Highway 329 is undergoing another large modification in its route. The new route, designed with a series of tunnels and interchanges, will run at the center of Zhoushan Island to form its backbone. Seven tunnels on the new route account for a length of 11,187 meters (36,703 ft). A total of 5 interchanges are designed along the new route. The project, projected to spend 5 billion yuan, is set to finish in 2015.
- Zhoushan bus rapid transit (舟山快速公交) is the rapid transit system with dedicated lanes between urban agglomerations on Zhoushan Island. Line One, designed with a route of 25 km (16 mi), started to operate since 1 October 2013 connecting Dinghai and Donggang, Putuo. A total of 10 BRT stops are set on Line One: Dinghai Dongmen (定海东门总站), Dinghai Tanfeng (定海檀枫), Dinghai Chengdong (定海城东), Xincheng Nanhai (新城南海), Xincheng Central (新城总站), Xincheng Zhoushan Hospital (新城舟山医院), Xincheng Fulidao Road (新城富丽岛路), Putuo Puxi (普陀浦西), Putuo Chengbei (普陀城北总站), and Putuo Donggang Gymnasium (普陀东港体育馆). The service time for Line One starts at 6:30 and ends at 20:00 with a frequency of approximately 120 daily. The standard fare is 2 yuan regardless of stops traveled. Passengers with public transit IC cards are eligible for a 20 percentage discount per trip. Passengers can transfer to normal public transit buses once for free within one hour of initial aboard time. All buses are covered with 4G wireless signal. Other lines are being planned and will be constructed in the near future.

=== Rail ===
- The under construction Ningbo–Zhoushan railway will start from Ningbo Station and end in Zhoushan Baiquan Station, with a total length of 80.8 kilometers (50.2 mi). The line is planned to include 9 stations. The section between Ningbo East Station and Jintang Station runs passenger and freight trains, while the section between Jintang Station and Baiquan Station is a dedicated line for passengers.

=== Water transportation ===
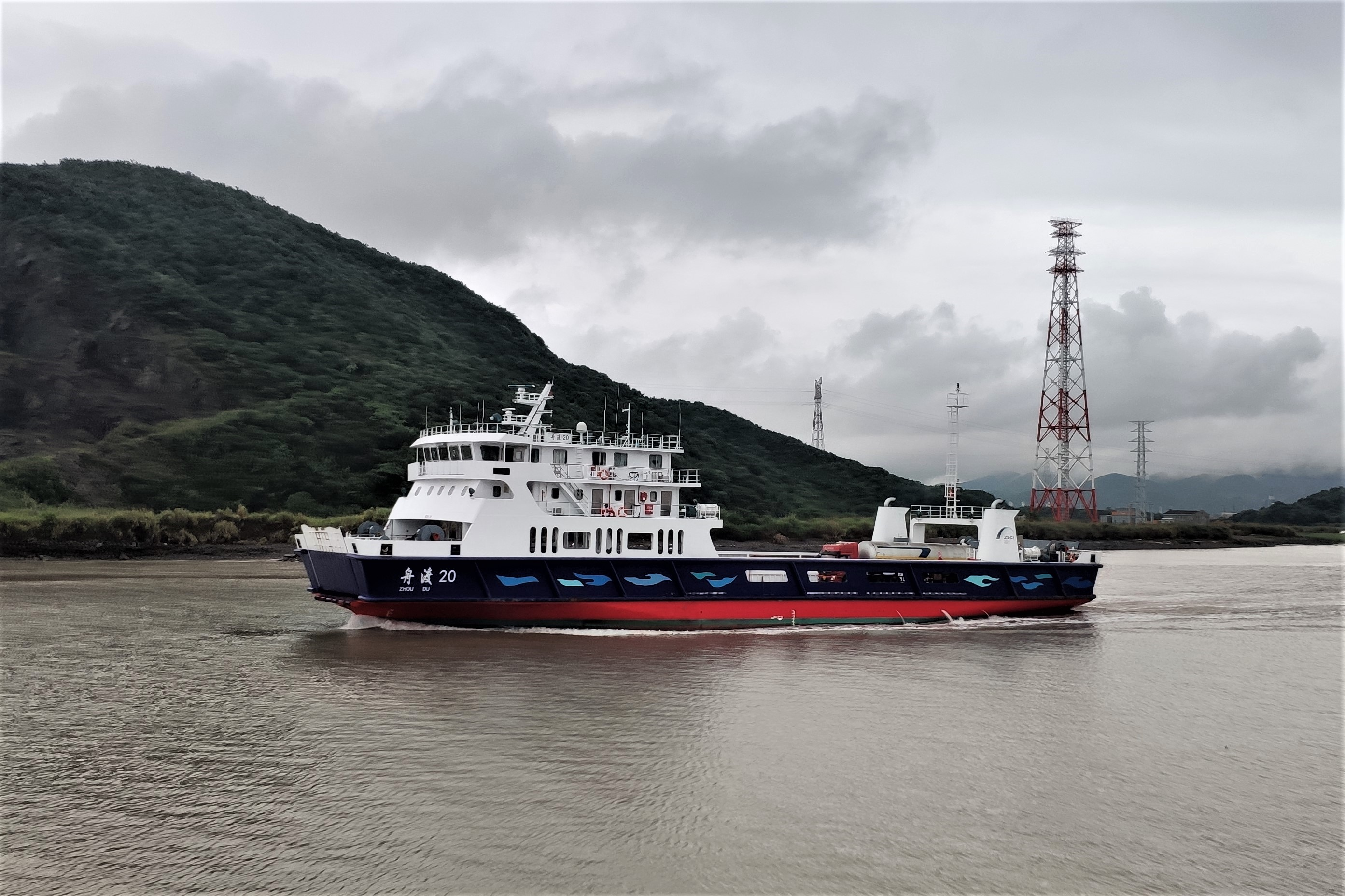
Ferryboat between Zhoushan and Ningbo

- Two major ferry routes with high frequency (intervals vary from fifteen minutes to an hour) connect Zhoushan Main Island to Shanghai to the north and Ningbo to the south. Besides, there are scheduled ships traveling between Zhoushan and other ports such as Wenzhou and Fuzhou. Major inhabited islands within the municipality are served by smaller scale ferries and speedboat fleets. Frequencies depend on levels of population.

== Energy ==
There exist 2 power connections: HVDC Zhoushan, the first HVDC built in China and Zhoushan Island Overhead Powerline Tie with the tallest electricity pylons in the world, as well as the world's longest span.

== Tourism ==
Zhoushan has two national-level scenic areas, Mount Putuo and the Shengsi Islands, and two provincial-level scenic areas, Taohua Island and Daishan. Its connection to the continental part of the Yangtze Delta has supported tourism in the area. In 2021, Zhoushan received 27.71 million visitors (25 times the population), including 310,500 from outside China. The tourism industry is an important sector of the local economy; it generated 26.68 billion yuan in 2012.

=== Mount Putuo National Scenic Area ===
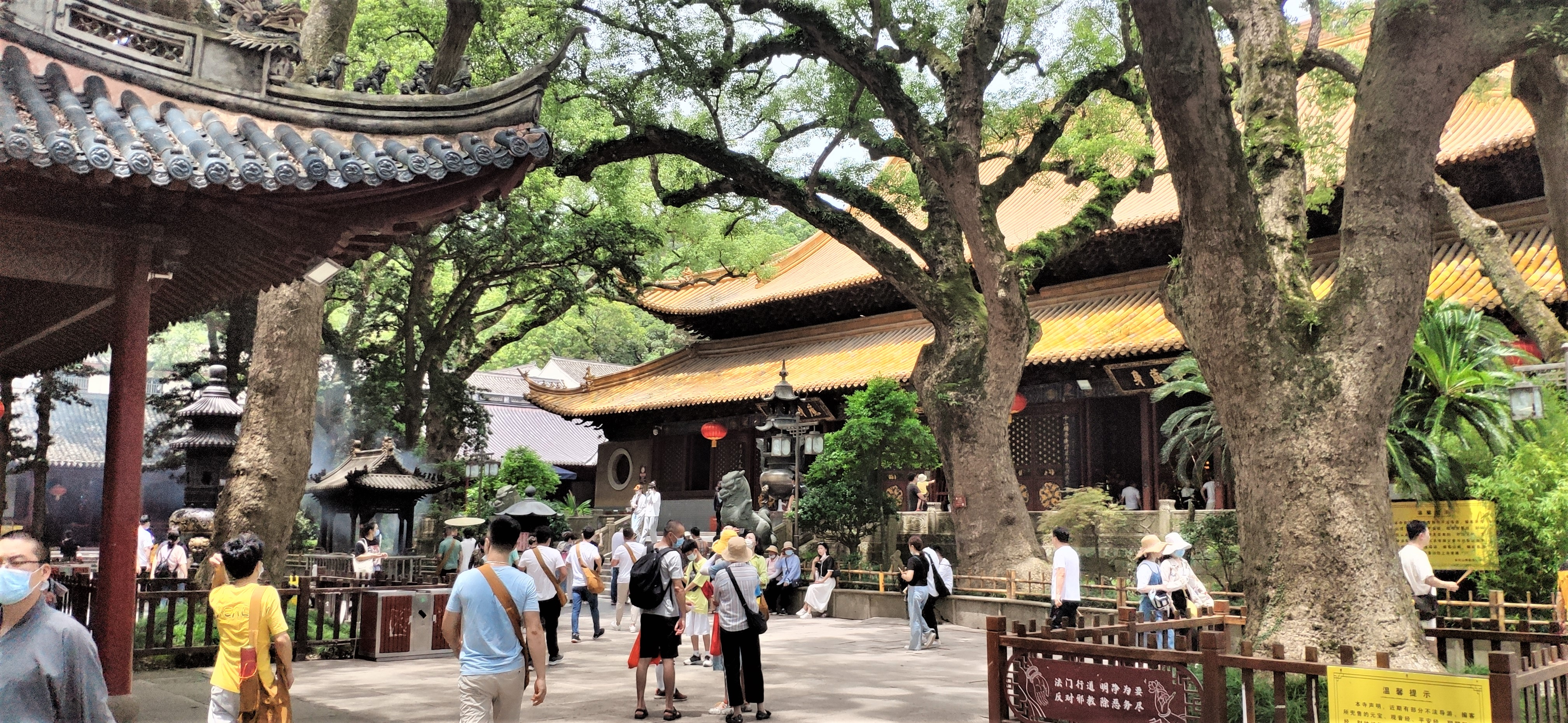
Puji Temple is the main temple of Mount Putuo

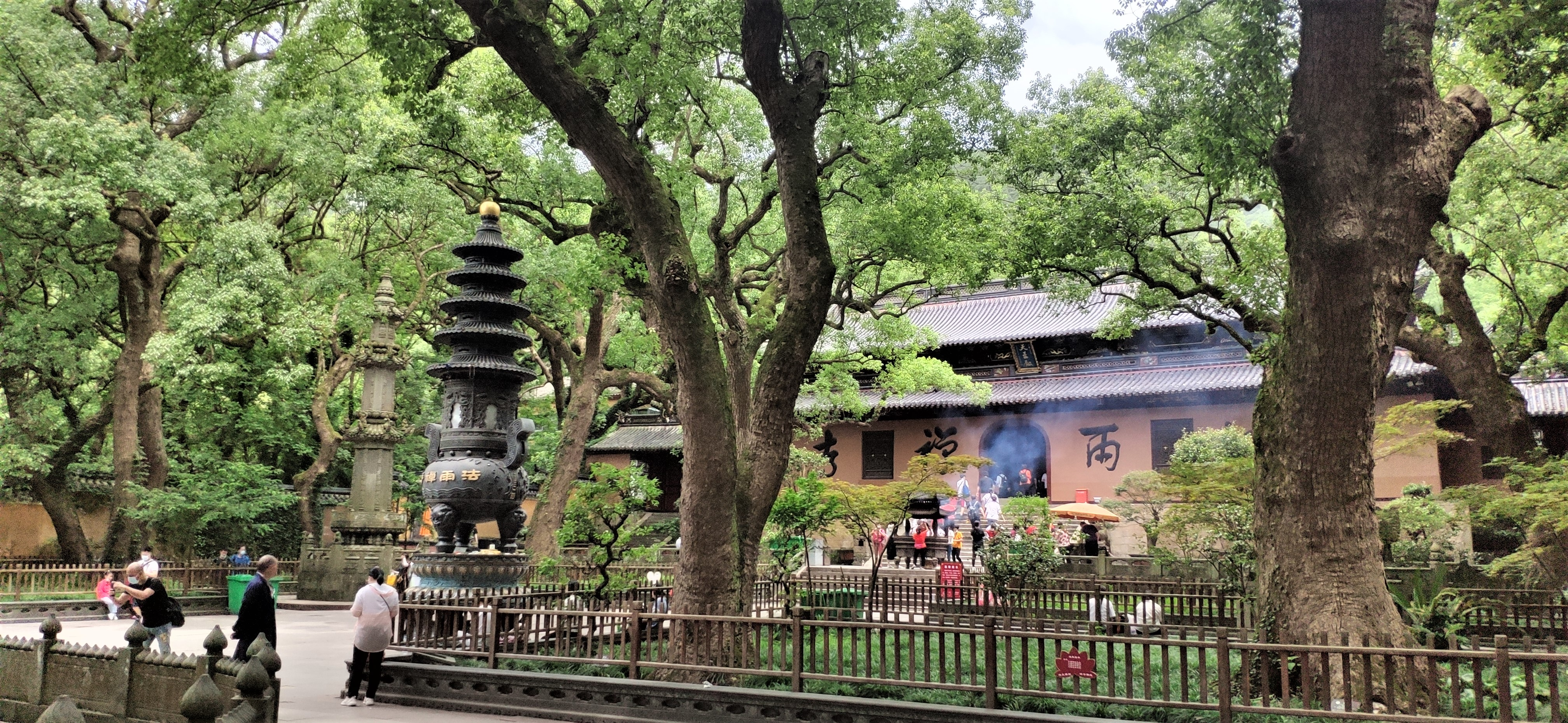
Fayu Temple is the second largest temple on Mount Putuo

Mount Putuo National Scenic Area (普陀山国家级重点风景名胜区) comprises two parts: Mount Putuo and Zhujiajian Eastern Coast. The scenic area has a total area of 41.85 square kilometers (16.16 sq mi).

On a visit in the early 1830s, missionary Karl Gützlaff noted that the island of "Poo-to" boasted two large and 60 small temples, attended by 2,000 monks,

To every person who visits this island, it appears at first like a fairy land, so romantic is everything which meets the eye. Those large inscriptions hewn in solid granite, the many temples which appear in every direction, the highly picturesque scenery itself, with its many-peaked, riven, and detached rocks, and above all a stately mausoleum, the largest which I have ever seen, containing the bones and ashes of thousands of priests, quite bewilder the imagination.

Mount Putuo (普陀山), also named Mount Meicen (梅岑山) and Mount Baihua (白华山), is considered the bodhimanda of Avalokitesvara (Guanyin), a revered Bodhisattva in many parts of East Asia. It is one of the four sacred mountains in Chinese Buddhism, the others being Mount Wutai, Mount Jiuhua, and Mount Emei. However, different from other three sacred mountains which are mountains with heights of more than 1,000 meters (3,300 ft), Mount Putuo is actually a small island with a total area of 12.5 km^{2} (4.8 sq mi), the highest point of which is Peak Foding (291.3 m or 956 ft above sea level). Mount Putuo features three grand temples (Puji Temple, Fayu Temple, and Huiji Temple), three treasures (Tahoto Pagoda, Yangzhi Guanyin Stele, and Nine-Dragon Caisson), three rocks (Rock Pantuo, Heart Rock, and Rock Ergui Tingfa), three caves (Cave Chaoyang, Cave Chaoyin and Cave Fanyin), 88 nunneries and 128 huts, and twelve scenes. Mount Putuo was praised in various historic records. It is often titled as Bulguksa Among Seas and Skies (海天佛国), or Sacred Ground on the Southern Seas (南海圣境). Mount Putuo is always mentioned in the same breath with the West Lake in Hangzhou, another national scenic area of Zhejiang. West Lake is considered to be the foremost place that combines mountain and lake views, whereas Mount Putuo is deemed as the top place where integrates mountain and sea views (以山而兼湖之胜，则推西湖；以山而兼海之胜，当推普陀).

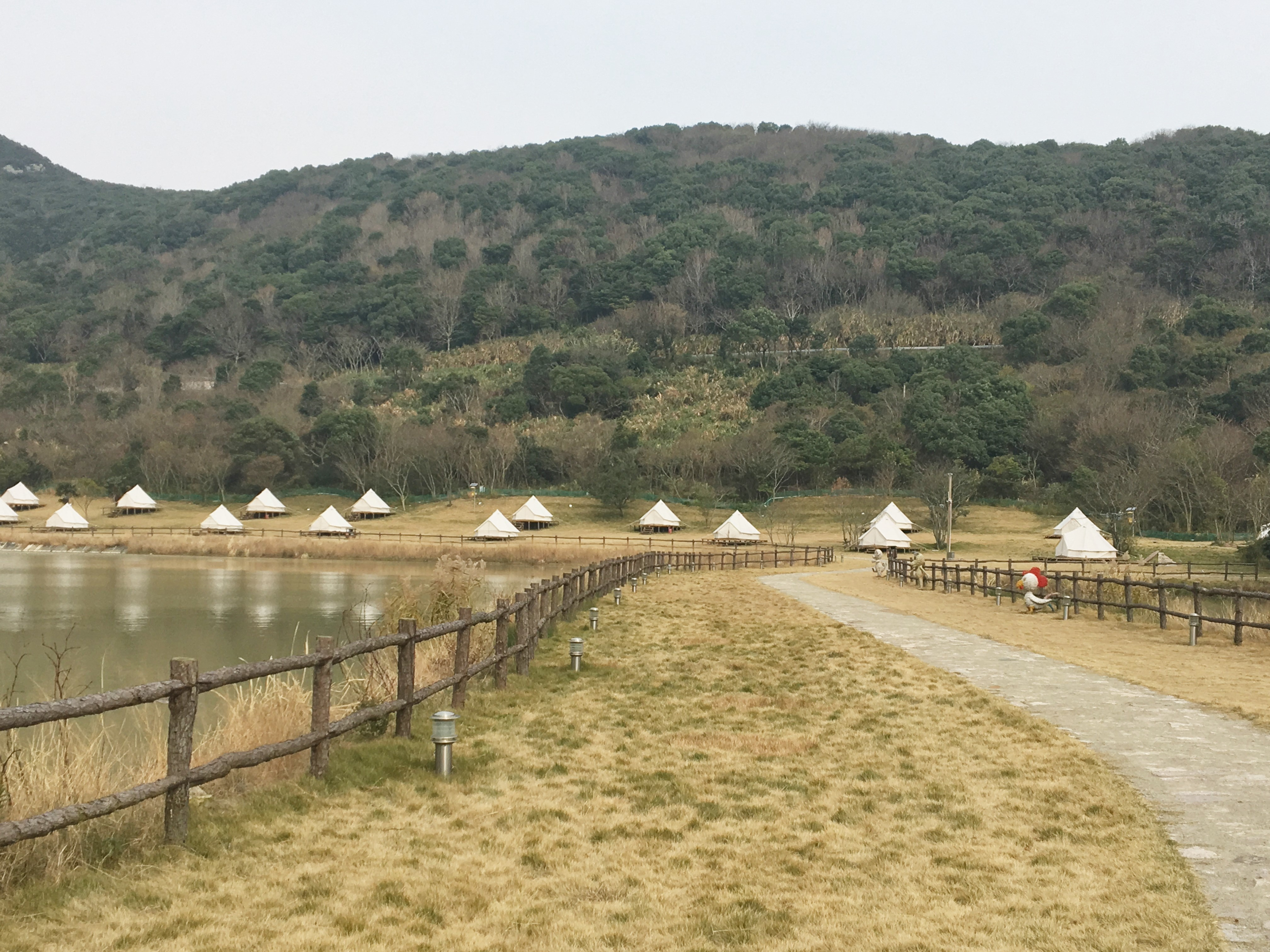
Daqingshan scenic spot in Zhujiajian

Zhujiajian (朱家尖) is the fifth largest island of the archipelago and a newly developed seaside resort with intriguing seascapes, unmarred beaches, dense woods, sheer rock cliffs, hills for hiking, extraordinary seafood and displays of fishermen folk culture. It is home to the Zhoushan International Sand Sculpture Festival, which is held on the Nansha Beach, one of the five consecutive beaches, at the turn of summer and autumn every year. Daqing Mountain is the best location to get the incomparable view of southern Zhoushan Islands and the continental China (Chuanshan Peninsula) on clear days. It is also an ideal place for extreme sports, such as car racing, mountain cycling, gliding, rock climbing and bungee jumping. Baishan Mountain features huge natural rocks of different shapes, Guanyin carving on the cliff, and the Putuo Impression show, directed by Zhang Yimou. Zhujiajian is also the site for Mount Putuo Buddhist Academy. Wushitang (Dark Stone Beach) is the 500-meter (1,600 ft) beach consisting of numerous dark colored pebbles.

=== Shengsi Islands National Scenic Area ===
Shengsi Islands National Scenic Area (嵊泗列岛国家级重点风景名胜区) is the only national level scenic area in China that is established on a group of natural islands. The scenic area, consisting of hundreds of islands outlying the Hangzhou Bay, boasts multiple quality beaches, rocks, and cliffs. Although it is commonly endowed with natural seascape beauty, each island is unique. Jihu and Nanchangtu Twin Beaches, the northernmost sand beaches of Southern China (and the natural beaches closest to Shanghai), make Sijiao Island a popular tourism destination. Shengshan is one of the most important fishing ports on the East China Sea. The eastern coast of Shengshan Island features steep cliffs, an ideal place to view sunrise above the sea. On the north coast is the abandoned fishing village of Houtouwan, now overgrown with vegetation. Gouqi Island has well-preserved fishing villages and cultures, the largest aquatic farm in China and the Mountain and Sea Wonders (山海奇观) rock that was believed to be left by General Hou Jigao of the Ming dynasty, who defended the southeastern coast against the raids from wokou. Huaniao Island features the Huaniao Lighthouse, initially built in 1870 with the reputation of the first lighthouse of the Far East (远东第一灯塔), that stands on the busiest shipping route in China entering and leaving Shanghai and the Yangtze River. The lighthouse has been on the National Major Historical and Cultural Sites list under protection since 2001.

=== Taohua Island Provincial Level Scenic Area ===
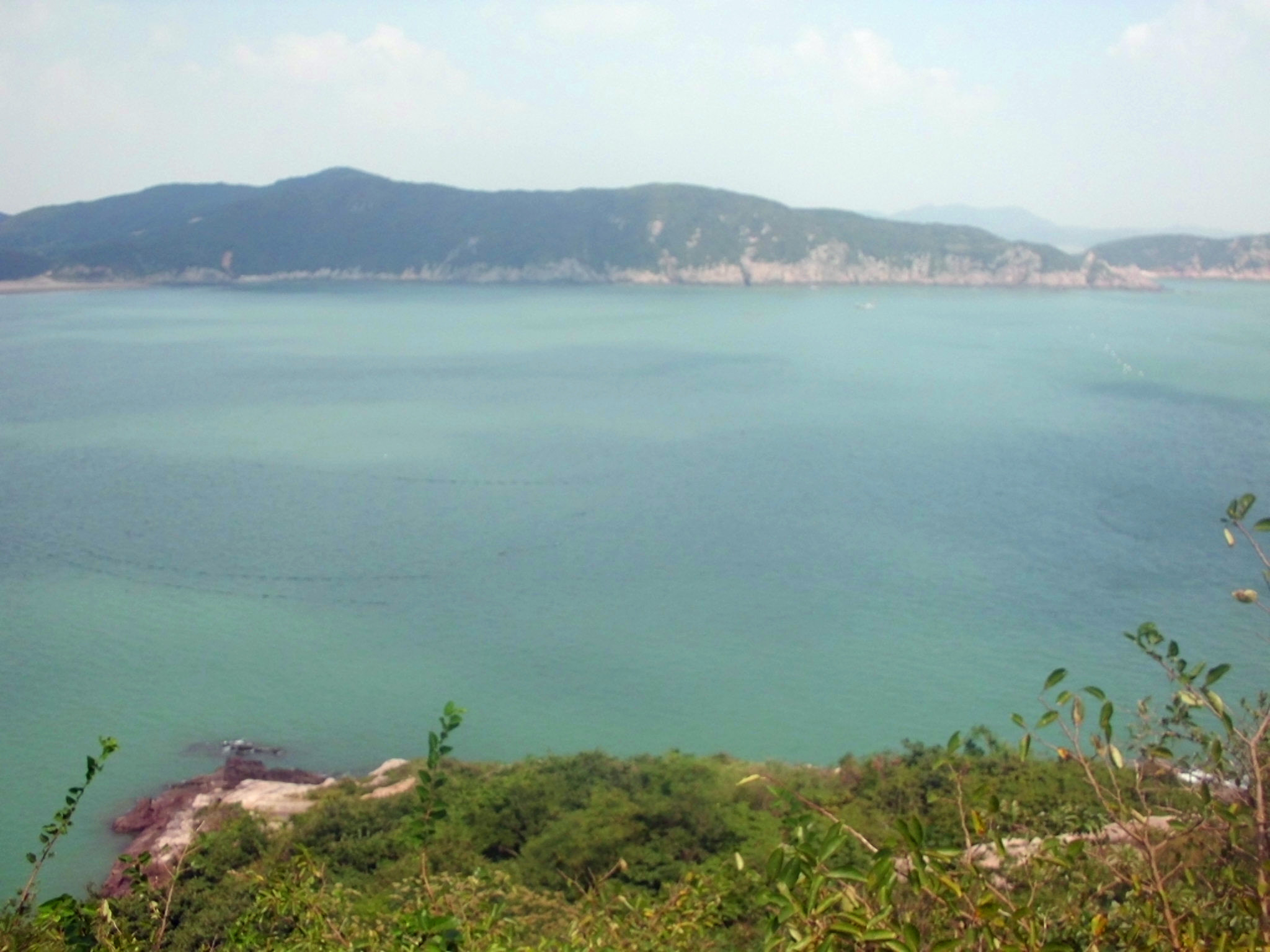
Taohua Island

Taohua Island is the most botanically diversified island in Zhejiang's coastal area, with nearly 600 species of trees and plants, including oranges, orchids and narcissus – and now peach trees. It is also a popular site for shooting movies and TV series based on Jin Yong's novels. Four Chinese TV serials – "The Eagle-Shooting Heroes," "Demi-Gods and Semi-Devils," "The Return of the Condor Heroes" and "Duke of Mount Deer" – were filmed on the island. Starting from 2004, the Jin Yong Martial Arts (Wuxia) Culture Festival is held here every other year around summer. It offers dazzling martial arts performances and competitions for Cha's fans.

=== Daishan Provincial Level Scenic Area ===
Daishan (岱山), originally known as Penglai, is believed to have been reached by Xu Fu of the Qin dynasty during his eastward journey to Japan. Mount Moxin, with a height of 257 meters (843 ft) above sea level, is the highest peak on Daishan Island, from where visitors can get the fantastic view of Gaoting, the county seat, and nearby islands and water channels. Ciyun Temple is the major temple on Mount Moxin and a popular scenic spot. Lulan-qingsha Beach, measuring 3,600 meters (11,800 ft) long and 500 meters (1,600 ft) wide, is the single longest beach of Eastern China. It is an ideal place for camping, flying kites, and movie-shooting. The beach is also the location for yearly worship services or matsuris of the ocean for fishing harvest. Dongsha Ancient Town was once the county seat of Daishan, with hundreds years of commercial and exchange activities associated to traditional fishing industry. Several major buildings and facilities have been well protected. Shuanghe features wonderful large-scale man-made cliffs and precipices which are the result of hundreds years of carving for granite materials for architectural purposes. Daishan has the reputation of being a county of museums. Its collection of museums include themes such as fishing culture, Zhoushan dialect, typhoon, lighthouse, salt production, etc. Besides the above-stated attractions on Daishan Island, other islands are noteworthy as well. For example, Xiushan Island features the only inter-tidal mud theme park in China. Qushan Island features Mount Guanyin, which is also a bodhimanda of Guanyin. Changtu is a traditional fishing port.

== Other attractions ==
- Dongji Islands (东极岛), formerly known as Zhongjieshan Chain of Islands (中街山列岛), is a group of islands located at the eastmost end of the Zhoushan Archipelago, extending far into the East China Sea. It is famous for well-preserved original fishing villages, and unpolluted natural seascapes.
- Shenjiamen Fishing Port (沈家门渔港) is the traditional center of Zhoushan Fishery and the largest fishing port of China. Its seafront promenade of open-air seafood restaurants is widely appreciated for fresh seafood served, wonderful views of the port and plenty of strolling musicians.
- Opium War Memorial (Zhushan Park) (鸦片战争遗址公园(竹山公园)) is an urban park at the southwestern corner of Dinghai county town in memory of the battle fought between Zhoushaners and the British around 1840, notably the heroic deeds of three generals, Ge Yunfei, Wang Xipeng and Zheng Guohong.

== Notable people ==
=== Arts ===
- He Wei (何爲; 1922–2011), writer
- Sanmao (三毛; 1943–1991), Taiwanese writer
- Wong Kar-wai (王家衛; born 1958), Hong Kong filmmaker
- Michael Miu (苗僑偉; born 1958), Hong Kong TVB actor
- Wu Shanzhuan (吳山專; born 1960), artist
- He Saifei (何賽飛; born 1964), actress
- Sandy Lam (林憶蓮; born 1966), Hong Kong singer

=== Politics ===
- K. H. Ting (丁光训; 1915–2012), vice-chairman of the 10th CPPCC National Committee, chairman of the China Amity Foundation
- Qiao Shi (乔石; 1924–2015), former chairman of People's Congress of the People's Republic of China
- Tung Chee Hwa (董建華; born 1937), the first elected Chief Executive of the Hong Kong Special Administrative Region
- Chai Songyue (柴松岳; born 1941), former governor of Zhejiang Province (1997–2002)
- Carrie Lam Cheng Yuet-ngor (林鄭月娥; born 1957), the fifth elected Chief Executive of the Hong Kong Special Administrative Region

=== Entrepreneurs ===
- Tung Chao Yung (董浩雲; 1912–1982), shipping tycoon and founder of several major shipping companies
- Yang Yuanqing (杨元庆; born 1964), chief executive officer of Lenovo
- Jin Zhuanglong (金壮龙; born 1964), chairman of Commercial Aircraft Corporation of China Ltd

=== Others ===
- Xu Jingbo (徐靜波; born 1963), journalist and founder of Asian News Agency
- Ji Xiaohua (嵇晓华; born 1977), founder of popular science website guokr.com

== Education ==
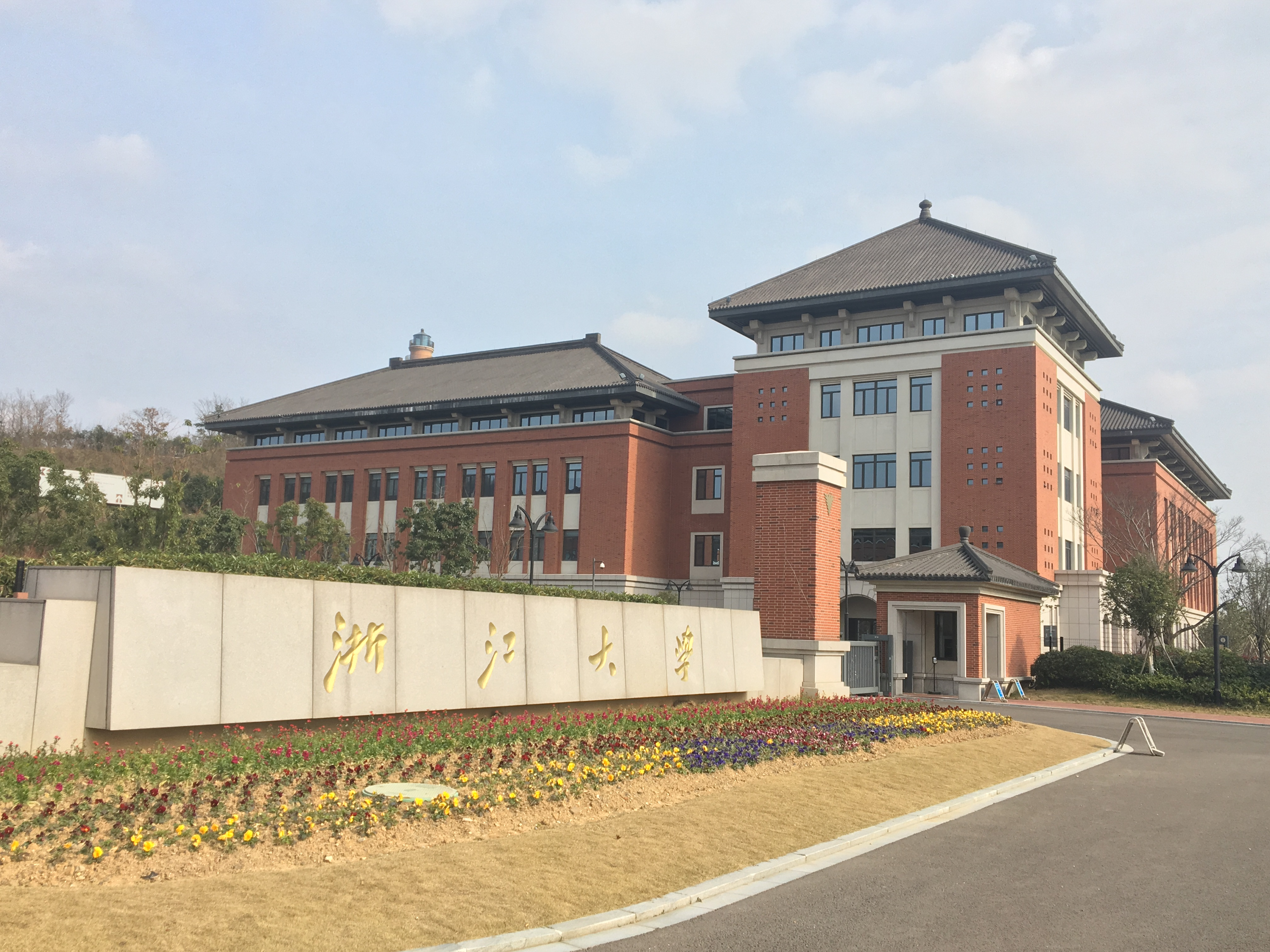
Zhejiang University Zhoushan Campus

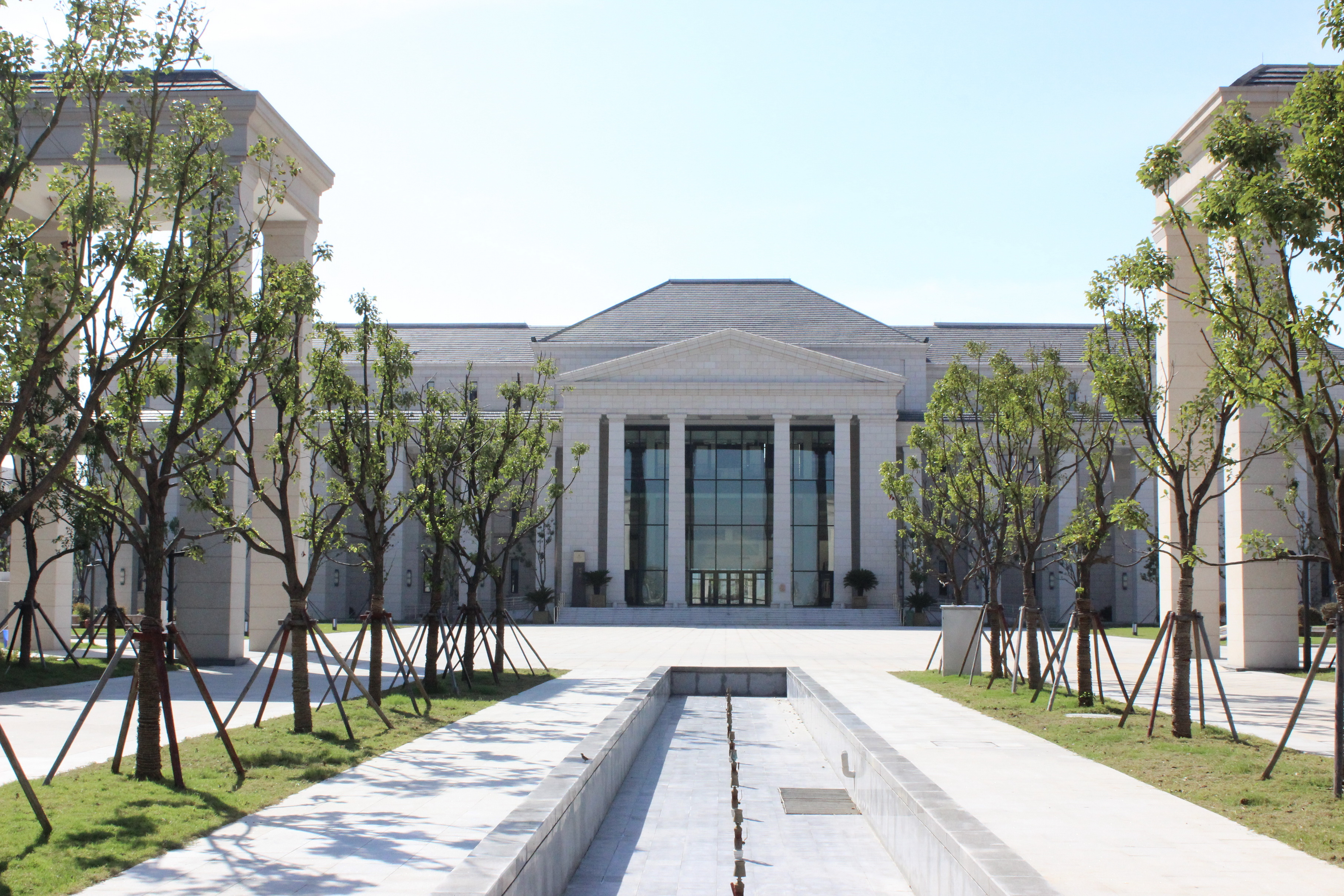
Zhejiang Ocean University Changzhi Island Campus, is one of the three major campuses of the university (the other two being Dinghai Campus and Xiaoshan Campus)

Zhoushan City has 111 licensed kindergartens, 62 primary schools, 34 middle schools, 16 high schools, 7 vocational schools, and 3 higher-educational level colleges and universities. Zhoushan High School, Dinghai First High School, Putuo High School, Daishan High School, and Shengsi High School are province level key public high schools. Putuo No.2 Middle School is one of the noted secondary schools in the Putuo District. Nanhai Experimental School, located at Lincheng Sub-District of Dinghai and established in 2001, is a major private school. Zhejiang Ocean University and Zhejiang University (Zhoushan Campus) are two well-known universities in the city.

== Twin towns – sister cities ==
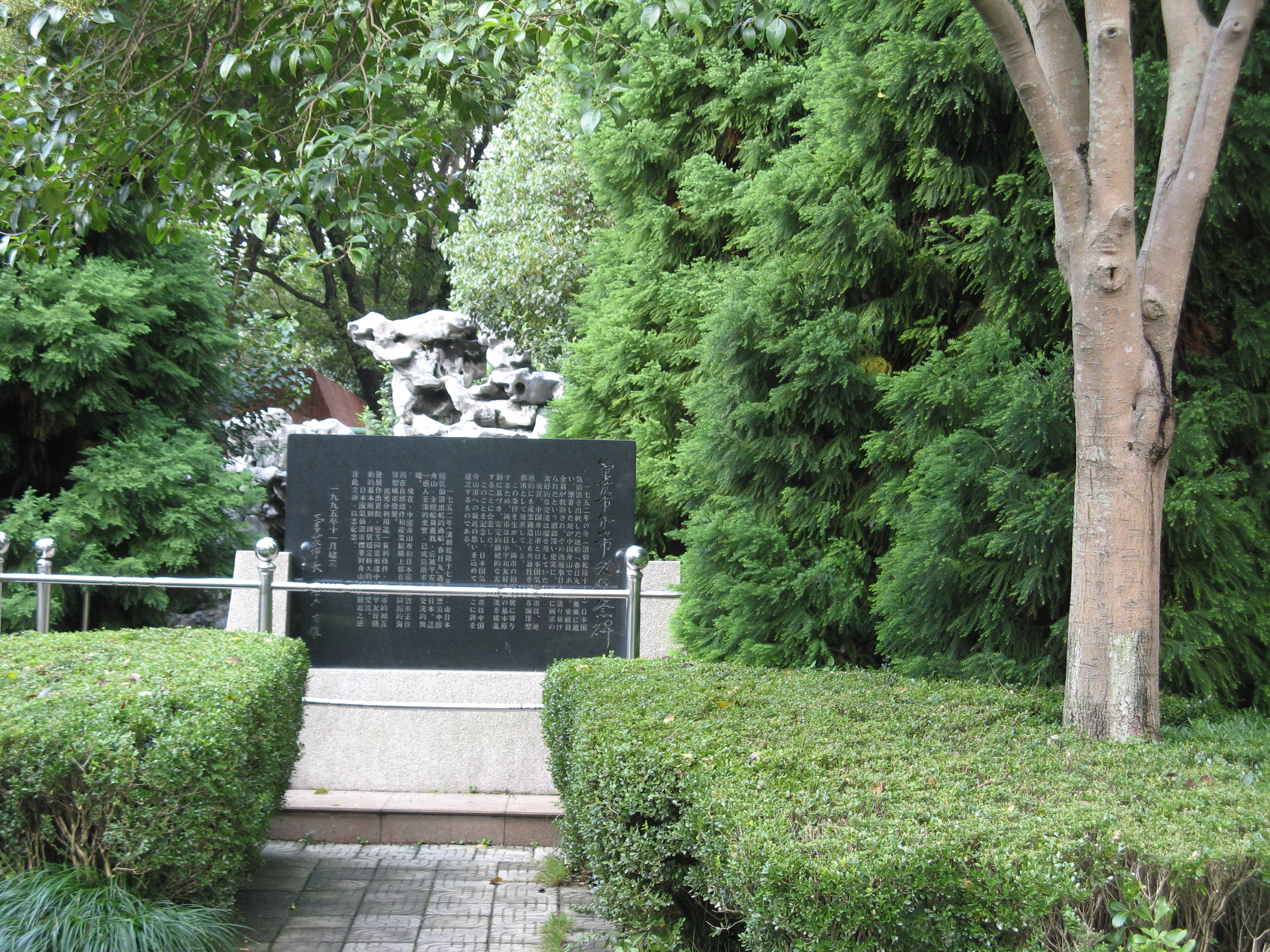
A stele in Dinghai Park of Zhoushan commemorating the friendship between Zhoushan and Kesennuma, Japan.

- City of Greater Geraldton, Western Australia, Australia
- (China) Cangzhou, Hebei
- Richmond, California, United States
- La Spezia, Province of La Spezia, Italy
- Szekszárd, Tolna County, Hungary
- Tinos, Cyclades, Greece
- Lefkada, Ionian Islands, Greece
- Kesennuma, Miyagi, Japan
- Ganghwa County, Incheon Metropolitan City, South Korea
- Gokseong County, South Jeolla Province, South Korea
- Sacheon City, South Gyeongsang Province, South Korea
- Imus, Cavite, Philippines
- Zamboanga City, Philippines

== See also ==
- List of islands of China
- East Sea Fleet
