= Daishan County =

Daishan 岱山县
- County
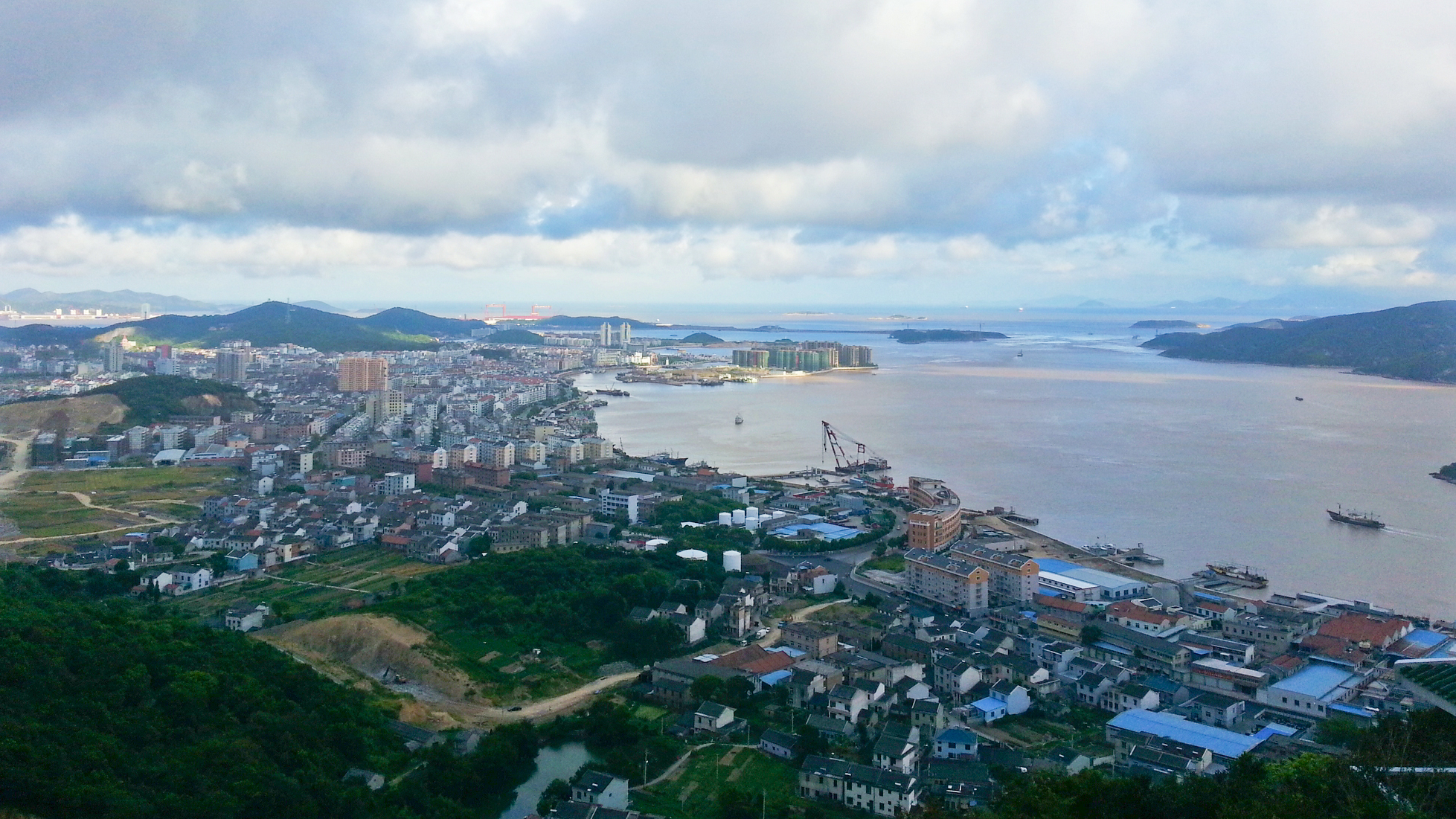

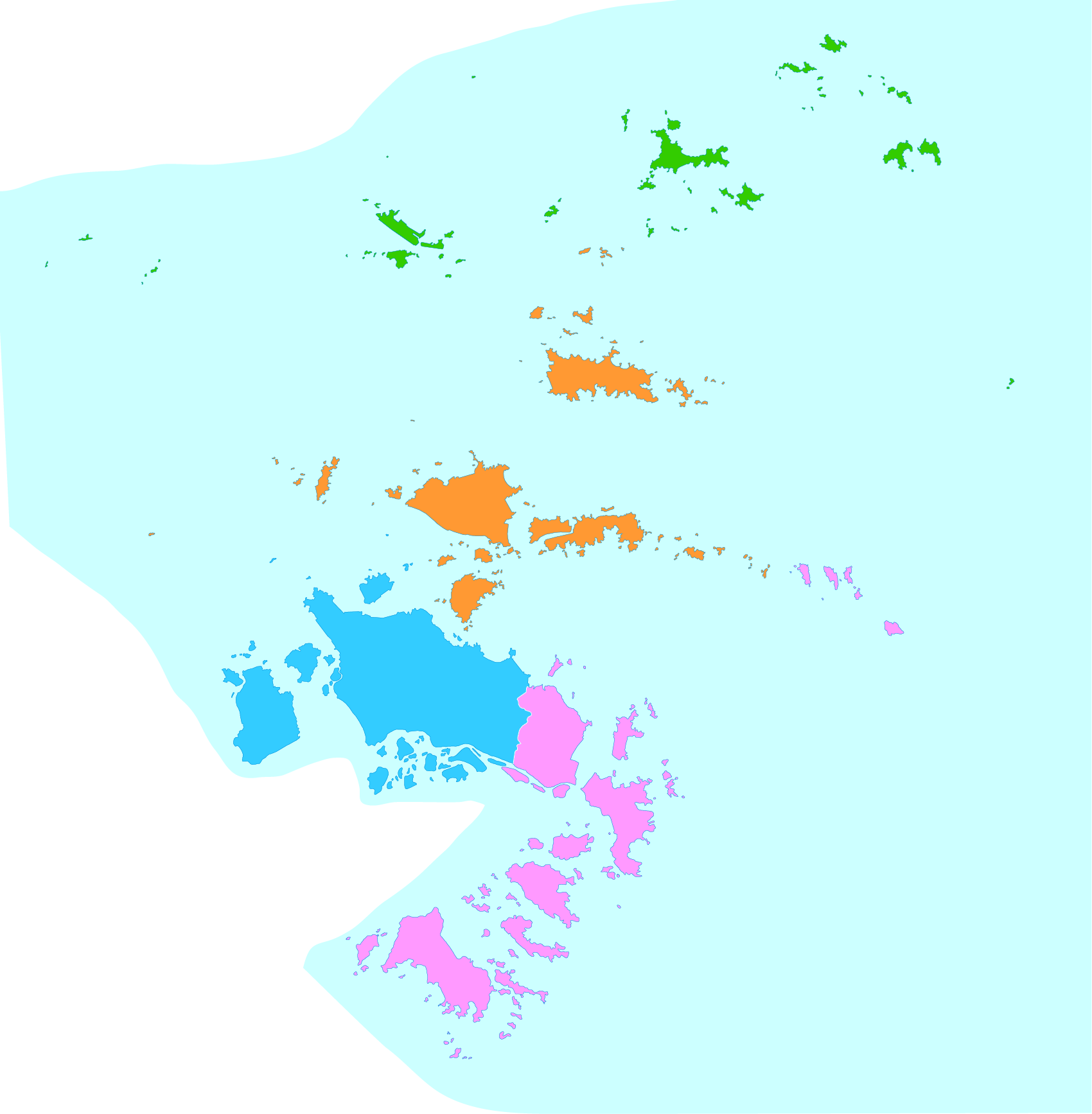
- Daishan County is in orange here on the map.

- Location in Zhejiang
- Coordinates: 30.2603°N 122.204°E
- Country: People's Republic of China
- Province: Zhejiang
- Prefecture-level city: Zhoushan

Area
  - Total: 324.13 km^{2} (125.15 sq mi)

Population (2018)
  - Total: 212,100
  - Density: 654.4/km^{2} (1,695/sq mi)
- Time zone: UTC+8 (China Standard)
- Postal code: 316200
- Area code: 580
- Website: www.daishan.gov.cn

Daishan
- Chinese: 岱山
- Postal: Taishan
Transcriptions
Standard Mandarin
- Hanyu Pinyin: Dàishān
- Wade–Giles: Tai^{4}-shan^{1}

Daishan (Chinese: 岱山; pinyin: Dàishān,) is an archipelago and county under the jurisdiction of Zhoushan, Zhejiang Province. It covers a land area of 324.13 square kilometres (125 square miles) and has a population of 200,000. The postal code is 316200, and the county seat is located on 88 Renmin Road, Gaoting Town.

The county is located in East China Sea in northeast Zhejiang. It comprises a series of islands with Daishan Island forming the main part of the county. Daishan Island has a fishing port, and shipbuilding and ship refitting facilities. The island has several museums including salt, marine life, typhoon and lighthouse museums.

== Administrative divisions ==
The county consists of six towns and one township.

Towns

- Gaoting (高亭镇)
- Qushan (衢山镇)
- Dongsha (东沙镇)
- Daixi (岱西镇)
- Changtu (长涂镇)
- Daidong (岱东镇)

Townships

- Xiushan (秀山乡)

== Governance ==
=== Daishan County Public Security Bureau ===
The primary law enforcement agency in Daishan County is the Daishan County Public Security Bureau (Chinese: 岱山县公安局). The incumbent chief of the Daishan County Public Security Bureau is Miao Lin, and the incumbent political commissar is Luo Haiting. As of 2024, the agency operated 65 vehicles, 54 of which were patrol cars and 11 of which were specialist vehicles. The agency budget in 2024 was 15.7 million yuan, a 0.2% increase over 15.4 million yuan in 2023.

==== Organization and Structure ====
The Daishan County PSB operates 7 police stations (in each town), 1 jail and 1 Detention Center. It is also contains a forestry team, a marine police/anti-smuggling team, an armory/logistics office, a traffic police unit, a narcotics unit, a patrol unit, a forensics unit, an investigation unit, a SWAT/K9 unit, an economic crime unit and an Intelligence unit (which is in charge of the county dispatcher).

=== People's Armed Police Daishan County Company ===
The People's Armed Police Daishan County Company (中国人民武装警察部隊岱山县中队) of the People's Armed Police Zhoushan Detachment provides paramilitary law enforcement and disaster relief in the county.

=== Daishan County Fire and Rescue Battalion ===
Fire services in the county are provided by the Daishan County Fire and Rescue Battalion (岱山县消防救援大队). As of December 31, 2023, the County Fire and Rescue Battalion had 38 civilian employees and 56 firefighters. In 2023, the agency had a budget of 17.6 million yuan, a 24.9% increase from 14.3 million yuan in 2022. As of December 31, 2023, the agency operated 16 vehicles, 3 of which were fire engines and 13 of which were specialist vehicles.

== National priority protected sites ==
There is one national priority protected site in Daishan County.

- Eastern Zhejiang Lighthouses, added to list in 2013 as part of the 7th Batch of National priority protected sites
  - Yuxingnao Island Lighthouse
  - Xiaoguishan Lighthouse

== Climate ==
Climate data for Daishan, elevation 37 m (121 ft), (1991–2020 normals, extremes 1981–present)
Month	Jan	Feb	Mar	Apr	May	Jun	Jul	Aug	Sep	Oct	Nov	Dec	Year
Record high °C (°F)	23.1 (73.6)	25.6 (78.1)	27.5 (81.5)	28.3 (82.9)	31.0 (87.8)	36.2 (97.2)	37.6 (99.7)	36.5 (97.7)	33.3 (91.9)	34.3 (93.7)	27.0 (80.6)	21.8 (71.2)	37.6 (99.7)
Mean daily maximum °C (°F)	9.0 (48.2)	10.1 (50.2)	13.7 (56.7)	18.6 (65.5)	22.9 (73.2)	26.2 (79.2)	31.0 (87.8)	31.2 (88.2)	27.6 (81.7)	23.2 (73.8)	18.1 (64.6)	11.9 (53.4)	20.3 (68.5)
Daily mean °C (°F)	6.5 (43.7)	7.3 (45.1)	10.5 (50.9)	15.0 (59.0)	19.7 (67.5)	23.3 (73.9)	27.5 (81.5)	28.0 (82.4)	25.0 (77.0)	20.6 (69.1)	15.5 (59.9)	9.3 (48.7)	17.4 (63.2)
Mean daily minimum °C (°F)	4.6 (40.3)	5.2 (41.4)	8.0 (46.4)	12.4 (54.3)	17.2 (63.0)	21.2 (70.2)	25.1 (77.2)	25.8 (78.4)	23.0 (73.4)	18.6 (65.5)	13.4 (56.1)	7.2 (45.0)	15.1 (59.3)
Record low °C (°F)	−5.6 (21.9)	−2.7 (27.1)	−1.3 (29.7)	5.1 (41.2)	8.7 (47.7)	12.6 (54.7)	18.2 (64.8)	20.3 (68.5)	15.6 (60.1)	8.0 (46.4)	4.1 (39.4)	−3.0 (26.6)	−5.6 (21.9)
Average precipitation mm (inches)	69.5 (2.74)	79.0 (3.11)	103.5 (4.07)	93.3 (3.67)	108.7 (4.28)	201.0 (7.91)	100.6 (3.96)	131.3 (5.17)	134.5 (5.30)	94.5 (3.72)	81.7 (3.22)	77.4 (3.05)	1,275 (50.2)
Average precipitation days (≥ 0.1 mm)	12.0	12.0	12.9	12.7	13.1	15.6	9.1	10.4	11.0	7.9	11.1	10.7	138.5
Average snowy days	1.8	1.9	0.4	0.1	0	0	0	0	0	0	0	1.0	5.2
Average relative humidity (%)	75	78	77	79	83	88	84	83	79	73	73	71	79
Mean monthly sunshine hours	105.7	99.8	147.0	163.0	167.1	130.0	246.3	242.2	174.4	169.6	121.3	123.0	1,889.4
Percentage possible sunshine	33	32	39	42	39	31	58	60	47	48	38	39	42
Source: China Meteorological Administration All-time Oct extreme

== See also ==
- Chinese hospital ship Daishan Dao
