= Wang Yijun =

Leader of Taiping rebels

- Simplified Chinese: 王义钧
Transcriptions

Wang Yijun was a leader of the Taiping rebels in 19th-century China. He was killed in an unsuccessful attempt to retake Zhoushan Island from its Qing garrison on 13 February 1862.
