= G3 Beijing–Taipei Expressway =

Expressway in China

Beijing–Taipei Expressway
- 北京－台北高速公路
- Jingtai Expressway 京台高速

Route information
- Length: 2,030 km (1,260 mi)

Major junctions
- North end: Liujiayao Bridge, 3rd Ring Road, Beijing
- South end: G15 in Minhou County, Fuzhou, Fujian (current); Nat 1 in Taipei, Taiwan (hypothetical)

Location
- Country: China

Highway system
- National Trunk Highway System; Primary; Auxiliary; National Highways; Transport in China
← G0212	→ G0311

The Beijing–Taipei Expressway (Chinese: 北京–台北高速公路; pinyin: Běijīng–Táiběi Gāosù Gōnglù), designated as G3 and commonly known as the Jingtai Expressway (Chinese: 京台高速公路; pinyin: Jīngtái Gāosù Gōnglù), is a partially completed Chinese expressway that, if fully constructed, would connect the People's Republic of China with Taiwan. Currently, the expressway is complete from Beijing to Fuzhou, Fujian, and is fully complete in Mainland China except for a small section in Fujian which is under construction.

In Taiwan, the expressway was proposed to connect with a hypothetical G99 Taiwan Ring Expressway in Taipei, which would supposedly encircle the island of Taiwan, as proposed by the People's Republic of China. In its western half, the G99 Expressway's proposed route coincided with that of National Freeway 1 under the ROC highway system. The proposal for the G99 Expressway was shelved in 2017, and its cancellation was reaffirmed during the July 2022 expansion.

The project has been the source of some controversy because of Taiwan's political status. The People's Republic of China claims Taiwan, but has never administered it, so therefore does not have any control of its highways. As Taiwan does not recognize the highway designation by the People's Republic of China and has its own highway system, the Taiwan portion of the expressway has not been constructed. Aside from politics, the other challenge is the engineering difficulties in constructing the link through the Taiwan Strait. A bridge seems less likely than an undersea tunnel, which would have to exceed 100 kilometres in length. This is further complicated given the climatic and weather conditions across the straits.

In China, it connects the cities of Beijing, Langfang, Cangzhou, Dezhou, Jinan, Tai'an, Xuzhou, Bengbu, Hefei, Tongling, Huangshan, Quzhou, and Fuzhou.

China Expwy G3 sign with name

China Expwy G3 sign terminal

China Expwy G3 sign no name

== Route ==
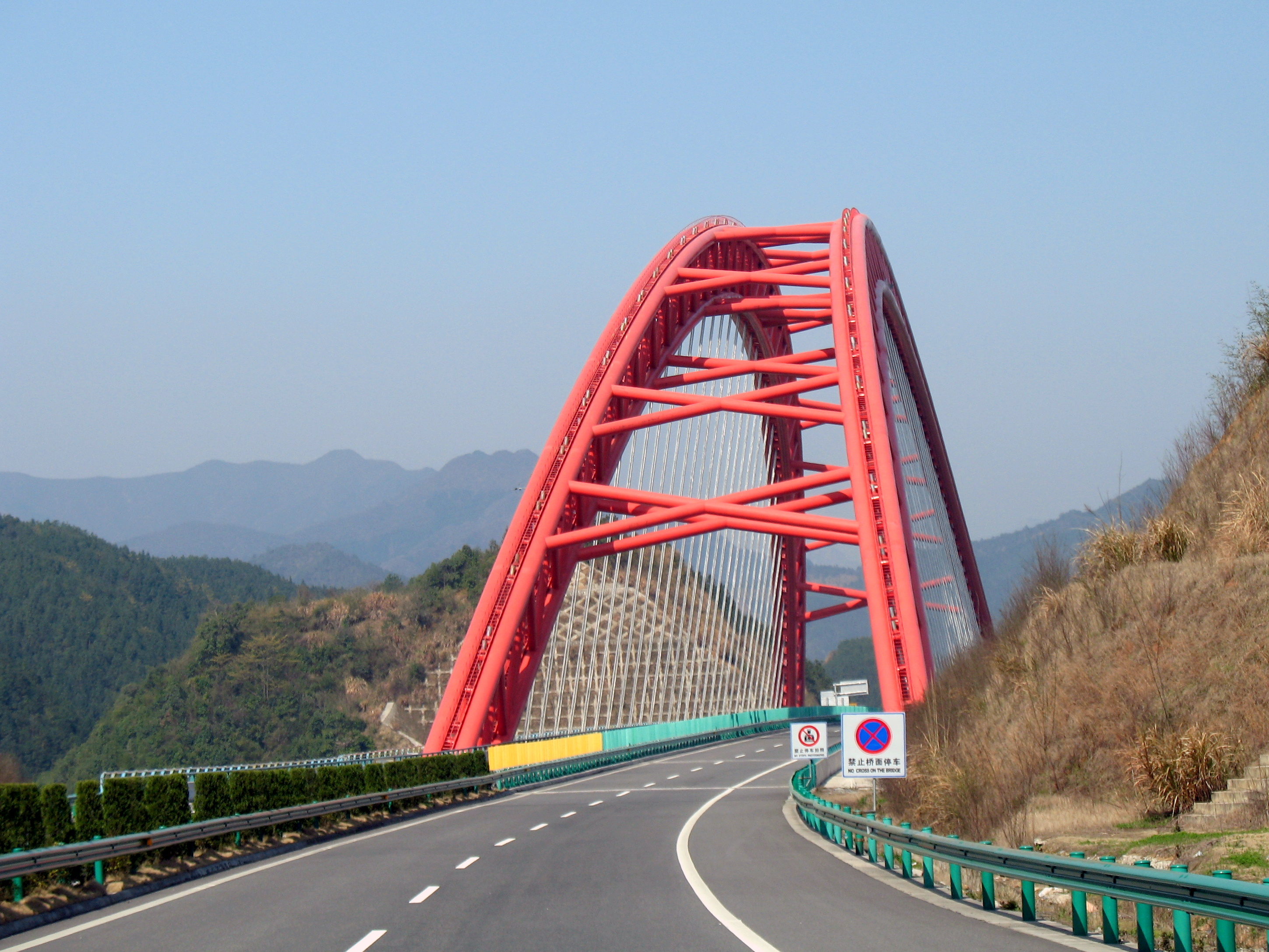
The expressway crossing over the Taiping Lake Bridge in Anhui

The expressway passes the following major cities:

- Beijing
- Langfang, Hebei
- Tianjin
- Cangzhou, Hebei
- Dezhou, Shandong
- Jinan, Shandong
- Tai'an, Shandong
- Zaozhuang, Shandong
- Huaian, Jiangsu
- Huaibei, Anhui
- Suzhou, Anhui
- Bengbu, Anhui
- Hefei, Anhui
- Tongling, Anhui
- Huangshan, Anhui
- Quzhou, Zhejiang
- Nanping, Fujian
- Fuzhou, Fujian

== Detailed Route ==
From Beijing
Continues as: Dexian Road
	South S50 5th Ring Road; G104 Road; G105 Road Wufutang Station
Beijing City; Hebei Province
	S24 Langzhuo Expressway (To be renamed G95 Capital Ring Expressway); Towards Langfang
	S371 Road; Towards Langfang
	S273 Road; Towards Yongqing
	S3 Langcang Expressway
Service Area
	S272 Road; Towards Tiaohetou
	X522 Road; Towards Geyuchen
	G2 Jinghu Expressway; G2501 Binbao Expressway
Concurrent with G2 Jinghu Expressway
	S112 Road
Wanqingtuo Service Area
	G18 Rongwu Expressway; S7 Jinbao Expressway
Concurrent with G18 Rongwu Expressway
Tianjin Metropolitan Area
Concurrent with G18 Rongwu Expressway
	G18 Rongwu Expressway
Tianjin Metropolitan Area
	S310 Road; Towards G104 Road
	S116 Road; S311 Road; Towards Jinghai
Jinghai Service Area
	S380 Road; Towards G104 Road
	S313 Road; Towards G104 Road
	S60 Binshi Expressway (To be renamed G0211 Jinshi Expressway)
	S6 Jincang Expressway
Tangguantun Service Area
Tangguantun Toll Station
Tianjin City; Hebei Province
Qingxian Service Area
	S021 Road; Towards Qingxian
Concurrent with G2 Jinghu Expressway
	G2 Jinghu Expressway; S3 Langcang Expressway
	S331 Road; Cangzhou
	G1811 Huangshi Expressway
Cangzhou Service Area
	S302 Road; Towards Nanpi-Botou
Dongguang Service Area
	S383 Road; Dongguang
Wuqiao Service Area
Hebei Province; Shandong Province
Dezhou Toll Station
	S12 Binde Expressway
	G104 Road
	S353 Road; Towards Dezhou
Dezhou Service Area
	S315 Road; Towards Fengzi
Pingyuan Service Area
	Towards Pingyuan
	S316 Road; Towards Yucheng
Yucheng Service Area
	G20 Qingyin Expressway (After assignment, G2516 Donglu Expressway will be concurrent)
	G308 Road; Towards Qihe
	G2001 Jinan Ring Expressway; S1 Jiliao Expressway
Concurrent with G2001 Jinan Ring Expressway
	G35 Jiguang Expressway
Concurrent with G35 Jiguang Expressway
	G220 Road Dayangzhuang Station; TowardsJinan West Railway Station Jinan
Concurrent with G35 Jiguang Expressway; Concurrent with G2001 Jinan Ring Expressway
	G35 Jiguang Expressway; G2001 Jinan Ring Expressway
	G104 Road; Chingqing
Jinan Service Area
	G104 Road; Wande
Tai'an Service Area
	S330 Road; Tai'an
	S31 Taixin Expressway; S329 Road
	G104 Road; Manzhuang
	S333 Road; Ciyao
Ningyang Service Area
	G104 Road; Towards Qufu
	G327 Road; West Towards Qufu; East Towards Sishui County
	G1511 Rilan Expressway
	S342 Road; Zoucheng
	Towards G104 Road
Zoucheng Service Area
	Tengzhou
	S343 Road; Tengzhou
	S83 Zaozhuang Connecting Line Expressway
	S904 Road; Zaozhuang
Zaozhuang Service Area
Xuecheng Service Area
	S38 Lancao Expressway
	Towards Hanzhuang
Zaozhuang Toll Station
Shandong Province; Jiangsu Province
	X301 Road; Towards G206 Road
Jiewang-Qingshanquan Service Area
	S38 Lancao Expressway
Xuzhou City
	G2513 Huaixu Expressway
Xuzhou City
	G310 Road; Towards Xuzhou
	X305 Road
	S322 Road; Towards Xuzhou
	S69 Jixu Expressway
Liuji Service Area
	G310 Road; Towards Xuzhou
	X305 Road; Towards Tongshan District
	G30 Lianhuo Expressway
Concurrent with G30 Lianhuo Expressway
Toll Station
Jiangsu Province; Anhui Province
Concurrent with G30 Lianhuo Expressway
	G30 Lianhuo Expressway; S301 Road; Xiaoxian
Zhuangli Service Area
	S101 Road; X023 Road; Towards Huaibei
Fuli Service Area
	S4 Sisu Expressway; S6 Sudeng Expressway
	Suzhou
	X057 Road
Junwang Service Area
	G206 Road
	G36 Ningluo Expressway
	G206 Road; Towards Bengbu
Yuhui Service Area
	S207 Road; Towards Bengbu
	S17 Benghe Expressway
	S311 Road; Towards Huainan-Dingyuan
Wuwei Service Area
	X010 Road
	X006 Road; X027 Road
	G40 Hushan Expressway; G42 Hurong Expressway; G4001 Hefei Ring Expressway
Concurrent with G40 Hushan Expressway; Concurrent with G42 Hurong Expressway; Concurrent with G4001 Hefei Ring Expressway
Concurrent with G40 Hushan Expressway; Concurrent with G42 Hurong Expressway
	G40 Hushan Expressway; G42 Hurong Expressway
	S331 Road; Feidong
Feidong Service Area
	S105 Road
Hefei Metropolitan Area
	Baohe District, Hefei Hefei South Railway Station; Hefei South Railway Station
Concurrent with G4001 Hefei Ring Expressway
	G4001 Hefei Ring Expressway; G4212 He'an Expressway
Concurrent with G4212 He'an Expressway
	Baohe District, Hefei
Hefei Metropolitan Area
	S103 Road; Towards Feixi
Fengle Service Area
	X005 Road
	S319 Road; Towards Lujiang
Concurrent with G4212 He'an Expressway
	G4212 He'an Expressway
	X065 Road; Towards Lujiang
Shaxi Service Area
	S103 Road; Nihe
	X098 Road
	S103 Road; Towards Hengbu
Zhoutan Service Area
Congyang Toll Station
	S103 Road
Tongling Bridge
Toll Station
	S103 Road; S320 Road; Towards Tongling
Toll Station
	G50 Huyu Expressway
	G318 Road; S103 Road; Qingyang
Jiuhuashan Service Area
236	S325 Road; Towards Lingyang-Shitai
Taiping Lake Bridge
248	S103 Road
	Gantang
Service Area
	G205 Road; S103 Road
	G205 Road; S103 Road Huangshan
Chengkan Service Area
	Towards G205 Road; Towards Huizhou
337	S103 Road; Huangshan
Huangshan City Proper (Tunxi District)
346 A-B	G56 Hangrui Expressway; S42 Huangfu Expressway
Concurrent with G56 Hangrui Expressway
Huangshan City Proper (Tunxi District)
Xiuning Service Area
356	X020 Road; Towards Wucheng
Concurrent with G56 Hangrui Expressway
363	G56 Hangrui Expressway
Toll Station
Anhui Province; Zhejiang Province
Toll Station
	G205 Road; X613 Road; Majin
Kaihua Service Area
420	Kaihua
	X501 Road; Towards Fangcun
Fangcun Service Area
	X204 Road
	G60 Hukun Expressway
Quzhou City Proper
	Towards Quzhou-Centre; X204 Road
Quzhou City Proper
Jiangshan Service Area
501	Towards Jiangshan; S315 Road
	X404 Road
Xianxia Service Area
	G205 Road; Xikou
	G205 Road; Nianbadu
Zhejiang Province; Fujian Province
Tangguantun Toll Station
Zhongxin Service Area
	G205 Road; Towards Pucheng
	G205 Road; Pucheng
	S0311 Pujian Expressway
Concurrent with S0311 Pujian Expressway
	G205 Road; Linjiang
	G205 Road; Shibei
	X816 Road; Wufu
Nantai Service Area
Concurrent with S0311 Pujian Expressway
	G1514 Ningshang Expressway; S0311 Pujian Expressway
Concurrent with G1514 Ningshang Expressway
	G1514 Ningshang Expressway
	S303 Road; Jianyang
	X819 Road
Fengle Service Area
	S303 Road
	G25 Changshen
Under Construction
Under Construction
	G1501 Fuzhou Ring Expressway
Concurrent with G1501 Fuzhou Ring Expressway
Concurrent with G1501 Fuzhou Ring Expressway
G1501 Fuzhou Ring Expressway
	G70 Fuyin Expressway
Concurrent with G70 Fuyin Expressway
(21)	X117 Road; Shangjie; Towards Fuzhou
Shangjie Service Area
	S35 Fuzhao Expressway
	S7021 Fuzhou South Connecting Line
Concurrent with G70 Fuyin Expressway
G70 Fuyin Expressway
	G15 Shenhai Expressway
Planned to be continued to Taipei, Taiwan
Towards Beijing

== See also ==
- Taiwan Strait Tunnel Project
- Tongling Bridge
