= Expressways of Jiangsu =

Road network in Jiangsu, China

A map of the expressway network in Jiangsu.

The Chinese eastern coastal province of Jiangsu has an expansive network of national and provincial-level expressways. At the end of 2010, the province had 4,046 km (2,514 mi) of expressways, including 2,783 km (1,729 mi) of national expressways and 1,263 km (785 mi) of provincial expressways, and by 2020, the province expects to have 5,829 km (3,622 mi) of national and provincial-level expressways.

== Numbering ==
Expressways in Jiangsu province (and the rest of China) are designated with a letter prefix, which represents whether it is a provincial or national-level expressway, followed by a two-to-four character alphanumeric designation. The letter prefix G, which stands for Guodao (Chinese: 国道), literally meaning national road, is used for national expressways, and the letter prefix S, which stands for Shengdao (Chinese: 省道), literally meaning provincial road, is used for provincial expressways. National expressways are numbered according to the National Trunk Highway System numbering rules. In Jiangsu, the provincial-level expressways are assigned numbers as follows:

- North-south expressways are given odd numbers less than 70.
- East-west expressways are given even numbers less than 70.
- Branch and port expressways are given numbers larger than 70. Currently the highest designation is 96.

== List of routes ==
There are 36 provincial expressways currently completed, under construction, or in the planning stages as part of the provincial expressway plan. These include 13 north-south expressways, 9 east-west expressways, and 14 branch lines, given numbers greater than 70. In addition, there are 14 national-level expressways that are entirely in or will pass through the province. In 2013, some of the provincial-level expressways have also been upgraded as national expressways and given national-level expressway numbers.

=== National-level expressways ===
Name and number	Abbreviated name	Termini in Jiangsu		Length	
Name and number	Abbreviated name	Termini in Jiangsu		Current	Projected
G2 Beijing–Shanghai Expressway	Jinghu	Xinyi (Shandong border)	Huaqiao, Kunshan (Shanghai border)	481 km (299 mi)	Fully complete
G3 Beijing–Taipei Expressway	Jingtai	Hanzhuang, Xuzhou (Shandong border)	Luogang, Xuzhou (Anhui border)	76 km (47 mi)	Fully complete
G15 Shenyang–Haikou Expressway	Shenhai	Ganyu (Shandong border)	Taicang (Shanghai border)	490 km (300 mi)	Fully complete
G1522 Changshu–Taizhou Expressway	Changtai	Changshu	Shengze Town, Suzhou (Zhejiang border)	100 km (62 mi)	Fully complete
G25 Changchun–Shenzhen Expressway	Changshen	Ganyu (Shandong border)	Fuziling, Yixing (Zhejiang border)	453 km (281 mi)	530 km (330 mi)
G2503 Nanjing Ring Expressway		Ring road		101 km (63 mi)	178 km (111 mi)
G2513 Huai'an–Xuzhou Expressway	Huaixu	Huai'an District, Huai'an	Xuzhou	223 km (139 mi)	Fully complete
G30 Lianyungang–Khorgas Expressway	Lianhuo	Lianyungang	Xuzhou (Anhui border)	236 km (147 mi)	Fully complete
G36 Nanjing–Luoyang Expressway	Ningluo	Maqun, Nanjing	Liuhe, Nanjing (Anhui border)	35 km (22 mi)	Fully complete
G40 Shanghai–Xi'an Expressway	Hushan	Qidong (Shanghai border)	Xingdian Town, Nanjing (Anhui border)	244 km (152 mi)	364 km (226 mi)
G4011 Yangzhou–Liyang Expressway	Yangli	Hanjiang District, Yangzhou	Liyang, Changzhou	100 km (62 mi)	Fully complete
G42 Shanghai–Chengdu Expressway	Hurong	Kunshan, Suzhou (Shanghai border)	Jiangpu, Nanjing (Anhui border)	181 km (112 mi)	282 km (175 mi)
G4211 Nanjing–Wuhu Expressway	Ningwu	Jiangning, Nanjing	Tongjing (Anhui border)	26 km (16 mi)	Fully complete
G50 Shanghai–Chongqing Expressway	Huyu	Xinta (Shanghai border)	Badu (Zhejiang border)	50 km (31 mi)	Fully complete

=== Provincial-level expressways ===
Name and number	Abbreviated name	Termini in Jiangsu		Length	
Name and number	Abbreviated name	Termini in Jiangsu		Current	Projected
13 North-South Expressways
S5 Changshu–Jiashan Expressway	Changjia	Changshu	Zhejiang border	44 km (27 mi)	75 km (47 mi)
S9 Suzhou–Shaoxing Expressway	Sushao	Xiangcheng District, Suzhou	Zhejiang border	55 km (34 mi)	107 km (66 mi)
S19 Nantong–Wuxi Expressway	Tongxi	Rudong, Nantong	Shuofang, Wuxi	69 km (43 mi)	139 km (86 mi)
S29 Yancheng–Jingjiang Expressway	Yanjing	Yancheng	Jingjiang	169 km (105 mi)	Fully complete
S35 Taizhou–Zhenjiang Expressway	Taizhen	Taizhou	Danyang	0 km (0 mi)	78 km (48 mi)
S39 Jiangdu–Yixing Expressway	Jiangyi	Jiangdu	Yixing	0 km (0 mi)	145 km (90 mi)
S45 Yixing–Hangzhou Expressway	Yihang	Yixing	Zhejiang border	0 km (0 mi)	27 km (17 mi)
S49 Xinyi–Yangzhou Expressway	Xinyang	Xinyi	Yangmiao, Yangzhou	137 km (85 mi)	238 km (148 mi)
S51 Liyang–Huangshan Expressway	Lihuang	Liyang	Anhui border	0 km (0 mi)	17 km (11 mi)
S55 Nanjing–Xuancheng Expressway	Ningxuan	Nanjing Ring Expressway	Anhui border	75 km (47 mi)	92 km (57 mi)
S59 Nanjing–Hexian Expressway	Ninghe	Pukou	Anhui border	0 km (0 mi)	20 km (12 mi)
S65 Xuzhou–Mingguang Expressway	Xuming	China National Highway 104	Anhui border	0 km (0 mi)	6 km (3.7 mi)
S69 Jinan–Xuzhou Expressway	Jixu	Shandong border	Liuji, Xuzhou	62 km (39 mi)	79 km (49 mi)
9 East-West Expressways
S8 Siyang–Suzhou Expressway	Sisu	Siyang	Anhui border	0 km (0 mi)	61 km (38 mi)
S18 Yancheng–Huai'an Expressway	Yanhuai	Yancheng	Huai'an	106 km (66 mi)	144 km (89 mi)
S22 Yizheng–Nanjing Expressway	Yining	Yizheng	Yanjiang	0 km (0 mi)	36 km (22 mi)
S28 Qidong–Yangzhou Expressway	Qiyang	Qidong	Yangzhou	134 km (83 mi)	262 km (163 mi)
S32 Chongming–Haimen Expressway	Chonghai	Chongming	Haimen	0 km (0 mi)	9 km (5.6 mi)
S38 Changshu–Hefei Expressway	Changhe	Changshu	Anhui border	196 km (122 mi)	234 km (145 mi)
S48 Shanghai–Yixing Expressway	Huyi	Taicang	Yixing	107 km (66 mi)	169 km (105 mi)
S58 Shanghai–Changzhou Expressway	Huchang	Shanghai border	Changzhou	75 km (47 mi)	145 km (90 mi)
S68 Liyang–Wuhu Expressway	Liwu	Liyang	Anhui border	0 km (0 mi)	71 km (44 mi)
14 Branch Expressways
S72 Port of Lianyungang North Port Expressway		G25 Changchun–Shenzhen Expressway	G30 Lianyungang–Khorgas Expressway	0 km (0 mi)	11 km (6.8 mi)
S73 Port of Lianyungang East Port Expressway		Port of Lianyungang	G30 Lianyungang–Khorgas Expressway	0 km (0 mi)	13 km (8.1 mi)
S75 Yancheng–Huai'an Expressway Funing–Xinghua–Taizhou Branch Line	Fuxingtai Branch Line	Funing	Taizhou	0 km (0 mi)	136 km (85 mi)
S79 Shanghai–Xi'an Expressway Nantong Branch Line	Nantong Branch Line	G40 Shanghai–Xi'an Expressway	China National Highway 204	9 km (5.6 mi)	Fully complete
S80 Port of Taicang North Port Expressway		Port of Taicang	G15 Shenyang–Haikou Expressway	0 km (0 mi)	15 km (9.3 mi)
S81 Port of Taicang South Port Expressway		Port of Taicang	G15 Shenyang–Haikou Expressway	4 km (2.5 mi)	8 km (5.0 mi)
S82 Port of Zhangjiagang Port Expressway		Port of Zhangjiagang	S38 Changshu–Hefei Expressway	0 km (0 mi)	21 km (13 mi)
S83 Suzhou–Shaoxing Expressway Wuxi Branch Line	Wuxi Branch Line	S9 Suzhou–Shaoxing Expressway	S19 Nantong–Wuxi Expressway	10 km (6.2 mi)	Fully complete
S85 Changshu–Hefei Expressway Liyang Branch Line	Liyang Branch Line	G4011 Yangzhou–Liyang Expressway	S38 Changshu–Hefei Expressway	0 km (0 mi)	39 km (24 mi)
S86 Shanghai–Chengdu Expressway Zhenjiang Branch Line	Zhenjiang Branch Line	Guantang Bridge, Zhenjiang	G42 Shanghai–Chengdu Expressway	11 km (6.8 mi)	Fully complete
S87 Changchun–Shenzhen Expressway Nanjing Branch Line	Nanjing Branch Line	Gaoqiaomen Interchange, Nanjing	Dongshan Interchange, Nanjing	7 km (4.3 mi)	Fully complete
S88 Nanjing Lukou International Airport Expressway	Nanjing Airport	G42 Shanghai–Chengdu Expressway	Nanjing Lukou International Airport	29 km (18 mi)	Fully complete
S92 Changchun–Shenzhen Expressway Jinhu Branch Line	Jinhu Branch Line	Jinhu	G25 Changchun–Shenzhen Expressway	0 km (0 mi)	18 km (11 mi)
S96 Xinyi–Yangzhou Expressway Suqian Branch Line	Suqian Branch Line	S49 Xinyi–Yangzhou Expressway	Suqian	8 km (5.0 mi)	Fully complete
