= G2 Beijing–Shanghai Expressway =

Major north-south highway in China

Beijing–Shanghai Expressway
- 北京－上海高速公路
- Jinghu Expressway 京沪高速

Route information
- Part of AH3
- Length: 1,262 km (784 mi)
- Existed: 18 December 2000 –present

Major junctions
- North end: 3rd Ring Road in Chaoyang, BJ
- G45 / G4501 in Tongzhou, BJ; G3 (N) in Wuqing, TJ; G2501 in Wuqing, TJ; G18 (W) in Wuqing, TJ; G18 (E) in Xiqing, TJ; G3 (S) in Cangzhou, HE; G1811 in Cangzhou, HE; G2516 in Jinan, SD; G20 / G2001 (W / W) in Jinan, SD; G20 (E) in Jinan, SD; G2001 (E) in Jinan, SD; G22 in Laiwu, SD; G1511 in Linyi, SD; G30 in Xinyi, JS; G25 in Huai'an, JS; G2513 in Huai'an, JS; G40 (W) in Yangzhou, JS; G40 (E) in Taixing, JS; G42 (W) in Wuxi, JS; G15W in Suzhou, JS; G1503 in Kunshan, JS; G15 in Qingpu, SH
- South end: Middle Ring Road in Putuo, SH

Location
- Country: China

Highway system
- National Trunk Highway System; Primary; Auxiliary; National Highways; Transport in China
| ← G0122 | → G0211 |

The Beijing–Shanghai Expressway designated as G2 and commonly abbreviated as the Jinghu Expressway is a major expressway of China, linking the capital Beijing in the north to Shanghai on the central coast. It extends 1262 kilometres in length, and was finished in 2006.

The expressway's name, Jinghu, is a combination of the two cities' one-character Chinese abbreviations: Jing stands for Beijing, while Hu stands for Shanghai. The trip from Beijing to Shanghai by automobile takes about ten hours with multiple drivers taking shifts and under good road conditions.

== Route ==
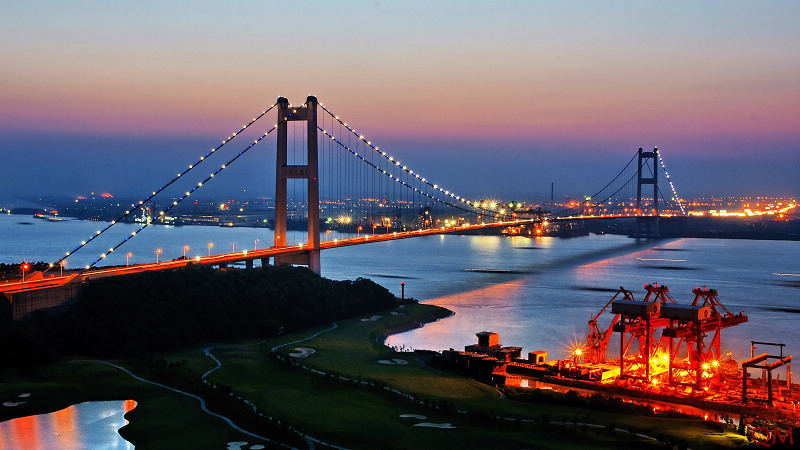
The expressway crosses the Yangtze River over the Jiangyin Suspension Bridge

The expressway passes the following major cities:

- Beijing
- Langfang, Hebei
- Tianjin
- Cangzhou, Hebei
- Dezhou, Shandong
- Jinan, Shandong
- Laiwu, Shandong
- Linyi, Shandong
- Huaian, Jiangsu
- Yangzhou, Jiangsu
- Taizhou, Jiangsu
- Wuxi, Jiangsu
- Suzhou, Jiangsu
- Shanghai

== Interchanges ==
From Beijing
| 0 | East 3rd Ring Road Shilihe Station South 3rd Ring Road |
| 1 A-B | East 4th Ring Road; South 4th Ring Road |
| 3 A-B | East S50 5th Ring Road; South S50 5th Ring Road |
Beijing Metropolitan Area
Dayangfang Toll Station
Majuqiao Service Area
| 13 A-B | G45-East G4501 6th Ring Road; G45-South G4501 6th Ring Road |
| | X004 Road; X301 Road |
Beijing Yingsi Inspection Station
Beijing City; Hebei Province
Langfang Metropolitan Area
| | Beihuan Road; Chuangye Road; Langfang-Centre |
Langfang Metropolitan Area
Hebei Province; Tianjin City
| | S40 Jingjintang Expressway; Towards S30 Jingjin Expressway |
Sicundian Service Area
| | G104 Road; G105 Road |
| | G3 Jingtai Expressway; G2501 Binbao Expressway |
Concurrent with G3 Jingtai Expressway
| | S112 Road |
Wanqingtuo Service Area
| | G18 Rongwu Expressway; S7 Jinbao Expressway |
Concurrent with G18 Rongwu Expressway
Tianjin Metropolitan Area
Concurrent with G18 Rongwu Expressway
| | G18 Rongwu Expressway |
Tianjin Metropolitan Area
| | S310 Road; Towards G104 Road |
| | S116 Road; S311 Road; Towards Jinghai |
Jinghai Service Area
| | S380 Road; Towards G104 Road |
| | S313 Road; Towards G104 Road |
| | S60 Binshi Expressway (To be renamed G0211 Jinshi Expressway) |
| | S6 Jincang Expressway |
Tangguantun Service Area
Tangguantun Toll Station
Tianjin City; Hebei Province
Qingxian Service Area
| | S021 Road; Towards Qingxian |
Concurrent with G3 Jingtai Expressway
| | G3 Jingtai Expressway; S3 Langcang Expressway |
Cangzhou Metropolitan Area
| | Towards S331 Road |
Cangzhou Metropolitan Area
| | G104 Road; G105 Road |
| | G307 Road |
| | G1811 Huangshi Expressway |
Under Construction
Hebei Province; Shandong Province
| | S12 Binde Expressway |
| | S316 Road |
| | S249 Road; Linyi-Duoshi |
| | G2516 Donglu Expressway |
After Assignment, will be concurrent with G2516 Donglu Expressway
| | X201 Road; X207 Road |
Service Area
Under Construction
After Assignment, will be concurrent with G2516 Donglu Expressway
| | G20-G2001 Jinan Ring Expressway (After assignment, G2516 Donglu Expressway will be concurrent) |
Concurrent with G2001 Jinan Ring Expressway concurrent with G20 Qingyin Expressway
| | G220 Road |
Third Jinan Bridge
| | X054 Road |
Concurrent with G20 Qingyin Expressway
| | G20 Qingyin Expressway |
| | G35 Jiguang Expressway |
| | S102 Road |
Service Area
| | G309 Road |
Concurrent with G2001 Jinan Ring Expressway
| | G2001 Jinan Ring Expressway; Gangjiu Road |
| | X051 |
| | X004 |
Zhangqiu Service Area
| | S243 Road; S244 Road; Towards Zhangqiu |
| | S327 Road; Towards Boshan |
Xueyehu Service Area
| | S242 Road; Towards Laiwu |
Laiwu Service Area
| | Towards G205 Road |
| | G22 Qinglan Expressway; S29 Binlai Expressway |
Laiwu Service Area
| | S329 Road; Towards Laiwu |
| | S29 Laitai Expressway |
| | G205 Road; Gangcheng |
Xintai Service Area
| | S31 Taixin Expressway |
| | G205 Road; Mengyin |
| | X014 Road; Towards G205 Road; Dongzhuang |
Yinan Service Area
| | G205 Road; S229 Road |
| | G1511 Rilan Expressway |
Linyi Metropolitan Area
Linyi Service Area
| 625 | G327 Road; Linyi |
| | G206 Road |
Linyi Metropolitan Area
| | S38 Lancao Expressway |
| | G206 Road |
| | S232 Road; Towards Tancheng |
Tancheng Service Area
| | G205 Road; Towards Xinyi |
Lusushengjie Toll Station
Shandong Province; Jiangsu Province
| | S49 Xinyang Expressway |
| 719 | S323 Road; Towards Tancheng |
| | G30 Lianhuo Epressway |
Xinyi Service Area
| | X565 Road |
| | S245 Road; Towards Shuyang |
Shuyang Service Area
| | S324 Road; S326 Road |
| 781 | G205 Road |
Huai'an-Chuanxing Service Area
| | S236 Road; Towards Huai'an |
| 819 | G25 Changshen Expressway |
| | S237 Road; Huai'an |
| | X101 Road; S237 Road; Huai'an |
| | G2513 Huaixu Expressway; S18 Yanhuai Expressway |
Huai'an-Liudong Service Area
| | X301 Road; Towards Caodian |
| | S331 Road; Baoying |
Fanshui Service Area
| | S332 Road towards Jinhu |
| | S333 Road; Gaoyou |
Longben Service Area
| | X023 Road; X308 Road; Towards Baqiao-Cheluo |
| | X205 Road; Towards Shaobo-Zhenwu |
| | S28 Qiyang Expressway |
| | G328 Road; Towards Jiangdu |
| | G40 Hushan Expressway |
Concurrent with G40 Hushan Expressway
Zhengyi Service Area
| | S231 Road; Towards Taizhou-Gaogang |
| | S35 Taizhen Expressway |
Xuanbao Service Area
| | S232 Road; Towards Taixing; X209 Road |
| | S232 Road; Towards Taixing-Huangqiao |
Concurrent with G40 Hushan Expressway
| | G40 Hushan Expressway; S29 Yanjing Expressway |
Guangling Service Area
| | S229 Road; S336 Road; Jingjiang |
| | S336 Road; Jingjiang |
Jiangyin Bridge Toll Station
Jiangyin Bridge
| | Benjiang Middle Road; X301 Road; Jiangyin |
| | S338 Road; S340 Road; Jiangyin |
| | S38 Changhe Expressway |
| | X305 Road |
Yanqiao Service Area
| | G42 Hurong Expressway; Tongjiang Avenue; Wuxi |
Concurrent with G42 Hurong Expressway
| | Taihu Avenue |
Wuxi Metropolitan Area
Meicun Service Area
| | G312 Road; X204 Road; Sunan Shuofang International Airport |
| (115 A-B) | S19 Tongxi Expressway |
Wuxi Metropolitan Area
Suzhou Metropolitan Area
| (122 A-B) | S9 Sushao Expressway |
| (133) | Xihuang Highway; Suzhou New District; G312 Road |
Suzhou Metropolitan Area
| (140 A-B-C) | S338 Road; Suzhou; G15W Changtai Expressway |
Suzhou Metropolitan Area
Yangchenghu Service Area
| | Xindai Avenue |
Suzhou Metropolitan Area
| (164 A-B) | S5 Changjia Expressway |
| (172) | S224 Road; Towards Kunshan-Zhangpu |
| | X202 Road; Huaqiao Huaqiao Railway Station |
Jiangqiao Toll Station
| | X020 Road |
Huaqiao Toll Station
| (196 A-B-C) | G1501 Shanghai Ring Expressway; X191 Road Anting Station |
Jiangsu Province; Shanghai City
| (203) | S224 Jiasong Highway |
| (206) | G15 Shenhai Expressway |
Shanghai Metropolitan Area
Jiangqiao Toll Station
| (217 A-B) | S20 Outer Expressway |
| | Cao'an Highway |
| | Middle Ring Road |
Continues as: Wuning Road
Towards Beijing

== See also ==
- Jiangyin Suspension Bridge over the Yangtze River
