= G4212 Hefei–Anqing Expressway =

Expressway in China

Hefei–Anqing Expressway
- 合肥－安庆高速公路
- He'an Expressway 合安高速公路

Route information
- Auxiliary route of G42

Major junctions
- North end: G3 / G4001 in Hefei, Anhui
- West end: G50 in Anqing, Anhui

Location
- Country: China

Highway system
- National Trunk Highway System; Primary; Auxiliary; National Highways; Transport in China
← G4211	→ G4213

The G4212 Hefei–Anqing Expressway (Chinese: 合肥—安庆高速公路), commonly referred to as the He'an Expressway (Chinese: 合安高速公路), is an expressway in China that connects Hefei, Anhui and Anqing, Anhui. It is a spur of G42 Shanghai–Chengdu Expressway and is completely in Anhui Province.
