= G42 Shanghai–Chengdu Expressway =

Expressway of China

Shanghai–Chengdu Expressway
- 上海－成都高速公路
- Hurong Expressway 沪蓉高速公路
- China's expressway network with the G42 in red

Route information
- Length: 1,220 mi (1,960 km)
- Existed: 2014–present

Major junctions
- East end: Middle Ring Road, Shanghai
- G15 – Qingpu District, Shanghai; G1501 – Anting, Shanghai; G15W – Wuzhong District, Suzhou, Jiangsu; G2 – Huishan District, Wuxi, Jiangsu; G4011 – Dantu District, Zhenjiang, Jiangsu; G2501 – Jiangning District, Nanjing, Jiangsu; G36 – Qixia District, Nanjing, Jiangsu G25 – Baixia District, Nanjing, Jiangsu; G2501 G4211 – Yuhuatai District, Nanjing, Jiangsu G40 – Pukou District, Nanjing, Jiangsu; G3 G4001 G5001 – Feidong County, Hefei, Anhui; G35 – Yu'an District, Lu'an, Anhui; G40 – Huoqiu County, Lu'an, Anhui; G45 – Macheng, Hubei; G4201 – Xinzhou District, Wuhan, Wuhan, Hubei; G70 – Huangpi District, Wuhan, Hubei; G4 – Dongxihu District, Wuhan, Hubei; G55 – Duodao District, Jingmen, Hubei; G50 – Yiling District, Yichang, Hubei; G50 – Dianjiang County, Chongqing; G65 – Linshui County, Guang'an, Sichuan; G75 – Nanchong, Sichuan; G93 – Chuanshan District, Suining, Sichuan; G4201 – Longquanyi District, Chengdu, Sichuan
- West end: East 3rd Ring Road and East Erxianqiao Road, Chengdu, Sichuan

Location
- Country: China

Highway system
- National Trunk Highway System; Primary; Auxiliary; National Highways; Transport in China
← G4015	→ G4201

The Shanghai–Chengdu Expressway (上海－成都高速公路), designated as G42 and commonly referred to as the Hurong Expressway (沪蓉高速公路), is an east–west bound expressway that connects the eastern metropolis of Shanghai to Chengdu, the capital city of Sichuan.

The expressway passes through six provinces and serves major cities such as Suzhou, Wuxi, Changzhou, Nanjing, Hefei, Wuhan, and Yichang. The eastern terminus of G42 is at the Wuning Road Interchange of Shanghai Middle Ring Road. At its western terminus, the expressway intersects the East 3rd Ring Road and connects East Erxianqiao Road in Chenghua District, Chengdu. The expressway spans 1,960 km (1,220 mi) in length.

With the completion of the remaining Chongqing–Yichang segment of the expressway construction in December 2014, the entire length of the Shanghai-Chengdu Expressway officially opened to motorists.

G42 is the principal highway of Yangtze Economic Corridor and therefore reportly facilitates 46.6 percent of the country's gross domestic product, making it one of the most economically active expressways in the world, like Interstate 95, although both US East coast and the Yangtze Economic Corridor is served by numerous other highways and means of transport.

== Route Description ==
=== Shanghai ===
In Shanghai Municipality, the G42 is an eight-lane expressway which concurs with G2 Beijing-Shanghai Expressway for its entire length, and has a speed limit of 120 km/h (75 mph). The expressway begins at Wuning Road Interchange in Shanghai Middle Ring Road, traveling eastbound. Soon after the intersection with the S20 Shanghai Outer Ring Expressway in Jiading District, the expressway becomes a tollway at Jiangqiao toll plaza. In Qingpu District, it intersects with G15 Shenyang-Haikou Expressway via a partial cloverleaf interchange. At Anting Town, the G42 connects with G1501 Shanghai Ring Expressway through a brief connector and two trumpet interchanges, then intersects with the G1501 via an overpass and enters Kunshan, Jiangsu.

=== Jiangsu ===
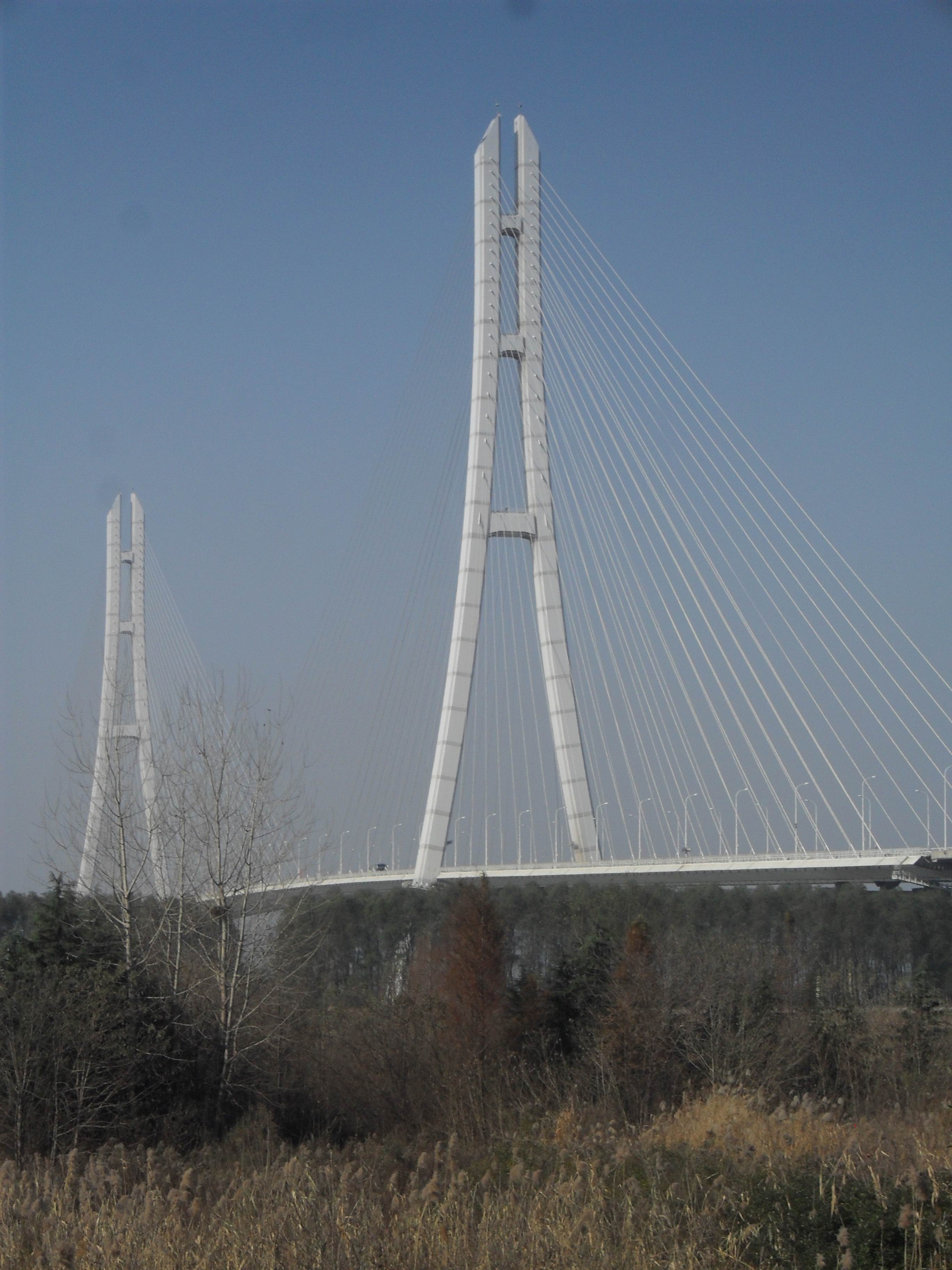
The expressway crosses the Yangtze River over the Third Nanjing Yangtze Bridge

The G42 is an eight-lane expressway throughout the province of Jiangsu and has a maximum speed limit of 120 km/h (75 mph). It is run concurrently with G2 Beijing-Shanghai Expressway until Huishan District, Wuxi, where it splits with the northeast-bound G2 and continues east. The expressway bypasses downtown Kunshan and meets Suzhou Ring Expressway (concurs with Jiangsu S5 Changzhou-Jiaxing Expressway). The expressway then travels northwest to downtown Suzhou and intersects with G15W Changshu-Taizhou Expressway at Wuzhong District, Suzhou. From there the expressway turns slightly north and again encounters the Suzhou Ring Expressway (Jiangsu S9 Suzhou-Shaoxing Expressway) before entering Wuxi. In Wuxi, the expressway intersects with Jiangsu S19 Taihu Lake Ring Expressway before bypassing downtown, and splits with G2 at Tongjiang Avenue, continuing northwest. The G42 then connects with Jiangsu S48 Shanghai-Yixing Expressway northwest of downtown Wuxi, and meets Jiangsu S38/Anhui S24 Changshu-Hefei Expressway in Wujin District, Changzhou. Running north to the downtown Changzhou, G42 meets Jiangsu S39 Jiangdu-Yixing Expressway in Xinbei District, Changzhou. From there, G42 travels west, bypassing Danyang and connecting to Zhenjiang via Jiangsu S86 Zhenjiang Auxiliary. After meeting G4011 Yangzhou-Liyang Expressway in Dantu District, Zhenjiang, G42 continues westbound and enters Nanjing.

In Nanjing, G42 first intersects with the southeast portion of G2503 Nanjing Ring Expressway, then follows a partial cloverleaf interchange near Purple Mountain, Qixia District to interchange with northbound G36 Nanjing-Luoyang Expressway. For its entire length south to Yangtze River in Nanjing, G42 concurs with Jiangsu S001 Highway and intersects with G25 Changchun-Shenzhen Expressway near Baixia District. At Huashenmiao Interchange, the expressway interchanges with Jiangsu S55 Nanjing-Xuancheng Expressway/S88 Airport Expressway. Before crossing the Yangtze River, G42 connects to the north–south spur of G4211 Nanjing-Wuhu Expressway and concurs with G2501 again. Through traffic is then carried across the Yangtze River by Third Nanjing Yangtze Bridge, and the G42 splits with G2501 at an interchange to the east of Laoshan National Forest Park, where G42 turns west and concurs with G40 Shanghai-Xi'an Expressway for their remaining lengths in Jiangsu. At the town of Zhouzhuang, Pukou District, the expressway becomes a four-lane expressway and enters Anhui Province at Quanjiao County.

=== Anhui ===
In Anhui Province, the G42 concurs with G40 until Huoqiu County, Lu'an, and is mostly a 4-lane limited-access expressway except for a 42.64 km (26.50 mi) section between Feidong County and Hefei, which has been expanded to an eight-lane expressway in 2009. The expressway has a maximum speed limit of 110 km/h (68 mph) east of Hefei, and 120 km/h (75 mph) to the west, except for the section between Jinzhai County and Anhui-Hubei border, where a 100 km/h (62 mph) speed limit (80 km/h (50 mph) in tunnels) is enforced due to mountainous terrains. It concurs with G40 southwest bound. At a partial cloverleaf interchange east of Feidong County, Hefei, G42 turns north and concurs with G3 Beijing-Taipei Expressway and G4001 Hefei Ring Expressway briefly before splitting with G3 and heads west again. Here, G42 continues to concur with G4011 until Changfeng County, Hefei, where it continues westbound for Lu'an. The expressway then intersects with G35 in Yu'an District, Lu'an and splits with G40 at Huoqiu County, Lu'an. From there, G42 heads southwest into the Dabie Mountains. This portion of expressway generally follows the Anhui S210 Highway corridor, but it bypasses the Meishan Reservoir to the south, and is characterized by expansive bridges and lengthy tunnels. At the village of Changlingguan Pass, the expressway crosses Anhui-Hubei border and enters Macheng, Hubei Province.

=== Hubei ===
The expressway in Hubei

In Hubei Province, the G42 is a 4-lane limited access tollway, with a speed limit of 100 km/h (62 mph) for its entire length, except for tunnels, in which an 80 km/h (50 mph) speed limit is enforced. The expressway enters Hubei at the town of Muzidian and continues westbound to the Dabie Mountains Tunnel. With a length of 4,900 m (16,100 ft), the Dabie Mountains Tunnel is the longest tunnel on G42 east of Wuhan. The G42 then heads southwest, bypassing Macheng and intersects with G45 Daqing-Guangzhou Expressway to the west of downtown Macheng. Continuing southwest, the expressway concurs with Hubei S3 Wuhan-Macheng Expressway and turns west on G4201 Wuhan Ring Expressway in Xinzhou District, Wuhan, where it concurs briefly with G70 Fuzhou-Yinchuan Expressway. Through traffic is then carried across the Yangtze River again via the Yangluo Yangtze River Bridge. At the intersection with Hubei S2 Wuhan-Xiaogan Expressway, G42 splits with G70, which concurs with S2 northwest bound, and continues southwest. It then meets Hubei S18 Airport Expressway in Huangpi District, Wuhan and G4 Beijing-Hong Kong and Macau Expressway in Dongxihu District, Wuhan. At the intersection with G4, G42 splits with G4201 and continues westbound. It intersects with Hubei S49 Suizhou-Yueyang Expressway in Tianmen and G55 Erenhot-Guangzhou Expressway to the southwest of downtown Jingmen.

The G42 heads slightly south to reach the hydropower city of Yichang in Yiling District, where it currently terminates at the intersection with G50 Shanghai-Chongqing Expressway, Hubei S48 Wuhan-Yichang Expressway (which becomes Hubei S58 Three Gorges Expressway northwest of downtown Yichang), and Hubei S63 Laohekou-Shishou Expressway.

=== Chongqing ===
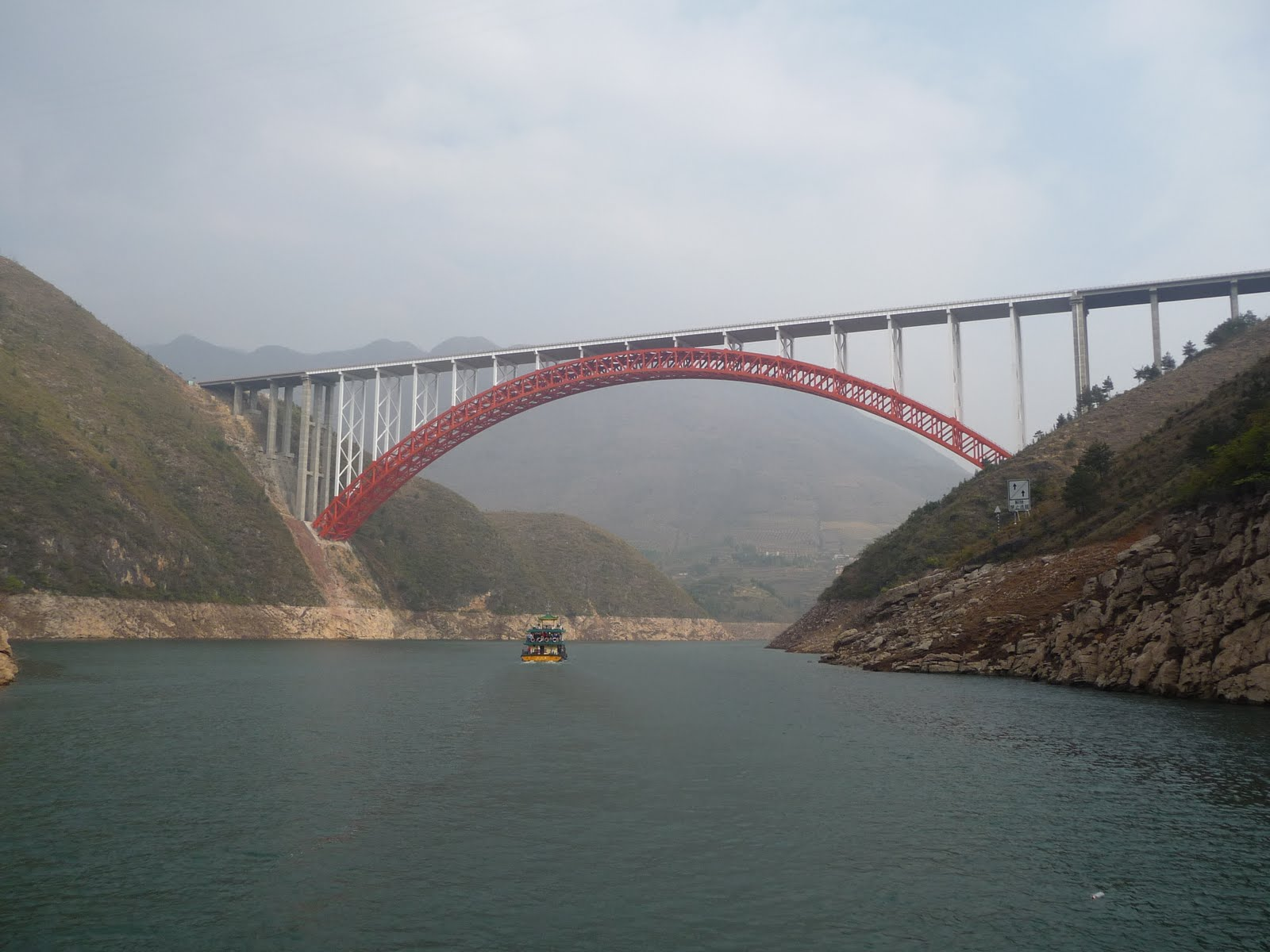
The expressway crosses the spectacular Daning River Bridge in Chongqing

The G42 is unfinished in Chongqing. The temporary eastern terminus is at the Wushan Interchange in Wushan County. From there the G42 is continuous throughout Chongqing. Due to restraints of the difficult terrains, the maximum speed on the expressway has been set at 80 km/h (50 mph). The expressway runs parallel to the Yangtze River behind the mountains of Three Gorges. At Gujiaba Interchange, G42 intersects with the non designated Wanzhou-Kai County Expressway. It then heads south and bypasses Wanzhou District. At Qinggangba Interchange, the G42 turns westbound and intersects with the Chongqing-Yibin Expressway, which spurs into the downtown of Wanzhou and becomes the G318 National Highway. G42 travels southwest until encountering G50 again in Taiping Interchange, Dianjiang County. The expressway would then travel westbound and enters Mingyue Mountain Tunnel, through which it crosses the Chongqing-Sichuan border and enters Sichuan Province.

=== Sichuan ===
In Sichuan Province, the G42 is a four-lane expressway with a speed limit of 80 km/h (50 mph), except for a few sections in Nanchong and Guang'an, where a 100 km/h (62 mph) speed limit is enforced. At Linshui County, Guang'an, the expressway encounters G65 Baotou-Maoming Expressway and turns northwest bound. It then bypasses Guang'an and continues northwest until intersecting with the unsigned northbound Nanchong Ring Expressway and southbound G75 Lanzhou-Haikou Expressway in Nanchong. The expressway would then continue southwest bound and meet G93 Chengdu-Chongqing Ring Expressway in Chuanshan District, Suining, and bypasses Suining to the north of its downtown. It crosses the Fu River and intersects with the unsigned Huimazhen-Suining Expressway. From there, the expressway continues to the city of Chengdu, where it intersects with G4201 Chengdu Ring Expressway in Longquanyi District at Luoshiba Interchange and proceeds to the East 3rd Ring Road. The G42 terminates after passing the East 3rd Ring Road and dipping briefly onto the East Erxianqiao Road.
