= G1511 Rizhao–Lankao Expressway =

Expressway in Shandong and Henan, China

Rizhao–Lankao Expressway
- 日照－兰考高速公路
- Rilan Expressway 日兰高速公路

Route information
- Auxiliary route of G15
- Length: 472.36 km (293.51 mi)

Major junctions
- East end: Yingbin Road, Donggang District, Rizhao, Shandong
- G15 in Donggang District, Rizhao, Shandong; G25 in Yinan, Linyi, Shandong; G2 in Fei County, Linyi, Shandong; G3 in Qufu, Jining, Shandong; Shandong S33 in Rencheng District, Jining, Shandong; G35 / Shandong S21 in Juye County, Heze, Shandong; G0321 / G35 in Mudan District, Heze, Shandong; Shandong S32 in Mudan District, Heze, Shandong
- West end: G30 / Henan S83 in Xiangfu District, Kaifeng, Henan

Location
- Country: China

Highway system
- National Trunk Highway System; Primary; Auxiliary; National Highways; Transport in China
← G1508	→ G1512

The G1511 Rizhao–Lankao Expressway (Chinese: 日照—兰考高速公路), commonly referred to as the Rilan Expressway (Chinese: 日兰高速公路), is a 472.36-kilometre-long Chinese expressway (293.51 mi) that connects the cities of Rizhao, in the province of Shandong, and Kaifeng, in the province of Henan. The expressway is named after the two localities at its termini, Rizhao, to the east, and Lankao County, a county under the administration of Kaifeng, to the west. Despite this namesake, the expressway's western terminus is actually in Xiangfu District, a neighbouring district in Kaifeng.

The expressway is a spur of G15 Shenyang–Haikou Expressway.

China Expwy G1511 sign with name

China Expwy G1511 sign no name

== Route ==
The expressway is entirely in Shandong except for a small portion in Henan. It connects the following prefectural-level cities:

- Rizhao, Shandong
- Linyi, Shandong
- Jining, Shandong
- Heze, Shandong
- Kaifeng, Henan

== Exit list ==
Location	km	mi	Exit	Name	Destinations	Notes
G1511 (Rizhao–Lankao Expressway)
Continues east as Yingbin Road towards downtown Rizhao
Donggang District, Rizhao, Shandong	Rizhao Toll Gate					
Donggang District, Rizhao, Shandong	1.96	1.22	1	Rizhao Interchange	G15 – Yantai, Lianyungang	
Donggang District, Rizhao, Shandong				G1815 – Weifang		Under construction
Donggang District, Rizhao, Shandong			22	Xihu	Shandong S222 / Shandong S335 – Wulian, Xihu	
Ju County, Rizhao, Shandong			42	Longshan	Shandong S335 – Longshan	
Ju County, Rizhao, Shandong			59	East Juxian	Shandong S225 (Changling Street) – Juxian	
Ju County, Rizhao, Shandong			69	Juxian	G206 – Juxian, Xiazhuang	
Ju County, Rizhao, Shandong	Juxian Service Area					
Yinan County, Linyi, Shandong			77	Changshen Ridong Interchange	G25 – Dongying, Lianyungang	
Yinan County, Linyi, Shandong			90	Yinan	Shandong S227 – Yinan	
Yinan County, Linyi, Shandong			99	Gaoli	Yixin Highway	
Lanshan District, Linyi, Shandong	113.22	70.35	113	Zhuyuan Interchange	G2 – Tai'an, Linyi	
Fei County, Linyi, Shandong	Feixian Service Area					
Fei County, Linyi, Shandong			142	Feixian	X210 (Guanghua Road) – Feixian, Shangye	
Pingyi County, Linyi, Shandong			160	East Pingyi	G327 – Wenshui, Tongshi	
Pingyi County, Linyi, Shandong			171	Pingyi	Shandong S240 – Pingyi	
Sishui County, Jining, Shandong			195	Quanlin	Shandong S244 – Quanlin	
Sishui County, Jining, Shandong	Sishui Service Area					
Sishui County, Jining, Shandong			211	Sishui	Shandong S611 – Sishui	
Qufu, Jining, Shandong	228.87	142.21	228	Qufu Interchange	G3 – Jinan, Tai'an, Zaozhuang, Xuzhou, Qufu	
Qufu, Jining, Shandong			234	South Qufu	G104 – Qufu, Zoucheng	
Yanzhou District, Jining, Shandong			252	Yanzhou	G327 – Yanzhou, Ningyang	
Yanzhou District, Jining, Shandong	Jining Service Area					
Rencheng District, Jining, Shandong			264	Jining	G237 – Jining	
Rencheng District, Jining, Shandong			276	North Jining	G105 – Jining, Wenshang	
Rencheng District, Jining, Shandong			283	Jining Interchange	Shandong S33 – Jinan, Xuzhou	
Rencheng District, Jining, Shandong			286	West Jining	Shandong S337 – Jining	
Jiaxiang County, Jining, Shandong			293	Jiaxiang	Shandong S252 – Jiaxiang	
Juye County, Heze, Shandong	Juye Service Area					
Juye County, Heze, Shandong	320	200	320	Wangguantun Interchange	G35 / Shandong S21 – Jinan	East end of G35 concurrency S21 under construction
Yuncheng County, Heze, Shandong			323	South Yuncheng	Shandong S254 – Yuncheng, Juye	
Yuncheng County, Heze, Shandong			343	Yuncheng	Shandong S339 – Juancheng, Juye	
Mudan District, Heze, Shandong	Heze Service Area					
Mudan District, Heze, Shandong	367.73	228.50	367	Heze Interchange	G0321 / G35 – Dezhou, Liaocheng, Shangqiu	West end of G35 concurrency
Mudan District, Heze, Shandong	368.02	228.68	368	Caozhou Interchange	Shandong S32 – Heze, Dongming	
Dingtao District, Heze, Shandong			376	Heze New Area	Changjiang E. Road – Heze; Fanyang Road – Dingtao	
Mudan District, Heze, Shandong			387	South Heze	Shandong S259 – Heze, Dingtao	
Mudan District, Heze, Shandong			395	Mudan	Shandong S261 – Heze, Zhangwan	
Mudan District, Heze, Shandong				Shandong S38		Under construction
Mudan District, Heze, Shandong	Caozhou Service Area					
Cao County, Heze, Shandong			414	West Caoxian	G220 / Shandong S350 – Zhuangzhai, Caoxian	
Lankao County, Kaifeng, Henan	Yulu Border Toll Gate					
Lankao County, Kaifeng, Henan	440.98	274.01		Guyang	G106 / G220 – Guyang	
Lankao County, Kaifeng, Henan	Lankao Service Area					
Lankao County, Kaifeng, Henan	453.6	281.9		North Lankao	G106 / G220 – Lankao, Guaying	
Xiangfu District, Kaifeng, Henan			471	West Lankao	G220 / G310 – Lankao, Quxing	
Xiangfu District, Kaifeng, Henan			473 A-B	G30 / Henan S83 – Kaifeng, Zhengzhou, Lankao, Shangqiu, Xuchang		
Continues southwest as Henan S83 towards Xuchang and Nanyang
Closed/former; Concurrency terminus; HOV only; Incomplete access; Tolled; Route transition; Unopened
