= Shanghai–Nanjing Expressway =

Road in China

Shanghai–Nanjing Expressway
- 上海–南京高速公路
- Huning Expressway 沪宁高速公路
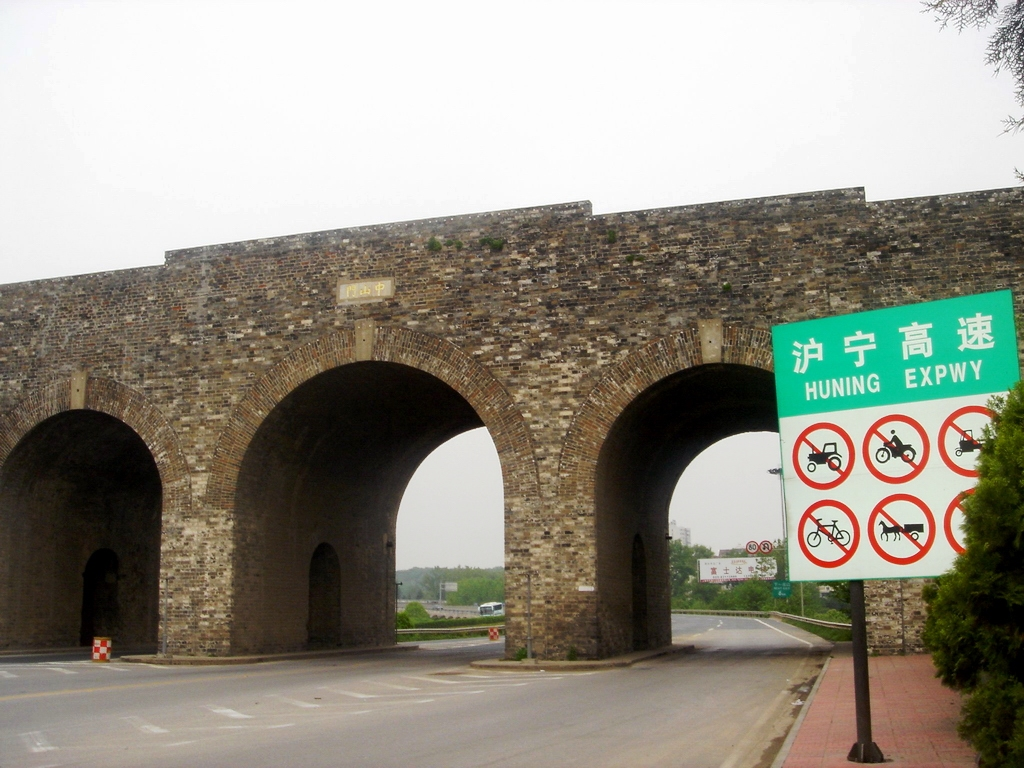
- The Shanghai–Nanjing Expressway terminates at Zhongshan Gate in Nanjing.

Route information
- Existed: 1996–present
- History: 1996–2005: Known as the Shanghai–Nanjing Expressway, designated A11 in Shanghai; 2005–present: Redesignated as the G42 Shanghai–Chengdu Expressway for its entire length and G2 Beijing–Shanghai Expressway between Shanghai and Wuxi
- Component highways: G2 (between Shanghai and Wuxi); G42 (between Shanghai and Maqun Interchange in Nanjing); G42 Connecting Line (between Maqun Interchange and Zhongshan Gate in Nanjing)

Major junctions
- East end: Wuning Road and Daduhe Road, Shanghai
- West end: East Zhongshan Road, Zhongshan Gate Street and Muxuyuan Street, Nanjing

Location
- Country: China

Highway system
- National Trunk Highway System; Primary; Auxiliary

The Shanghai–Nanjing Expressway (simplified Chinese: 沪宁高速公路; traditional Chinese: 滬寧高速公路; pinyin: Hùníng Gāosùgōnglù) is the main expressway between the Chinese cities of Shanghai and Nanjing. It is also the busiest expressway in China. The expressway began construction on June 14, 1992, was completed in February 1996, and opened to traffic November 28, 1996. That year, it was listed as a key national construction project.

As the first highway in Jiangsu province, the Shanghai–Nanjing Expressway has up-to-date charge, monitoring, communications, lighting, safety and service facilities. It has improved transportation in Jiangsu and Shanghai, and encourages development along its length. It was the first expressway in China to use remote traffic monitoring.

== Properties ==
The expressway is a modern, enclosed, four-lane, two-way highway. Each lane is 3.75 metres (12.3 ft) wide, and the highway's roadbed is 26 metres (85 ft) wide. There is a 3-metre (9.8 ft) dividing strip in the center of the highway and a 2.5-metre (8 ft 2 in) emergency parking area on each side of the highway. The speed limit is 120 kilometres per hour (75 mph). It is 274 kilometres (170 miles) in length. It runs from Zhenru, Shanghai to Maqun, Nanjing via Anting, Kunshan, Suzhou, Shuofang (硕放街道), Wuxi, Changzhou, Danyang, Zhenjiang and Jurong. The Shanghai section is 25.87 kilometres (16.07 miles) in length, and the Jiangsu section is 248.21 kilometres (154.23 miles) long. The Zhenjiang section (a branch highway) is 10.25 kilometres (6.37 miles) long. In Shanghai, the highway is coterminous with G2 Beijing–Shanghai Expressway and G42 Shanghai–Chengdu Expressway.

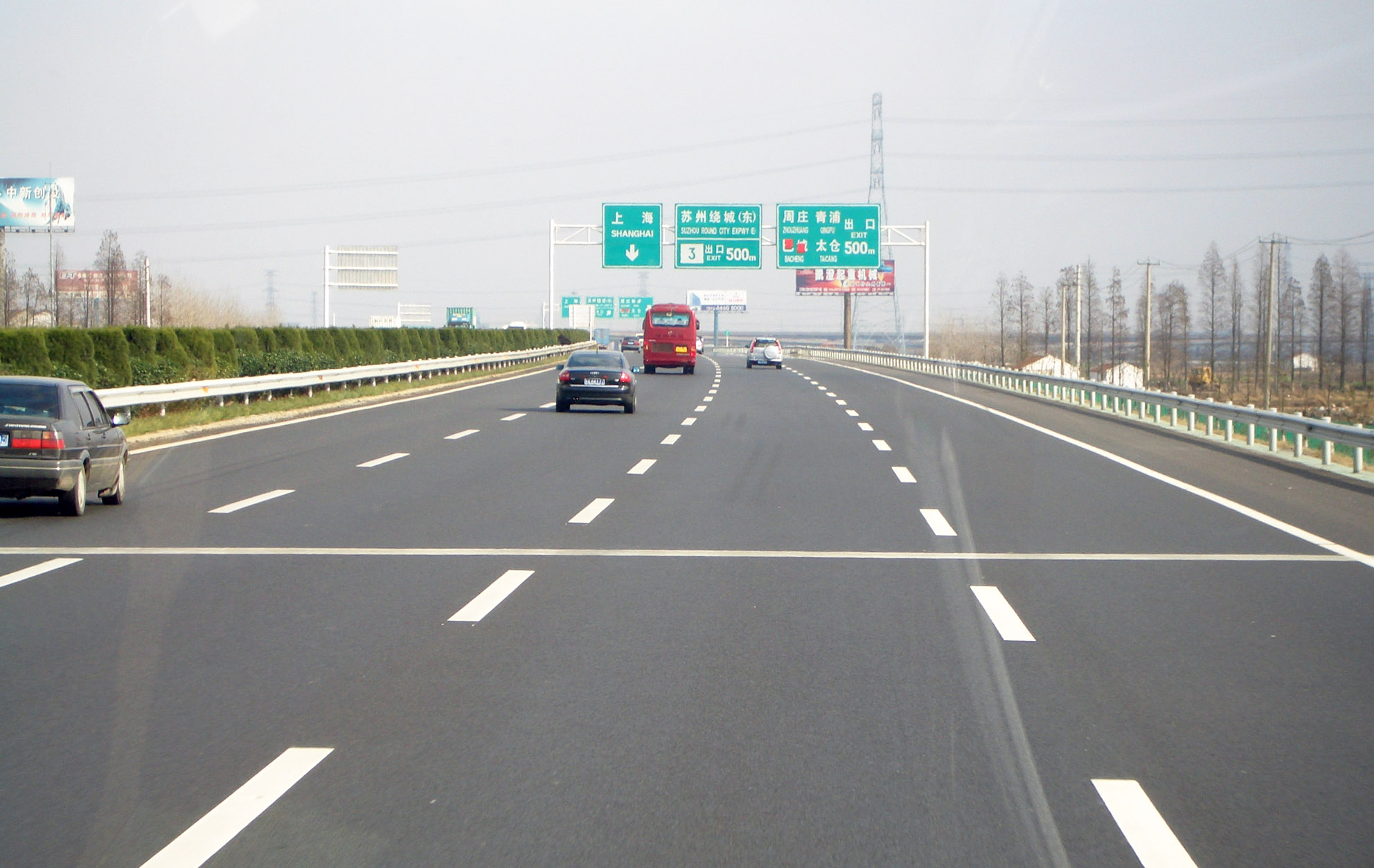
Huning Expressway between Shanghai and Suzhou

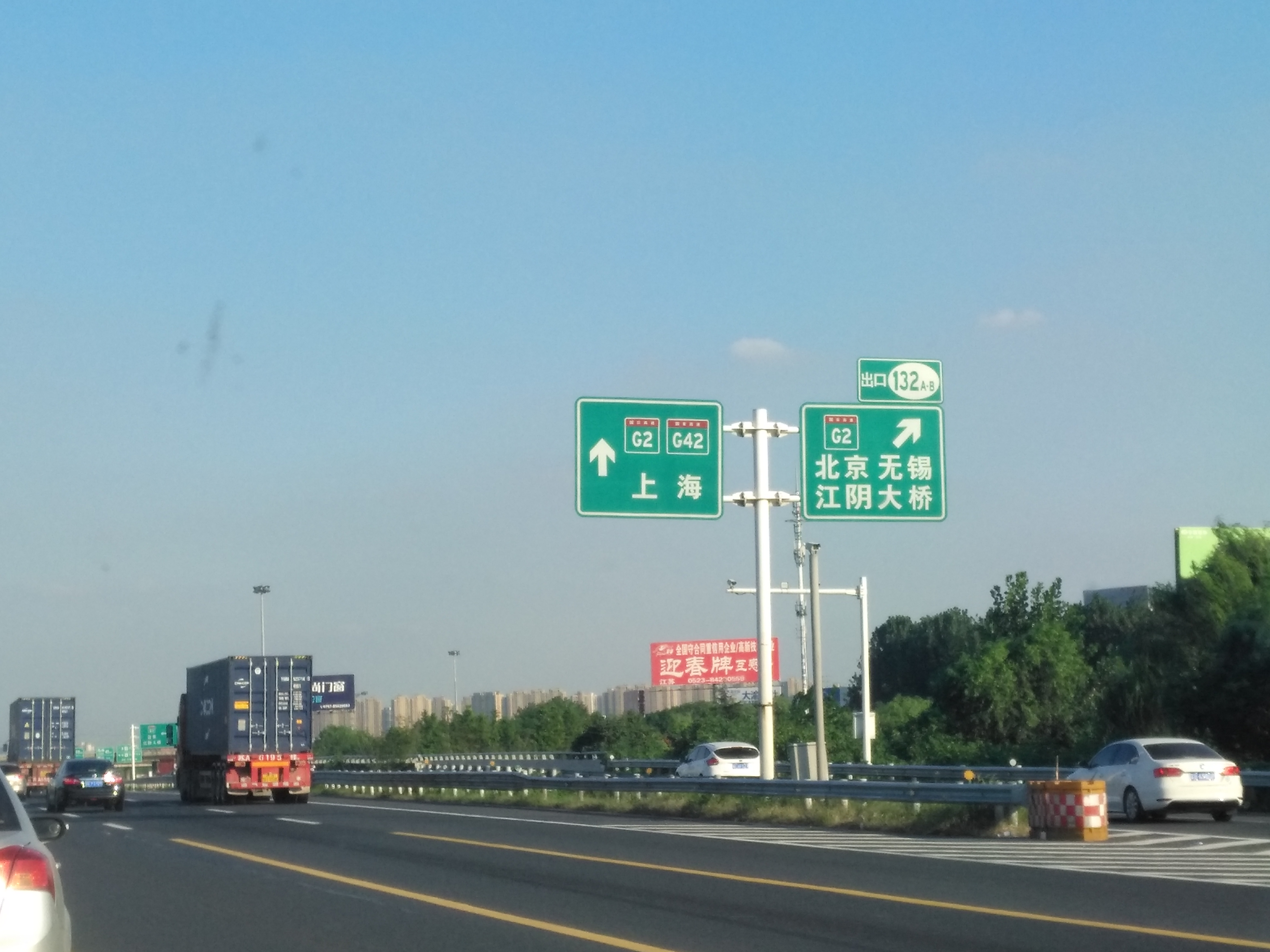
Junction with G2 Beijing–Shanghai Expressway, north of Wuxi
