= G35 =

G35, G-35 or G.35 may refer to:

- Infiniti G35, an automobile
- G35 (chipset), a motherboard chipset manufactured by Intel
- Glock 35, a firearm
- Gudbrandsdalsost, a type of brown cheese popular in Norway
- G35 Jinan–Guangzhou Expressway in China
