= G0211 Tianjin–Shijiazhuang Expressway =

Expressway in Tianjin and Hebei provinces of China

Tianjin–Shijiazhuang Expressway
- 天津－石家庄高速公路
- Jinshi Expressway 津石高速

Route information
- Auxiliary route of G2
- Length: 235 km (146 mi)

Major junctions
- East end: Tianjin
- West end: Shijiazhuang

Location
- Country: China

Highway system
- National Trunk Highway System; Primary; Auxiliary; National Highways; Transport in China
← G2	→ G0212

The Tianjin–Shijiazhuang Expressway (Chinese: 天津石家庄高速公路), designated as G0211 and commonly abbreviated as the Jinshi Expressway (Chinese: 津石高速), is an expressway in northeastern China linking the cities of Tianjin and Shijiazhuang, the capital city of Hebei. This expressway is a branch of G2 Jinghu Expressway.

== Route ==
From East to West
Continues as G25 Changshan Expressway
Currently named as S60 Binshi Expressway	G18 Rongwu Expressway; G25 Changshan Expressway
Currently named as S60 Binshi Expressway	S213 Road; Daqiuzhuang
Currently named as S60 Binshi Expressway	S6 Jincang Expressway
Currently named as S60 Binshi Expressway	G2 Jinghu Expressway; G3 Jingtai Expressway
Currently named as S60 Binshi Expressway	Under Construction
Tianjin City; Hebei Province
	S3 Langcang Expressway
Under Construction
	G45 Daguang Expressway
Concurrent with G45 Daguang Expressway
(452)	S381 Road; Renqiu-Gaoyang
(461)	Pangkou-Gaoyang
Xiyan Service Area
	S0411 Baocang Expressway
Concurrent with G45 Daguang Expressway
	G45 Daguang Expressway
Under Construction
	G2001 Shijiazhuang Ring Expressway
Continues as G2001 Shijiazhuang Ring Expressway
From West to East
