= G35 Jinan–Guangzhou Expressway =

Expressway in China

Jinan–Guangzhou Expressway
- 济南－广州高速公路
- Jiguang Expressway 济广高速公路

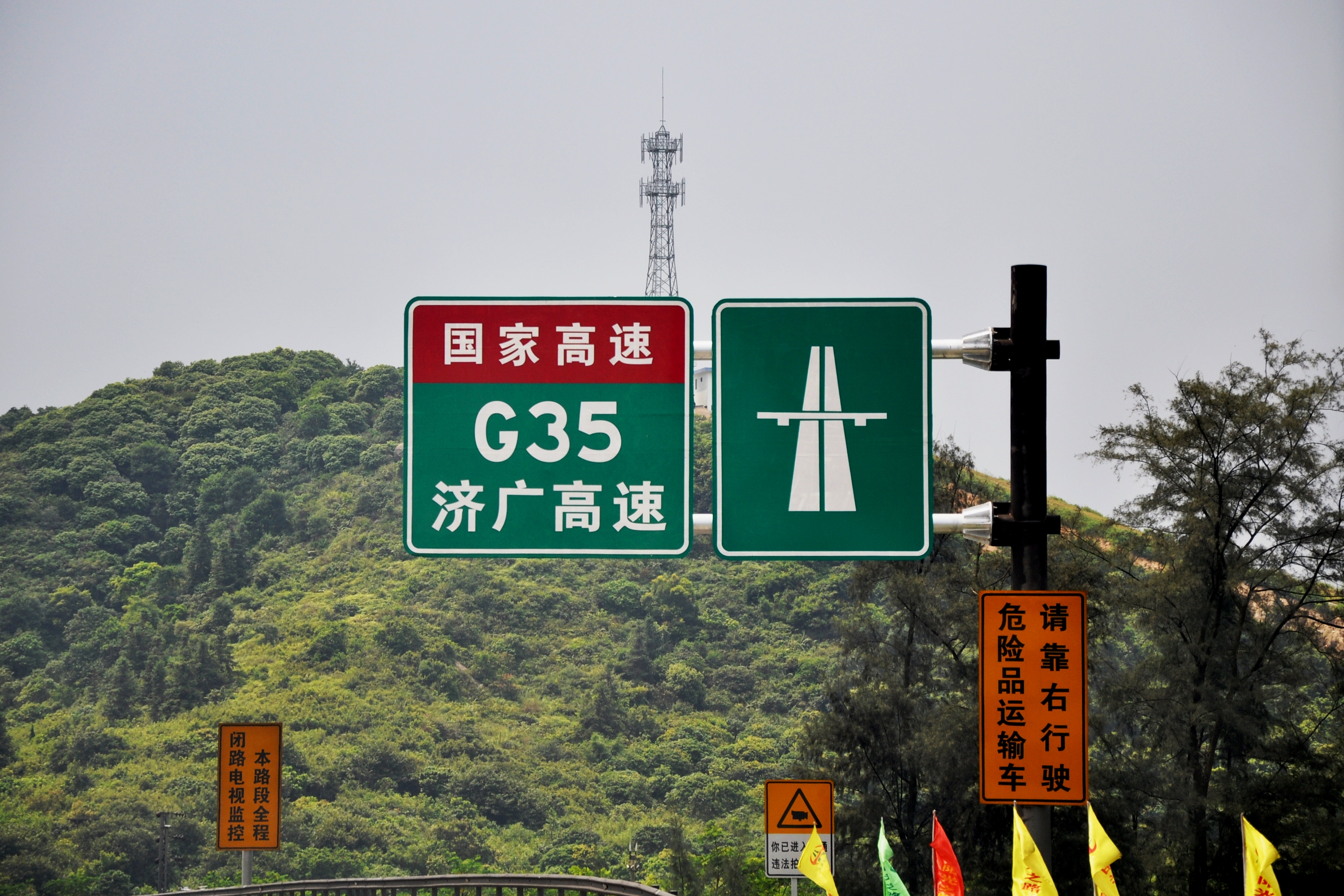
- The Jinan–Guangzhou Expressway at Luogang toll gate, Guangzhou, Guangdong.

Route information
- Length: 1,986 km (1,234 mi) Length when complete.

Major junctions
- North end: G20 in Jinan, Shandong
- G2 in Jinan, Shandong; G3 in Jinan, Shandong; G30 in Shangqiu, Henan; G36 in Bozhou, Anhui; G40 / G42 in Lu'an, Anhui; G50 in Anqing, Anhui; G56 in Jingdezhen, Jiangxi; G60 in Yingtan, Jiangxi; G70 in Fuzhou, Jiangxi; G72 in Ganzhou, Jiangxi; G76 in Ganzhou, Jiangxi; G25 in Meizhou, Guangdong; G25 in Huizhou, Guangdong; G94 in Guangzhou, Guangdong
- South end: G4 / G15 / G1501 in Guangzhou, Guangdong

Location
- Country: China

Highway system
- National Trunk Highway System; Primary; Auxiliary; National Highways; Transport in China
← G3036	→ G3511

The Jinan–Guangzhou Expressway (Chinese: 济南－广州高速公路), designated as G35 and commonly referred to as the Jiguang Expressway (Chinese: 济广高速公路), is an expressway that connects the cities of Jinan, Shandong, China, and Guangzhou, Guangdong. When fully complete, it will be 8,350 km (5,190 mi) in length.

The only section of the expressway that is currently still under construction is in Xingning, Guangdong.

China Expwy G35 sign with name

China Expwy G35 sign no name
