= Nianbadu =

Nianbadu Town
- Town

Chinese transcription(s)
  - Simplified: 廿八都镇
  - Traditional: 廿八都鎮
  - Pinyin: Niànbādū Zhèn
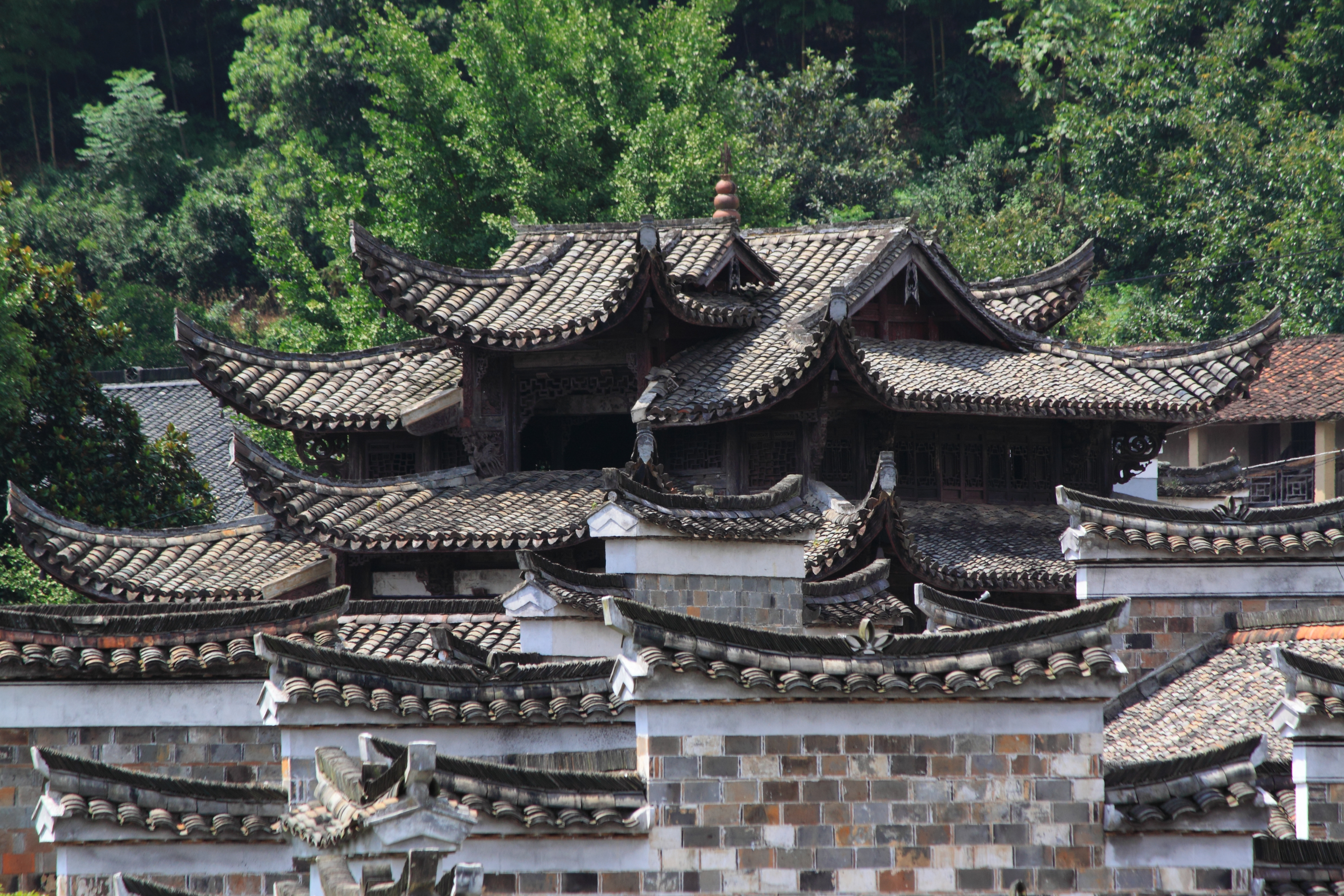
- Wenchang Pavilion in Nianbadu.

- Location in Zhejiang
- Coordinates: 28°17′43.08″N 118°28′43.68″E
- Country: China
- Province: Zhejiang
- Prefecture: Quzhou
- County-level city: Jiangshan

Area
  - Total: 183.37 km^{2} (70.80 sq mi)

Population (2015)
  - Total: 12,541
  - Density: 68.392/km^{2} (177.13/sq mi)
- Time zone: UTC+8 (China Standard)
- Postal code: 324119
- Area code: 0570

Nianbadu (Chinese: 廿八都镇) is a rural town in Jiangshan, Zhejiang, China. As of the 2015 census, it had a population of 12,541 and an area of 183.37-square-kilometre (70.80 sq mi). It is surrounded by Bao'an Township on the north, Songfeng Township and Tongfan Township of Jiangxi on the west, Shuangxikou Township on the east, and Panting Township and Guanlu Township of Fujian on the south. It lies at the junction of the three provinces, namely Zhejiang, Jiangxi and Fujian.

== History ==
Nianbadu was incorporated as a town in 1931. In 1997, it was designated as a historic and cultural towns in Zhejiang by the Zhejiang Provincial Government. In 2007 it was inscribed as a historic and cultural towns in China.

== Administrative division ==
As of 2015, the town is divided into 16 villages: Xunli (浔里村), Huaqiao (花桥村), Fengxi (枫溪村), Wufu (五福村), Xingdun (兴墩村), Lingtou (岭头村), Jianqiang (坚强村), Shanfeng (山峰村), Chongshan (崇山村), Zhangjiashan (张家山村), Linfeng (林丰村), Fuqiang (富强村), Heping (和平村), Xuluo (徐罗村), Zhaojunling (招军岭村) and Gaofeng (高峰).

== Geography ==
The Feng Stream (枫溪) flows through the town.

== Economy ==
The town's economy is based on agricultural resources and tourism.

== Transportation ==
The town is connected to two highways: National Highway G205 and G3 Beijing–Taipei Expressway.

== Tourist attractions ==
The town has 36 Ming and Qing dynasties residential buildings and 11 religious buildings.

== Television ==
The town served as a shooting location for the 2019 CCTV documentary Discover China: Ancient Town in China.

== Gallery ==
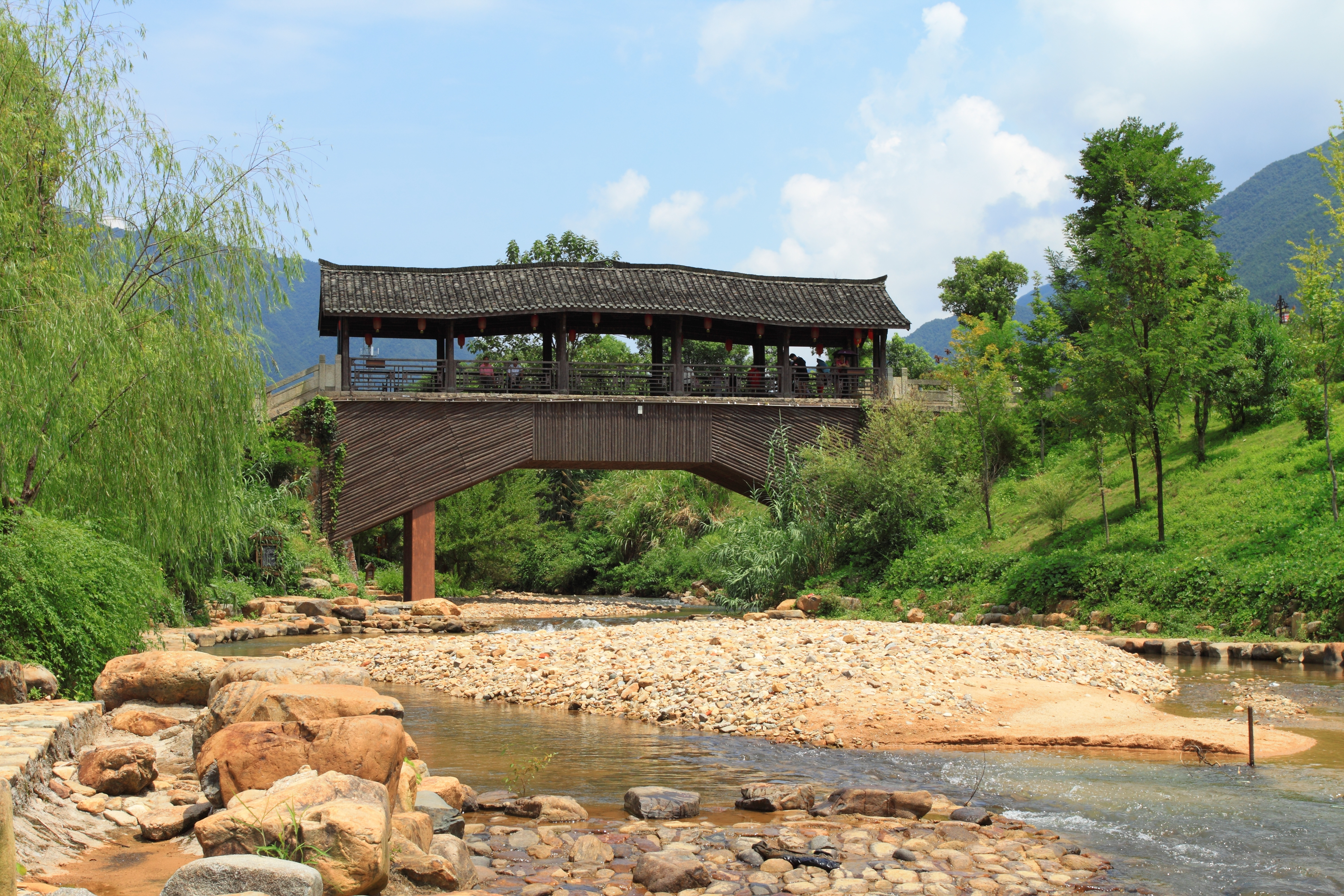
The Bozhu Bridge

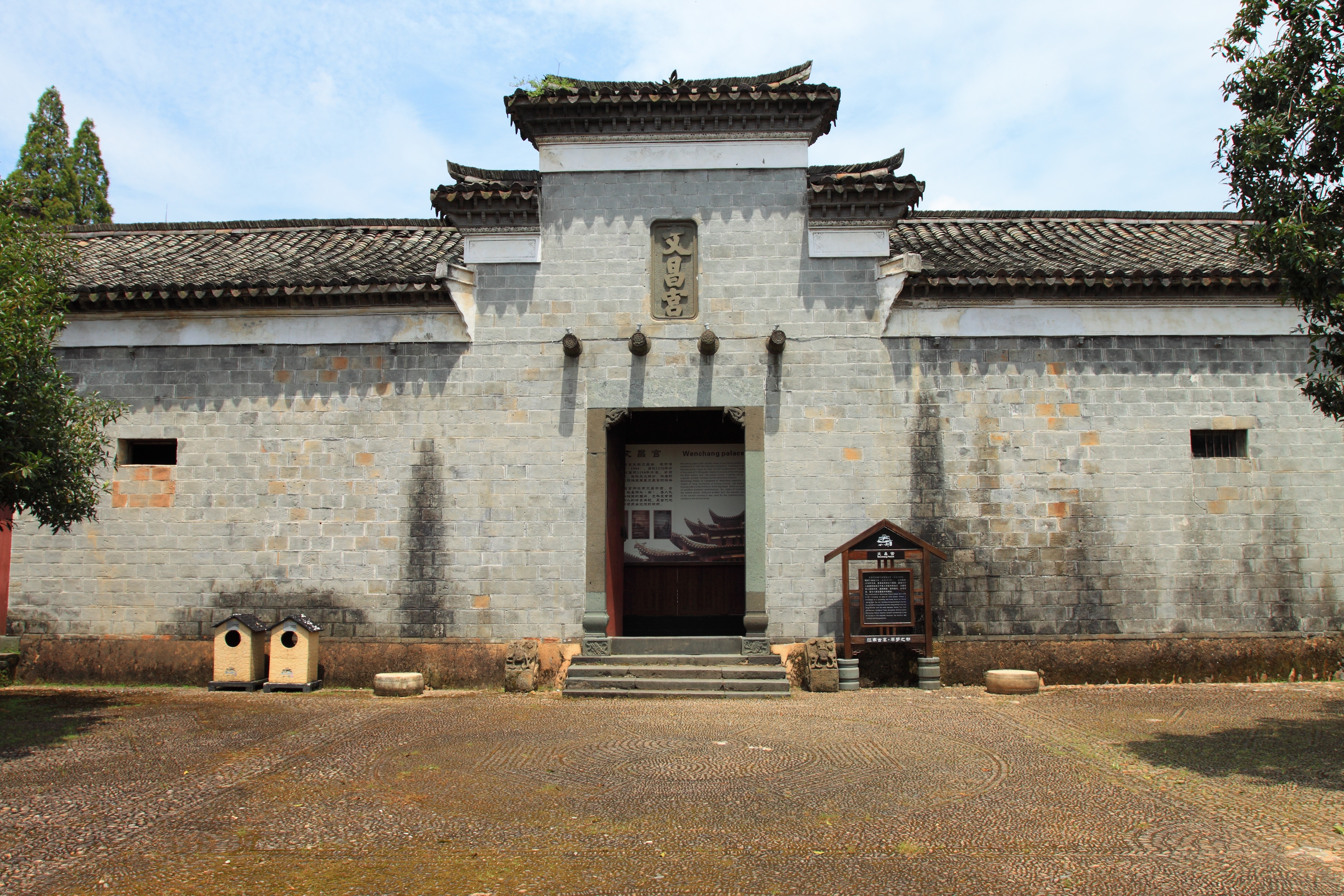
Entrance of Wenchang Pavilion.

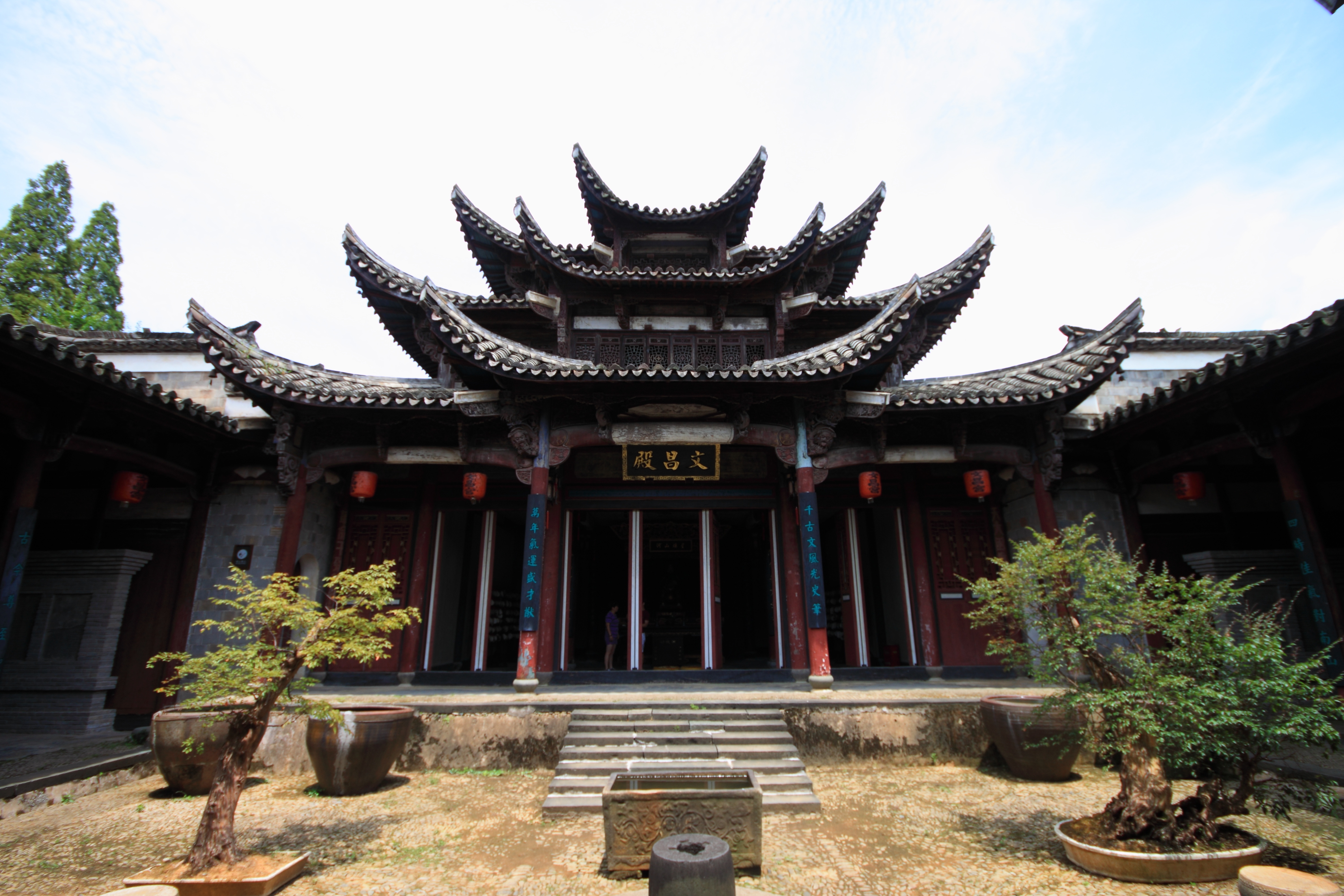
The Wenchang Hall.

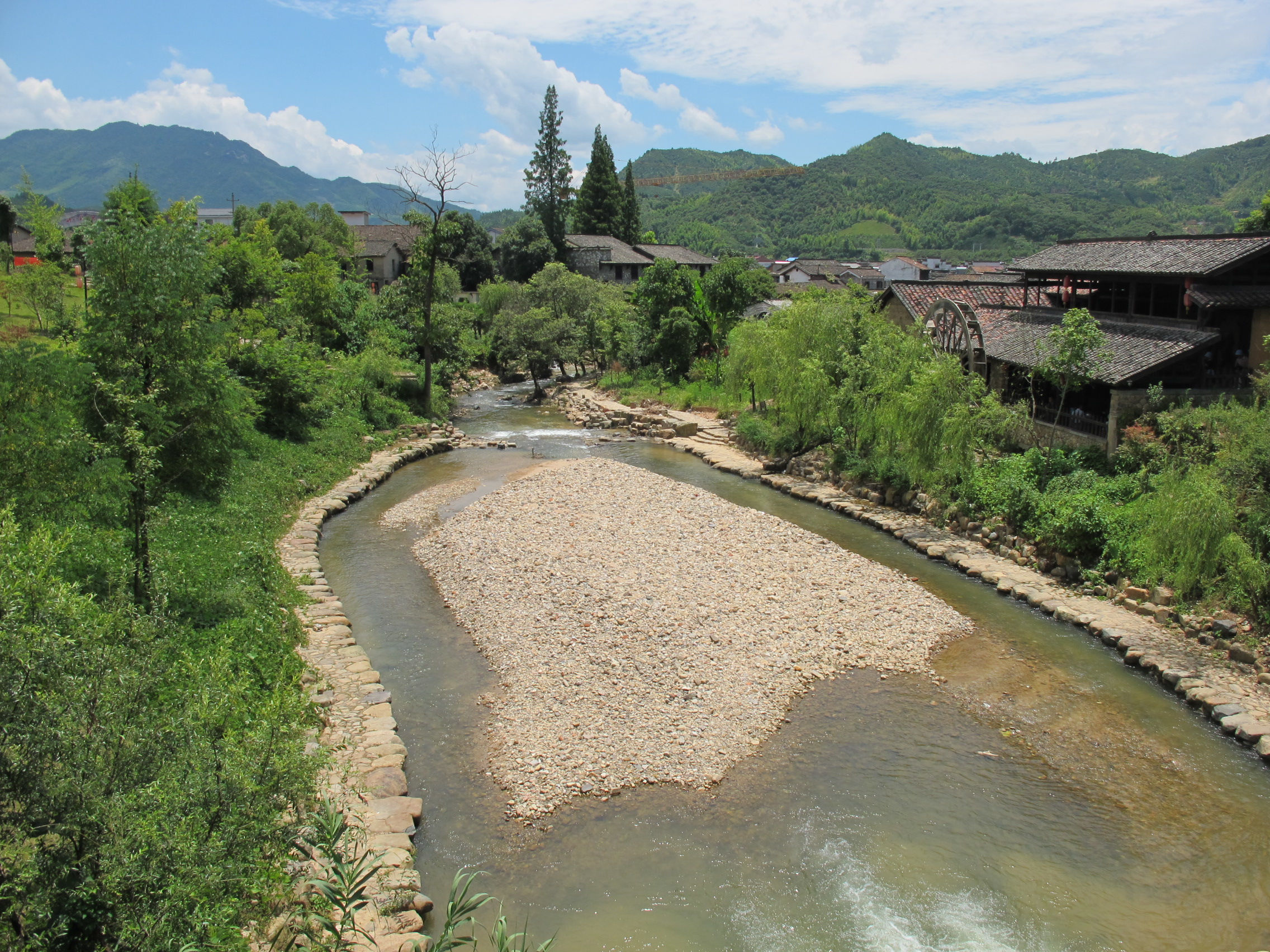
The Feng Stream.
