= Tongling Yangtze River Bridge =

Tongling Yangtze River Bridge 铜陵长江大桥
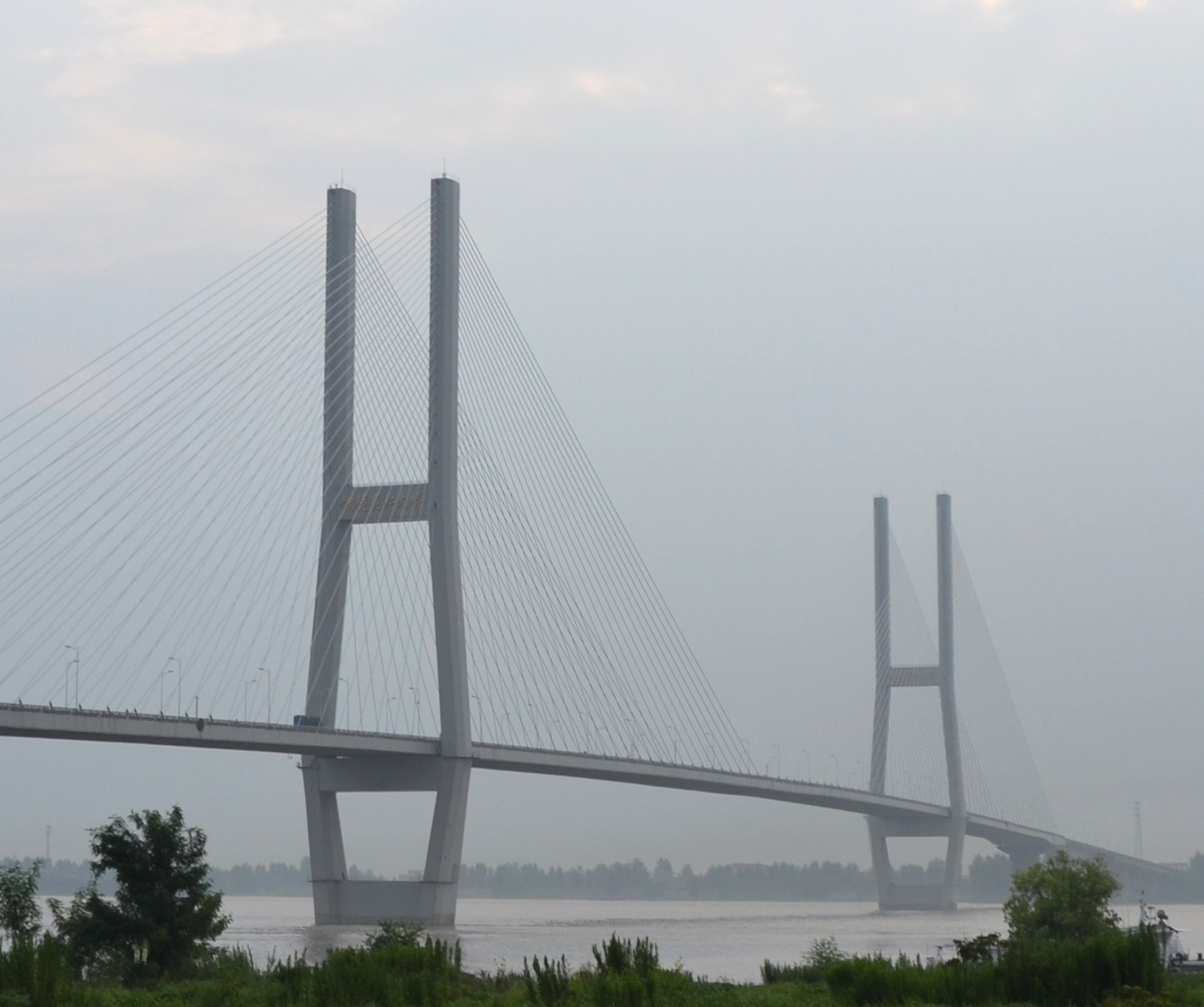
- Coordinates: 30°51′21.6″N 117°43′36.6″E
- Carries: 4 lanes of G3 Beijing–Taipei Expressway
- Crosses: Yangtze River
- Locale: Tongling, Anhui, China

Characteristics
- Design: Cable-stayed
- Material: Reinforced concrete
- Total length: 1,152 metres (3,780 ft)
- Longest span: 432 metres (1,417 ft)

History
- Construction start: 1991
- Construction end: 1995

Location
- Interactive map of Tongling Yangtze River Bridge

Tongling Yangtze River Bridge is a cable-stayed bridge near Tongling, Anhui, China. The bridge spans 432 metres (1,417 ft) over the Yangtze River. The bridge carries four lanes of the G3 Beijing–Taipei Expressway.

== See also ==
- List of largest cable-stayed bridges
- Yangtze River bridges and tunnels
