= G2516 Dongying–Lüliang Expressway =

Expressway in China

Dongying–Lüliang Expressway
- 东营－吕梁高速公路
- Donglü Expressway 东吕高速公路

Route information
- Auxiliary route of G25

Major junctions
- West end: G20 in Lishi District, Lüliang, Shanxi
- East end: G18 / Shandong S7201 in Lijin County, Dongying, Shandong

Location
- Country: China

Highway system
- National Trunk Highway System; Primary; Auxiliary; National Highways; Transport in China
← G2515	→ G2517

The G2516 Dongying–Lüliang Expressway (Chinese: 东营—吕梁高速公路), also referred to as the Donglü Expressway (Chinese: 东吕高速公路), is an expressway in China that connects the cities of Dongying, Shandong and Lüliang, Shanxi.

== Route ==
The expressway starts in Dongying, Shandong, and passes through Binzhou, Jinan, Gaotang, Weixian, Xingtai, Zuoquan, Yushe, Pingyao, and ends in Lüliang, Shanxi. The route passes through the provinces of Hebei, Shandong and Shanxi.
