= Baixia, Nanjing =

Former district of Nanjing, Jiangsu, China

Coordinates: 32.0136°N 118.802°E

Baixia 白下区
- District of the People's Republic of China
- 1955–2013
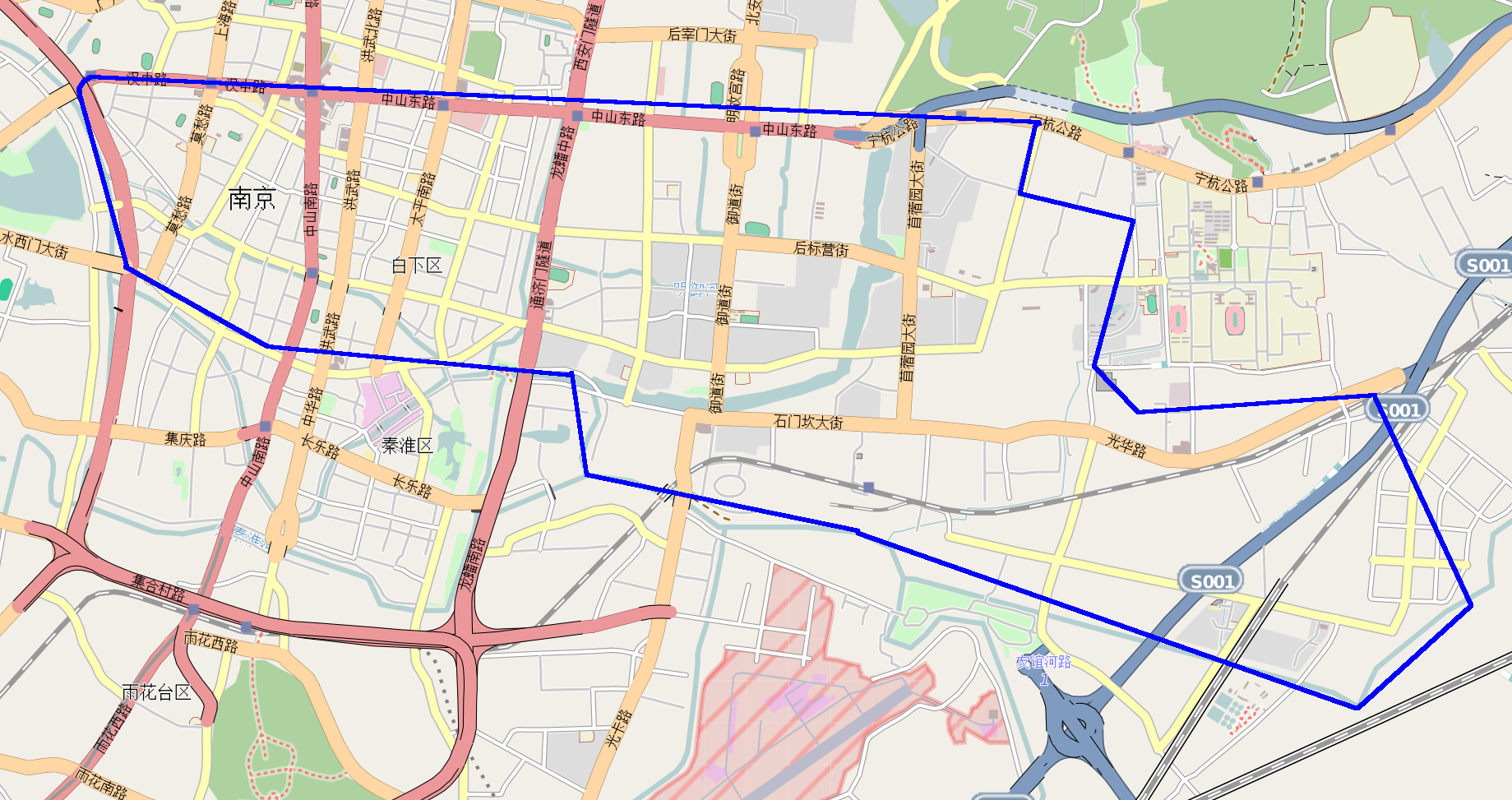
- Location of Baixia in Nanjing
- History
  - Established: 1955
  - Disestablished: 2013
Succeeded by
Qinhuai District
- Today part of: Part of the Qinhuai District, Nanjing

Baixia (Chinese: 白下; pinyin: Báixià) was a district of Nanjing, the capital of Jiangsu Province, People's Republic of China. It has a population of 530,000 (2011) and a land area of 35 square kilometres (14 sq mi). By the side of Qinhuai River, Baixia District has a long history and culture. It is one of the downtown areas of Nanjing and has convenient transportation and economic prosperity. After infrastructure improvement, the area has become an elegant living environment furnishing full communication and functional information network capacity.

== Administrative subdivisions ==
Baixia District administers nine subdistricts. They are Wulaocun Subdivision, Jiankang Road Subdivision, Hongwu Road Subdivision, Daguang Road Subdivision, Ruijin Road Subdivision, Muxuyuan Subdivision, Guanghua Road Subdivision., Chaotian Palace Subdivision. and Zhimaying Subdivision. The People's Government of Baixia District is located in Hongwu Road Subdivision.
