= G4011 Yangzhou–Liyang Expressway =

Expressway in China

Yangzhou–Liyang Expressway
- 扬州－溧阳高速公路
- Yangli Expressway 扬溧高速公路
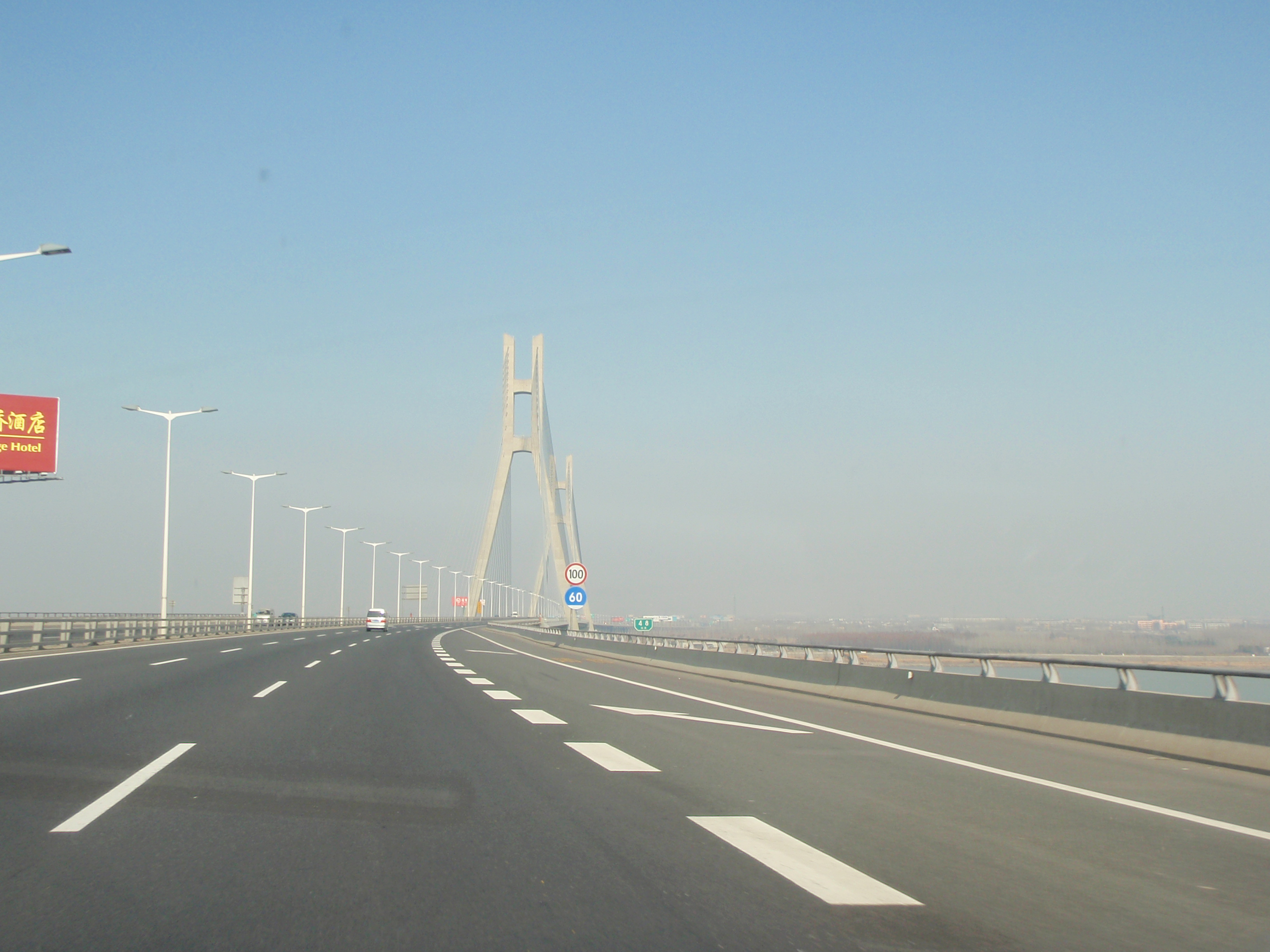
- G4011 Expressway on the North Runyang Yangtze River Bridge

Route information
- Auxiliary route of G40

Major junctions
- North end: G40 / Jiangsu S28 in Yangzhou, Jiangsu
- South end: G25 in Liyang, Changzhou, Jiangsu

Location
- Country: China

Highway system
- National Trunk Highway System; Primary; Auxiliary; National Highways; Transport in China
← G4001	→ G4012

The G4011 Yangzhou–Liyang Expressway (Chinese: 扬州—溧阳高速公路), commonly referred to as the Yangli Expressway (Chinese: 扬溧高速公路), is an expressway in China that connects Yangzhou, Jiangsu and Liyang, Jiangsu. It is a spur of G40 Shanghai–Xi'an Expressway and is completely in Jiangsu Province.

It passes through the following cities, all of which are in Jiangsu:

- Yangzhou
- Zhenjiang
- Jintan, Changzhou
- Liyang, Changzhou

The expressway crosses the Yangtze over the Runyang Yangtze River Bridge.
