= G2513 Huai'an–Xuzhou Expressway =

Road in China

Huai'an–Xuzhou Expressway
- 淮安－徐州高速公路
- Huaixu Expressway 淮徐高速公路

Route information
- Auxiliary route of G25

Major junctions
- East end: G2 / Jiangsu S18 in Huai'an
- G25 in Huai'an; Jiangsu S49 in Suqian; G30 in Xuzhou
- West end: G3 in Xuzhou

Location
- Country: China

Highway system
- National Trunk Highway System; Primary; Auxiliary; National Highways; Transport in China
← G2512	→ G2515

The G2513 Huai'an–Xuzhou Expressway (Chinese: 淮安—徐州高速公路), commonly referred to as the Huaixu Expressway (Chinese: 淮徐高速公路), is an expressway in China that connects the cities of Huai'an, Jiangsu, and Xuzhou, Jiangsu. The expressway is a spur of G25 Changchun–Shenzhen Expressway and is entirely in Jiangsu Province.

It passes through the following cities, all of which are in Jiangsu Province:

- Huai'an
- Suqian
- Xuzhou
