= China National Highway 205 =

Road in China

National Highway 205
- 205国道

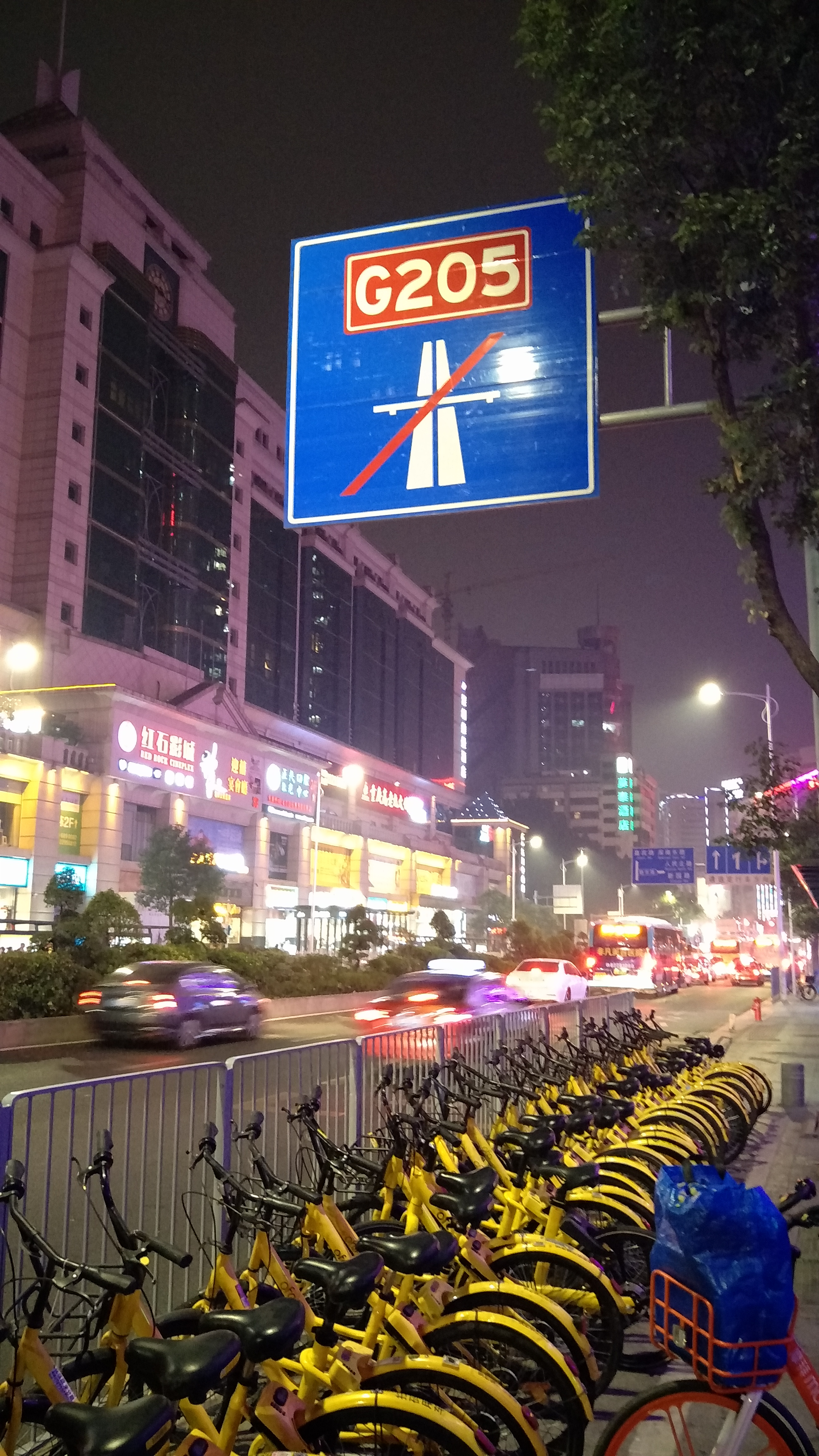

Route information
- Length: 3,160 km (1,960 mi)

Major junctions
- From: Shanhaiguan, Hebei
- To: Shenzhen, Guangdong

Location
- Country: China

Highway system
- National Trunk Highway System; Primary; Auxiliary
← G204	→ G206

China National Highway 205 (G205) runs from Shanhaiguan, Hebei Province to Shenzhen, Guangdong Province in China. It is 3,160 kilometres in length and runs south from Shanhaiguan towards Tianjin, Hebei, Shandong, Jiangsu, Anhui, Zhejiang, Fujian, and ends in Guangdong Province.

== Route and distance ==
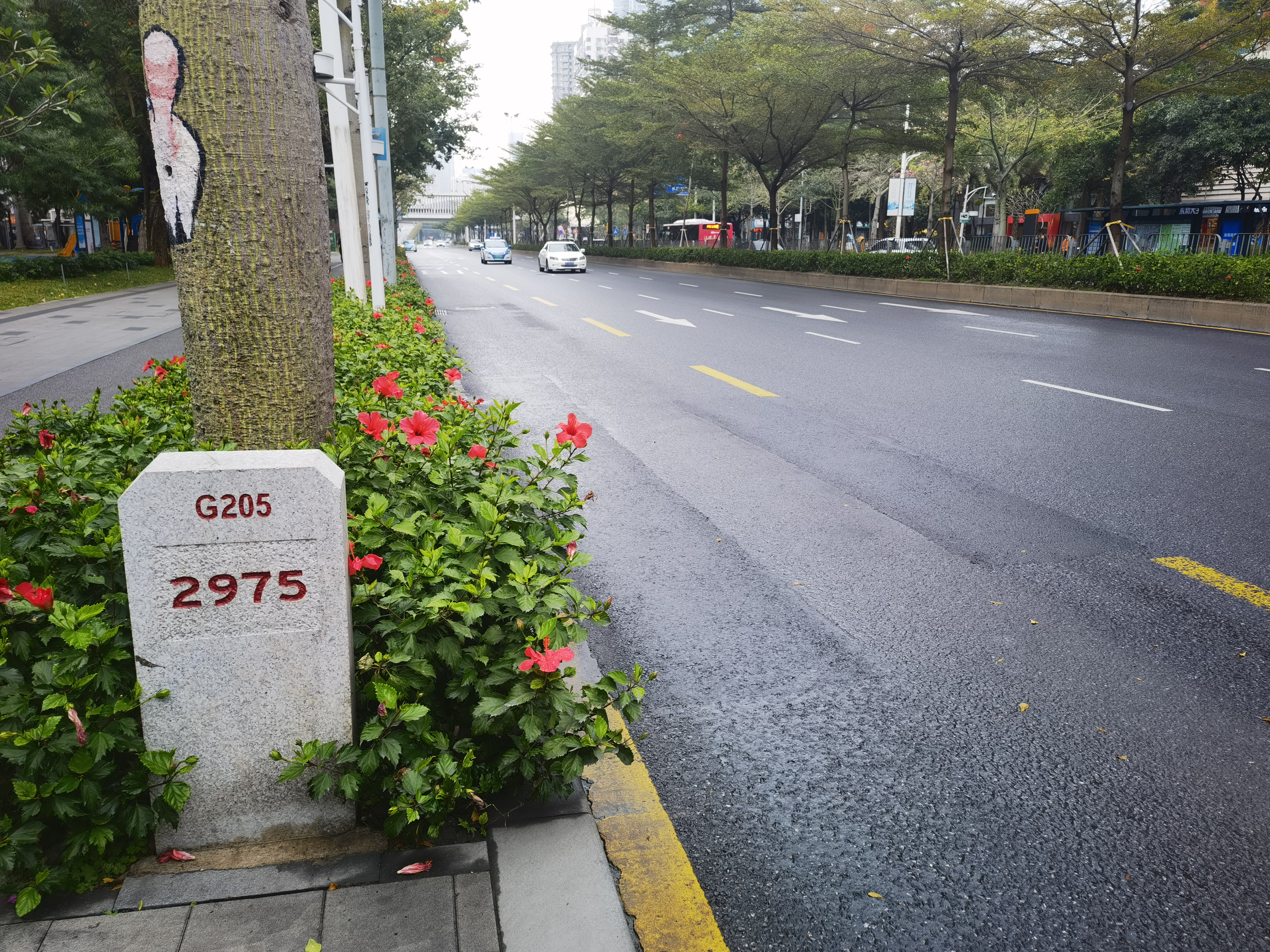
National Highway 205, milestone at 2975km

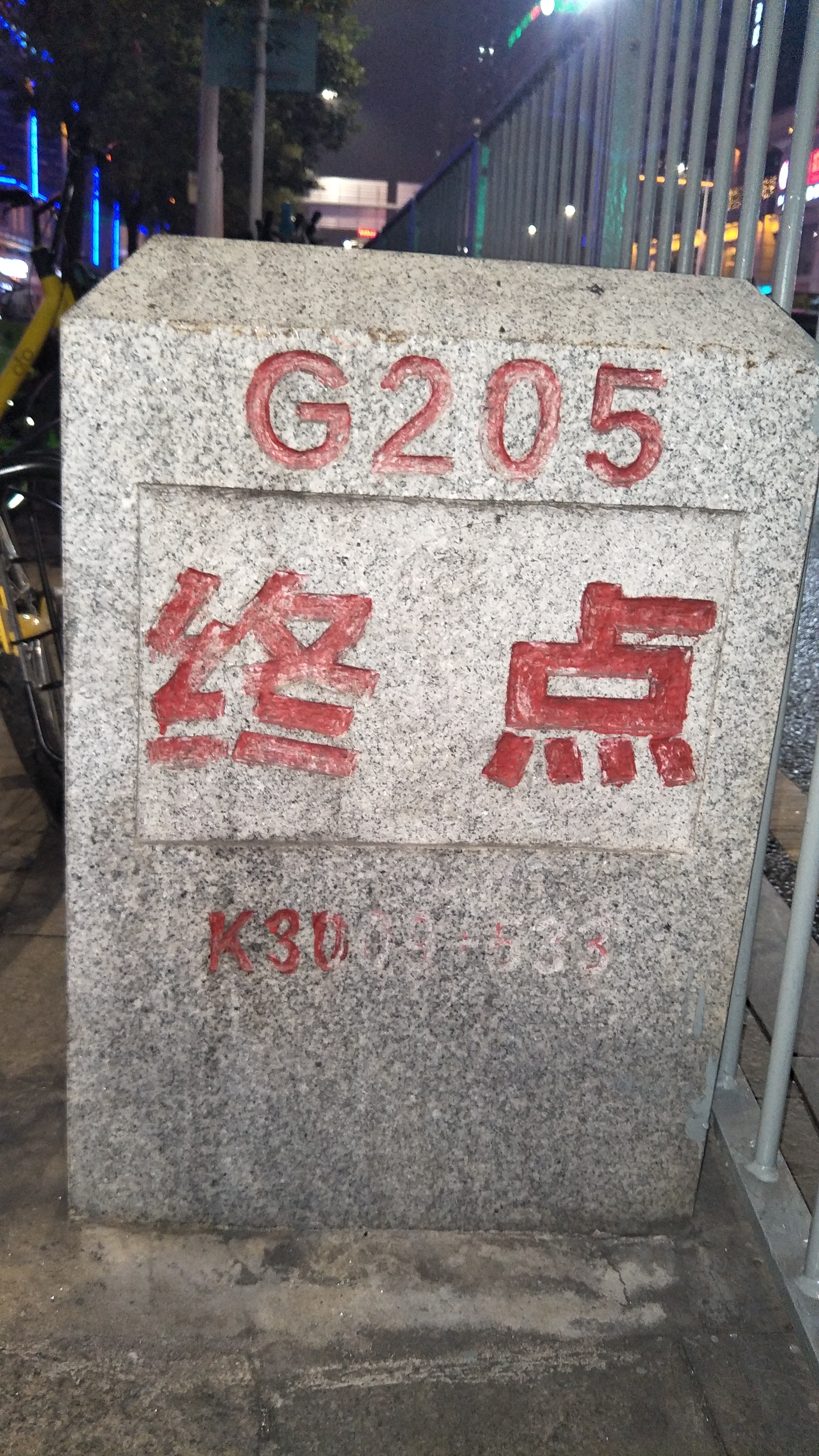
Milestone at the end of National Highway 205 at Sai Bu Junction, East Gate, Shenzhen

Route and distance

City	Distance (km)
Shanhaiguan, Hebei	0
Qinhuangdao, Hebei	21
Changli, Hebei	69
Luan County, Hebei	111
Guye, Hebei	139
Tangshan, Hebei	170
Fengnan, Hebei	187
Ninghe, Tianjin	225
Beichen, Tianjin	296
Huanghua, Hebei	418
Yanshan, Hebei	458
Qingyun, Shandong	497
Wudi, Shandong	523
Binzhou, Shandong	592
Boxing County, Shandong	621
Huantai, Shandong	645
Zibo, Shandong	669
Zichuan, Shandong	688
Boshan, Shandong	709
Laiwu, Shandong	753
Xintai, Shandong	796
Mengyin, Shandong	824
Linyi, Shandong	916
Tancheng, Shandong	972
Xinyi, Jiangsu	1001
Shuyang, Jiangsu	1051
Huaiyin, Jiangsu	1115
Huai'an, Jiangsu	1119
Hongze, Jiangsu	1161
Liuhe, Jiangsu	1169
Nanjing, Jiangsu	1313
Ma'anshan, Anhui	1360
Dangtu, Anhui	1379
Wuhu, Anhui	1411
Nanling, Anhui	1469
Jing County, Anhui	1504
Huangshan, Anhui	1692
Kaihua, Zhejiang	1808
Changshan, Zhejiang	1856
Jiangshan, Zhejiang	1888
Pucheng, Fujian	2018
Jianyang, Fujian	2138
Jian'ou, Fujian	2188
Nanping, Fujian	2262
Sha County, Fujian	2318
Sanming, Fujian	2343
Yong'an, Fujian	2399
Shanghang, Fujian	2605
Jiaoling, Guangdong	2682
Meizhou, Guangdong	2728
Mei County, Guangdong	2736
Xingning, Guangdong	2785
Longchuan, Guangdong	2848
Dongyuan, Guangdong	2937
Heyuan, Guangdong	2955
Huizhou, Guangdong	3094
Shenzhen, Guangdong	3160

== See also ==
- China National Highways
