= G4001 Hefei Ring Expressway =

Orbital road in Anhui, China

Hefei Ring Expressway
- 合肥绕城高速公路

Route information
- Length: 105 km (65 mi)
- Existed: 2008–present

Location
- Country: China

Highway system
- National Trunk Highway System; Primary; Auxiliary; National Highways; Transport in China
← G40	→ G4011

The G4001 Hefei Ring Expressway (Chinese: 合肥绕城高速公路) is a ring expressway around the main urban area of Hefei, Anhui, China. The expressway was fully opened to traffic on 28 October 2008 and is currently a toll road.
