= China National Highway 220 =

Road in China

National Highway 220
- 220国道

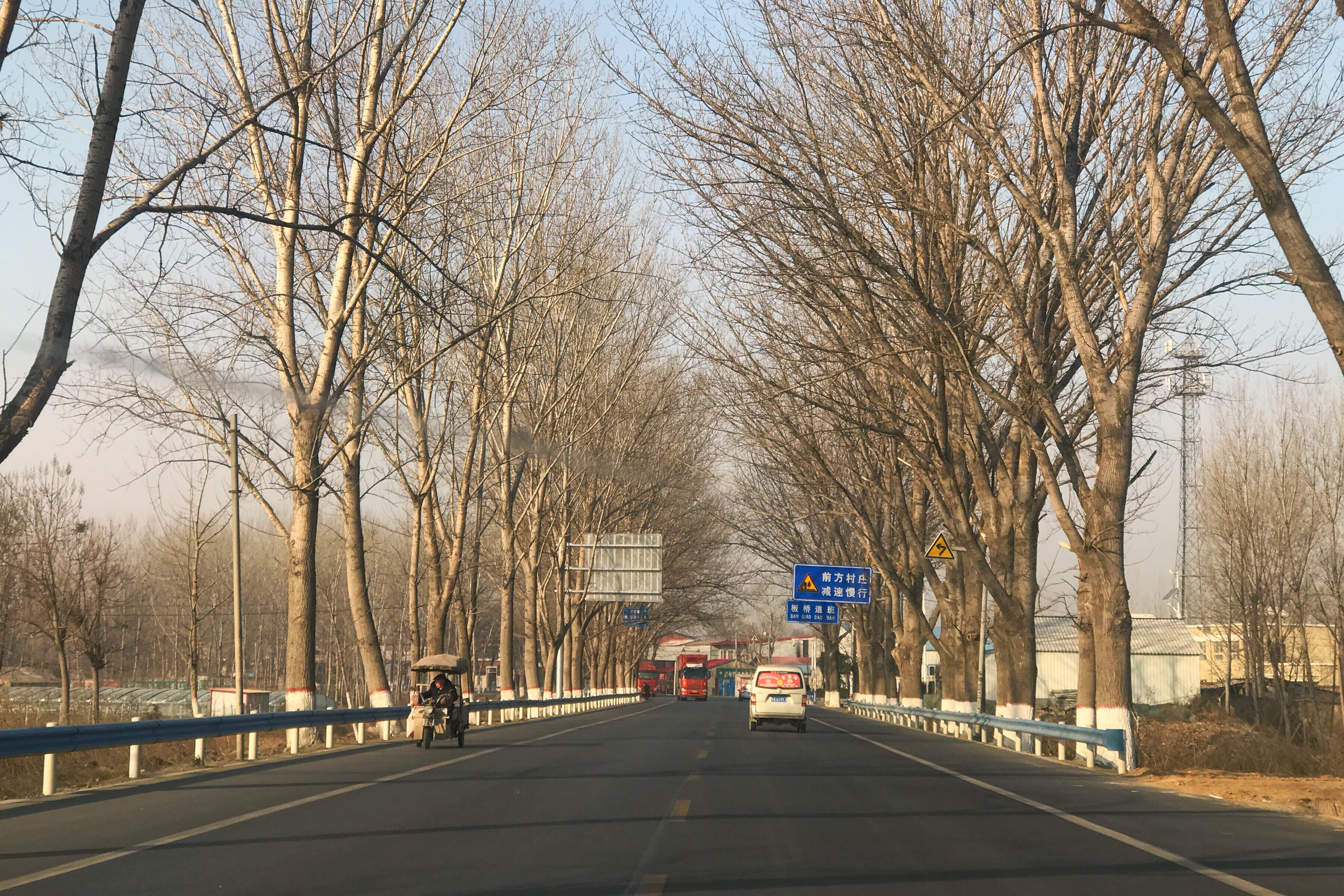
- The highway near Kaifeng, Henan

Route information
- Length: 585 km (364 mi)

Major junctions
- From: Binzhou, Shandong
- To: Zhengzhou, Henan

Location
- Country: China

Highway system
- National Trunk Highway System; Primary; Auxiliary
| ← G219 | → G221 |

China National Highway 220 (Chinese: 220国道) runs from Binzhou, Shandong to Zhengzhou, Henan. It is 585 kilometres in length and runs southwest from Binzhou towards Zhengzhou.

== Route and distance ==
Route and distance

| City | Distance (km) |
|---|---|
| Binzhou, Shandong | 0 |
| Jiyang, Shandong | 90 |
| Madian, Shandong | 125 |
| Jinan, Shandong | 140 |
| Changqing, Shandong | 175 |
| Pingyin, Shandong | 223 |
| Liangshan, Shandong | 296 |
| Yuncheng County, Shandong | 328 |
| Heze, Shandong | 386 |
| Lankao, Henan | 467 |
| Kaifeng, Henan | 515 |
| Zhongmou, Henan | 547 |
| Zhengzhou, Henan | 585 |

== See also ==
- China National Highways
