= G18 Rongcheng–Wuhai Expressway =

Road in China

Rongcheng–Wuhai Expressway
- 荣成－乌海高速公路
- Rongwu Expressway 荣乌高速公路

Route information
- Length: 1,820 km (1,130 mi) Length when complete.

Major junctions
- East end: Rongcheng, Shandong (when complete); Shandong S203 (Shichang Avenue) in Weihai, Shandong (current)
- West end: Wuhai, Inner Mongolia (when complete); G109 in Otog Banner, Ordos City, Inner Mongolia (current)

Location
- Country: China

Highway system
- National Trunk Highway System; Primary; Auxiliary; National Highways; Transport in China
← G1612	→ G1811

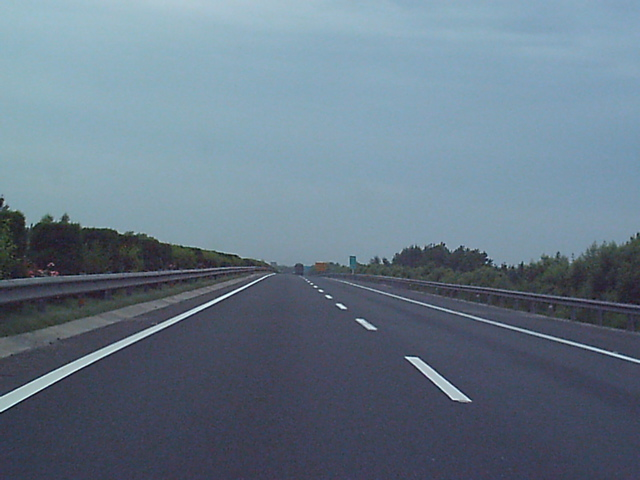
Baojin Expressway in July 2004

The Rongcheng–Wuhai Expressway (Chinese: 荣成—乌海高速公路), designated as G18 and commonly referred to as the Rongwu Expressway (Chinese: 荣乌高速公路), is an expressway that connects the cities of Rongcheng, Shandong, China, and Wuhai, Inner Mongolia. When fully complete, it will be 1,820 km (1,130 mi) in length.

The expressway is complete from Weihai, Shandong to Bazhou, Hebei.

The Baojin Expressway (Chinese: 保津高速公路; pinyin: Bǎojīn Gāosùgōnglù) is a highway in north China, linking Baoding in Hebei province with Tianjin municipality. The expressway was first built in 1995 and opened to the general motoring public in mid-December 1999. It links Baoding, Xushui, Rongcheng and heads east toward Tianjin, linking Xiongxian and Bazhou. The 129 km-long expressway is designed for a speed that, as of May 2004, is the maximum speed legally tolerated on PRC expressways—120 km/h. (The Tianjin part, though, has a lower speed limit of 110 km/h.) The western part links with the Jingshi Expressway 118 kilometres after its starting point from Beijing's 3rd Ring Road at Liuliqiao. It is not far away from the city of Baoding. The eastern end links with the Waihuan (Outer Ring) Road in Tianjin, which links to other expressways in the region, such as the Jingjintang Expressway to Beijing and Tanggu, and the Jinghu Expressway to Shanghai. Three service areas exist along the expressway.

The expressway from Jungar Banner to Qipanjing Town in Otog Banner, entirely in Ordos City, Inner Mongolia.
