= G70 Fuzhou–Yinchuan Expressway =

Road in China

Fuzhou–Yinchuan Expressway
- 福州－银川高速公路
- Fuyin Expressway 福银高速公路

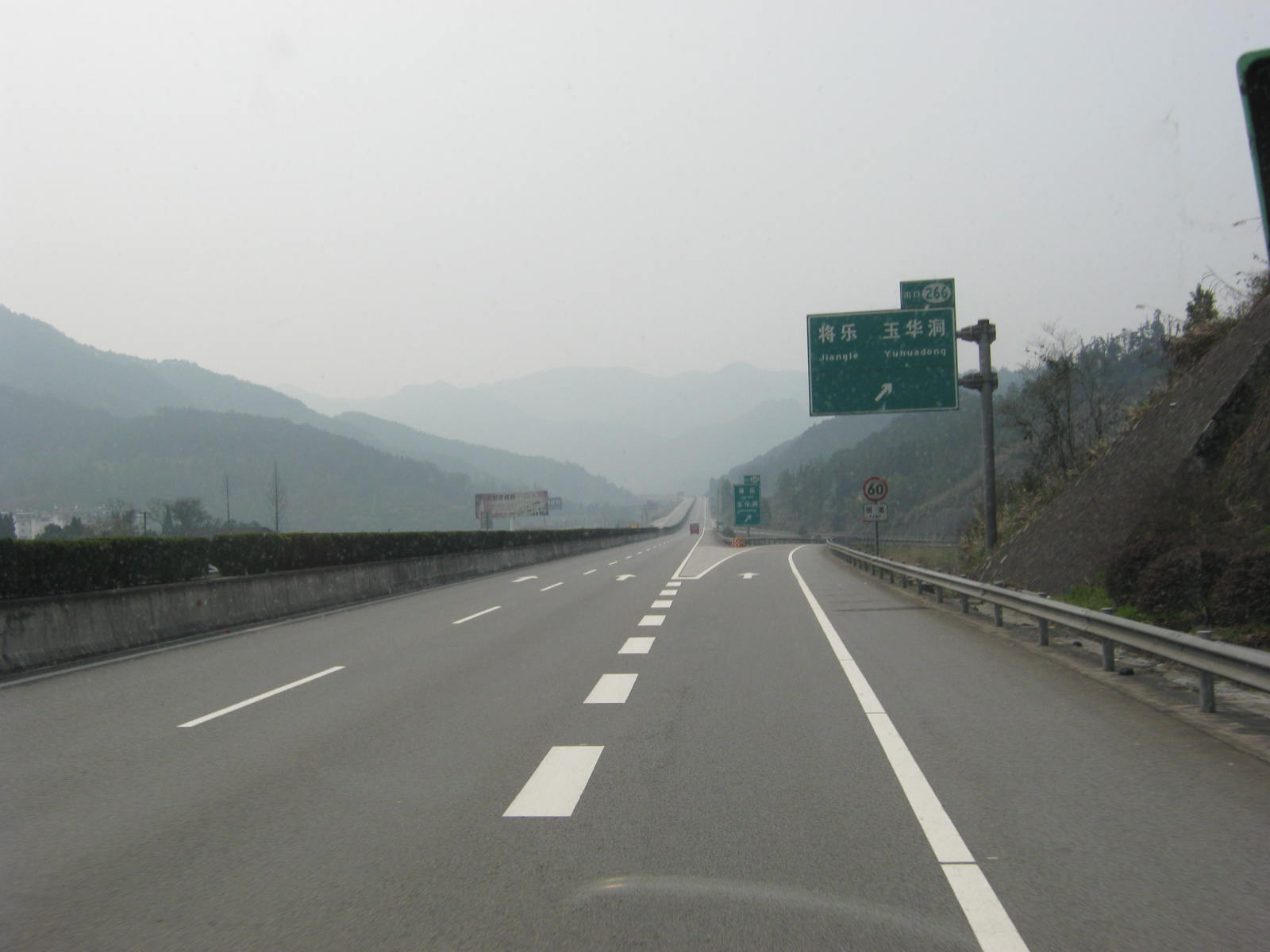

Route information
- Length: 2,397.55 km (1,489.77 mi)

Major junctions
- Southeast end: G15 Shenyang–Haikou Expressway, Minhou County, Fuzhou, Fujian
- Northwest end: G20 Qingdao–Yinchuan Expressway and China National Highway 211, Yinchuan, Ningxia

Location
- Country: China

Highway system
- National Trunk Highway System; Primary; Auxiliary; National Highways; Transport in China
← G6911	→ G7011

The Fuzhou–Yinchuan Expressway (Chinese: 福州—银川高速公路), designated as G70 and commonly referred to as the Fuyin Expressway (Chinese: 福银高速公路) is an expressway that connects China's cities of Fuzhou in Fujian province and Yinchuan in Ningxia province. It is 2,397.55 km (1,489.77 mi) in length.

The expressway was completed with the opening of the Jiujiang Yangtze River Expressway Bridge. Previously, expressway traffic was rerouted over the Jiujiang Bridge that also carried local traffic on China National Highway 105.

In Ningxia, it is an important north-south route between Yinchuan and Guyuan.
