= G40 Shanghai–Xi'an Expressway =

Motorway across China

Shanghai–Xi'an Expressway
- 上海－西安高速公路
- Hushaan Expressway 沪陕高速公路

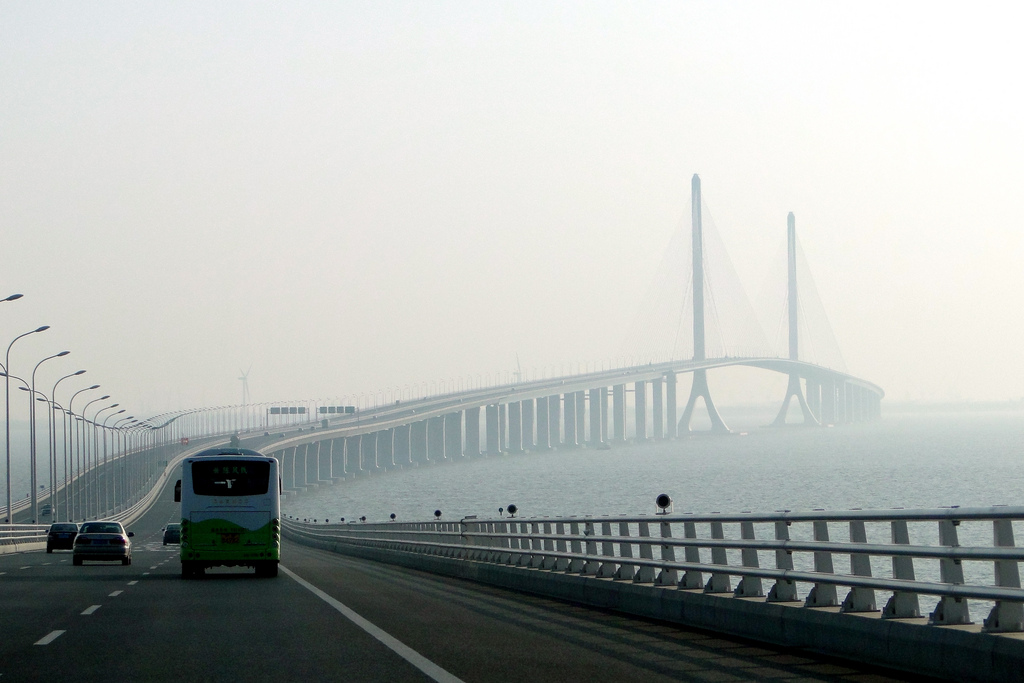
- The Shanghai Yangtze River Bridge carries 6 lanes of the Shanghai–Xi'an Expressway.

Route information
- Part of AH5
- Length: 1,526 km (948 mi)

Major junctions
- East end: G1503 in Shanghai
- West end: G70 / G3001 in Xi'an, Shaanxi

Location
- Country: China

Highway system
- National Trunk Highway System; Primary; Auxiliary; National Highways; Transport in China
← G3615	→ G4001

The Shanghai–Xi'an Expressway (Chinese: 上海—西安高速公路), designated as G40 and commonly referred to as the Hushaan Expressway (Chinese: 沪陕高速公路) is an expressway that connects the cities of Shanghai and Xi'an, Shaanxi. It is 1,490 km (930 mi) in length.

The expressway was completed after Chongqi Bridge opened to commercial traffic on December 24, 2011.

The expressway uses the Shanghai Yangtze River Tunnel and Bridge and the Chongqi Bridge, to cross the Yangtze River north of Shanghai.

Wuzhuang toll station in Chuzhou is Asia's largest toll plaza, having 12 + 24 toll lanes. It is located along G40 as one of the important east-west passages from the western direction to Jiangsu, Zhejiang and Shanghai. It is also located close to Nanjing, an important transport node in Jiangsu. During the post-Spring Festival rush of 2025, the station reported a maximum of 126,000 daily through passes.

The expressway passes through the following cities:

- Shanghai
- Nantong, Jiangsu
- Yangzhou, Jiangsu
- Nanjing, Jiangsu
- Hefei, Anhui
- Lu'an, Anhui
- Xinyang, Henan
- Nanyang, Henan
- Shangzhou District, Shangluo, Shaanxi
- Xi'an, Shaanxi
