= List of longest road tunnels =

This page presents a list of the longest road tunnels of the world. This page lists all road tunnels longer than 5 km (3 mi).

== World's longest road tunnels in use ==
Name	Location	Length	Year	Tubes	Road
Lærdal Tunnel	Norway (Lærdalsøyri - Aurlandsvangen)	24.51 km (15.2 mi)	2000	1	E16
WestConnex	Australia (Sydney)	22.4 km (13.91 mi)	2023	2	M4, M8
Tianshan Shengli Tunnel	China (Xinjiang)	22.13 km (13.8 mi)	2025	2	G0711 Ürümqi–Ruoqiang Expressway
Yamate Tunnel	Japan (Tokyo)	18.20 km (11.3 mi)	2015	2	C2, Shuto Expressway
Zhongnanshan Tunnel	China (Shaanxi)	18.04 km (11.2 mi)	2007	2	G65 Baotou–Maoming Expresswayy
Jinpingshan Tunnel	China (Sichuan)	17.54 km (10.9 mi) (Note: 17.540 km + 17.485 km)	2011	2	between sites of Jinping-I and Jinping-II Hydropower Station
St. Gotthard	Switzerland (Uri - Ticino)	16.918 km (10.5 mi)	1980	1	A2/E35
Tiantaishan Tunnel	China (Shaanxi)	15.56 km (9.7 mi)	2021	2	G85 Yinchuan–Kunming Expressway
Daliangshan #1 Tunnel	China (Sichuan）	15.366 km (9.548 mi)	2025	2	S71 Sichuan Leshan-Xichang Expressway
Muzhailing Tunnel	China (Gansu)	15.226 km (9.5 mi)	2024	2	G75 Lanzhou–Haikou Expressway
Zigana Tunnel	Turkey (Maçka - Torul)	14.476 km (9.0 mi)	2023	2	D.885, E97
Ryfylke Tunnel	Norway	14.459 km (9.0 mi)	2019	2	13
Ovit Tunnel	Turkey (İkizdere - İspir)	14.346 km (8.9 mi)	2018	2	D.925
Taihangshan Tunnel	China (Shanxi)	14.104 km (8.8 mi)	2026	2	Shanxi S60 Xiyang-Yuci Expressway
Arlberg	Austria (Vorarlberg - Tyrol)	13.972 km (8.7 mi)	1978	1	S16/E60
Micangshan Tunnel	China (Sichuan)	13.833 km (8.6 mi) (Note: left tube 13,833 m, right tube 13,792 m)	2018	2	G85 Yinchuan–Kunming Expressway
Dabashan Tunnel	China (Shaanxi-Chongqing）	13.715 km (8.522 mi)	2025	2	G69 Yinchuan–Baise Expressway
Xishan Tunnel	China (Shanxi)	13.654 km (8.5 mi) (Note: Left tube 13,654 m; Right tube13,570 m)	2012	2	S56 Shanxi Taiyuan-Gujiao Expressway
Erlangshan Tunnel	China (Sichuan)	13.433 km (8.3 mi) (Note: left tube 13,433 m, right tube 13,381 m)	2017	2	G42_{18} Ya'an-Yecheng Expressway
Shiziping Tunnel	China (Sichuan)	13.156 km (8.2 mi)	2020	2	G42_{17} Chengdu-Changdu Expressway
Hongtiguan Tunnel	China (Shanxi)	13.122 km (8.2 mi) (Note: left tube 13,122 m, right tube: 13,098 m)	2013	2	S76 Shanxi Changzhi-Pingshun Expressway
Baima Tunnel	China (Sichuan)	13.010 km (8.084 mi)	2025	2	G8513 Pingliang-Mianyang Expressway
Hsuehshan	Taiwan (New Taipei City - Yilan)	12.942 km (8.0 mi)	2006	2	National Freeway 5
Fréjus	France - Italy	12.895 km (8.0 mi)	1980	2	E70
Guigala Tunnel	China (Xizang)	12.790 km (7.9 mi)	2024	2	Lhasa-Tsetang Expressway
Daliangshan #2 Tunnel	China (Sichuan)	12.475 km (7.752 mi)	2024	2	Leshan-Kunming Expressway
KPE & MCE Expressway Tunnel (Note: Tunnel section of KPE (8.13 km) and MCE (4.33 km) are contiguous, hence classified as one tunnel)	Singapore	12.46 km (7.7 mi)	2013	2	Kallang–Paya Lebar Expressway and Marina Coastal Expressway
Gaoloushan Tunnel	China (Gansu)	12.334 km (7.664 mi)	2024	2	G85_{13} Pingliang-Mianyang Expressway
Maijishan Tunnel	China (Gansu)	12.29 km (7.6 mi) (Note: 12.290 km + 12.286 km)	2009	2	G30 Lianyungang–Khorgas Expressway
Daxiagu Tunnel	China (Sichuan)	12.146 km (7.5 mi)	2023	2	S66 Longchang-Hanyuan Expressway
North Tianshan Tunnel	China (Xinjiang)	11.888 km (7.4 mi)	2026	2	China National Highway G577
East Tianshan Tunnel	China (Xinjiang)	11.775 km (7.3 mi) (Note: left tube: 11,764m, right tube: 11,775m)	2021	2	China National Highway G575
Mt. Blanc	France - Italy (Alps)	11.611 km (7.2 mi)	1965	1	E25
Laoying Tunnel	China (Yunnan)	11.515 km (7.2 mi) (Note: Left tube: 11,475m, Right tube: 11,520m, 1266m deep)	2021	2	G56_{13} Baoshan-Lushui Expressway
Chengkai Tunnel	China (Chongqing)	11.489 km (7.1 mi) (Note: Left tube: 11,489m, Right tube: 11,456m)	2022	2	G69 Yinchuan–Baise Expressway
Gudvangen	Norway (Gudvangen - Flåm)	11.428 km (7.1 mi)	1991	1	E16
Yunshan Tunnel	China (Shanxi)	11.408 km (7.1 mi) (Note: left tube 11,408 m, right tube: 11,377 m)	2014	2	G25_{16} Dongyin-Luliang Expressway
Yingpanshan Tunnel	China (Yunnan)	11.310 km (7.0 mi)	2022	2	G42_{16} Chengdu-Lijiang Expressway
Eysturoy Tunnel	Faroe Islands	11.240 km (7.0 mi) (Note: segments 7.5 km (4.7 mi), 2.2 km (1.4 mi) and 1.7 km (1.1 mi))	2020	1 (Note: forked with roundabout and 3 segments)	
Baojiashan Tunnel	China (Shaanxi)	11.200 km (7.0 mi) (Note: left tube 11,200m, right tube 11,195 m)	2009	2	G65 Baotou–Maoming Expressway
Huzhubeishan Tunnel	China (Qinghai)	11.171 km (6.9 mi)	2025	2	China National Highway G341
Folgefonna	Norway (Odda - Eitrheim)	11.15 km (6.9 mi)	2001	1	49
Pengshui Tunnel	China (Chongqing)	11.135 km (6.9 mi)	2025	2	G65 Baotou–Maoming Expressway
Kan-Etsu Tunnel	Japan (Gunma - Niigata)	11.055 km (6.9 mi) (Note: the older tube 10,926 m)	1985 (Note: second tube opened in 1991)	2	Kan-Etsu Expressway
Lianfeng Tunnel	China (Yunnan)	11.000 km (6.835 mi) (Note: left tube: 10,990m, right tube: 11,000m)	2024	2	Dali-Yongsheng Expressway
Inje-Yangyang Tunnel	South Korea (Gangwon Province)	10.962 km (6.85 mi) (Note: 10.965 km (Seoul bound, 10.962 km (Yangyang Bound))	2017	2	Seoul–Yangyang Expressway
Taihu Tunnel	China (Jiangsu)	10.790 km (6.7 mi)	2021	2	Shanghai-Changzhou Expressway
Sandoy Tunnel	Faroe Islands (Sandoy)	10.785 km (6.7 mi)	2023	1	National highway 12
Hida Tunnel	Japan (Gifu)	10.71 km (6.7 mi)	2008	1	Tokai-Hokuriku Expressway
Toven Tunnel	Norway	10.655 km (6.6 mi)	2014	1	78
Tongzi Tunnel	China (Guizhou)	10.497 km (6.5 mi) (Note: left tube: 10,497m, right tube: 10,485m)	2023	2	G7521 Chongqing-Guiyang Expressway
Dawanshan Tunnel	China (Shanxi)	10.490 km (6.5 mi) (Note: left tube: 10,497m, right tube: 10,485m)	2022	2	Jingle-Xingxian Expressway
Baotashan Tunnel	China (Shanxi)	10.480 km (6.512 mi) (Note: left tube 10,192 m, right tube 10,480 m)	2012	2	G25_{16} Dongyin-Luliang Expressway
Ninghui Tunnel	China (Sichuan)	10.297 km (6.398 mi) (Note: left tube: 10,297m, right tube: 10,251m)	2025	2	G42_{16} Chengdu-Lijiang Expressway
Gran Sasso d'Italia	Italy (Abruzzo)	10.176 km (6.3 mi) (Note: the newer tube 10,173 m))	1984 (Note: second tube opened in 1995)	2	A24
Plabutsch Tunnel	Austria	10.085 km (6.3 mi) (Note: the older tube 9,755 m, the newer tube 10,085 m))	1987 (Note: second tube opened in 2004)	2	A9/E57
Jondal Tunnel	Norway (Mauranger - Jondal)	10.05 km (6.2 mi)	2012	1	49
Nibashan Tunnel (Note: previous name is Daxiangling Tunnel)	China (Sichuan)	10.007 km (6.2 mi) (Note: 10.007 km + 9.962 km)	2012	2	G5 Beijing–Kunming Expressway
Duplex A86	France (Rueil-Malmaison - Versailles)	10 km (6.2 mi)	2011	1 (Note: the two two-lane directions are superimposed (hence duplex) in one tube)	A86
Tunnels of the M-30	Spain (Madrid)	9.9 km (6.2 mi)	2007	2 (Note: longest underground branch: W-E direction tube (Avenida de Portugal, M-30, Bypass sur))	A-5, M-30
Lehong Tunnel	China (Yunnan)	9.753 km (6.1 mi) (Note: left tube: 9,753m, right tube: 9,752m)	2023	2	G76_{11} Duyun-Shangri-la Expressway
Zhongtiaoshan Tunnel	China (Shanxi-Henan)	9.67 km (6.0 mi) (Note: left tube 9,670 m, right tube 9,663 m)	2015	2	G59 Hohhot–Beihai Expressway
Guanshan	China (Gansu)	9.651 km (6.0 mi) (Note: left tube: 9,585m, right tube: 9,651m)	2021	2	G85_{13} Pingliang-Mianyang Expressway
Tokyo Bay Aqua-Line	Japan (Tokyo Bay)	9.576 km (6.0 mi) (Note: two subsea tubes (second 9,583 m))	1997	2	409
Liupanshan Tunnel	China (Ningxia)	9.49 km (5.9 mi) (Note: left tube 9,490 m, right tube 9,480 m)	2012	2	G22 Qingdao–Lanzhou Expressway
Yanglin Tunnel	China (Yunnan)	9.470 km (5.9 mi)	2020	2	G5601 Kunming City Loop Expressway
Songshan Tunnel	China (Beijing-Hebei)	9.420 km (5.9 mi)	2020	2	Beijing-Chongli Expressway
Wuzhishan Tunnel	China (Sichuan)	9.405 km (5.844 mi)	2023	2	G42_{16} Chengdu-Lijiang Expressway
Mælefjell Tunnel (Seljord-Hjartdal)	Norway	9.355 km (5.8 mi)	2019	1	E134
Beijing East Sixth Ring Road Tunnel	China (Beijing)	9.35 km (5.8 mi)	2025	2	G4501 Beijing 6th Ring Road
Jiajinshan Tunnel	China (Sichuan)	9.35 km (5.81 mi)	2025	1	China National Highway G351
Lyshorn Tunnel	Norway	9.3 km (5.8 mi)	2022	2	E39
Seelisberg	Switzerland	9.292 km (5.8 mi)	1980	2	A2/E35
Dr. Syama Prasad Mookerjee Tunnel	India (Jammu & Kashmir)	9.28 km (5.8 mi)	2017	2	NH44
Niuyanshan Tunnel	China (Fujian)	9.252 km (5.7 mi) (Note: left tube 9,252 m, right tube 9,198 m)	2015	2	G3 Beijing–Taipei Expressway
Wankai Tunnel	China (Chongqing)	9.228 km (5.7 mi) (Note: left tube: 9,228m, right tube: 9,215m)	2021	2	Wangzhou-Kaizhou Rapid Road
Laojieling Tunnel	China (Henan)	9.183 km (5.706 mi)	2021	2	Zhengzhou-Luanchuan Expressway
Vestfjarðagöng	Iceland (Ísafjörður)	9.12 km (5.7 mi)	1995	1 (Note: 3 branches connecting in a Y-junction inside the tunnel)	Vestfjarðavegur
Atal Tunnel	India (Himachal Pradesh)	9.02 km (5.6 mi)	2020	1	Leh–Manali Highway
West Qinling Tunnel (Note: previous name is Mayazi Tunnel)	China (Gansu)	9.007 km (5.6 mi) (Note: left tube 8,985 m, right tube 9,007 m)	2013	2	G75 Lanzhou–Haikou Expressway
NorthConnex	Australia (Sydney)	9.0 km (5.6 mi)	2020	2	M1 to M2 link
Taixu Tunnel	China (Shanxi)	8.796 km (5.4655810069196 mi)	2024	2	G20_{03} Taiyuan Bypass Expressway
Kurigo Tunnel	Japan	8.972 km (5.6 mi)	2017	1	Tohoku Central Expressway
Yaling Tunnel	China (Shaanxi)	8.968 km (5.572 mi)	2025	2	Meixian-Taibai Expressway
Shanghai Yangtse River Tunnel	China (Shanghai)	8.95 km (5.6 mi)	2009	2	G40 Shanghai–Xi'an Expressway
Jiashatian Tunnel	China (Sichuan)	8.902 km (5.531 mi)	2025	2	G42_{16} Chengdu-Lijiang Expressway
Mumbai-Pune Expressway Missing Link Tunnel	India (Lonavala)	8.9 km (5.5 mi)	2024	2	Mumbai-Pune Expressway
Karmøy	Norway	8.9 km (5.5 mi)	2013	1	553
Xinglong Tunnel	China (Yunnan)	8.843 km (5.495 mi)	2022	2	Jianshui-Yuanyang Expressway
Foling Tunnel	China (Shanxi)	8.805 km (5.5 mi) (Note: left tube 8,803 m, right tube 8,805 m)	2016	2	S45 Tianzhen-Licheng Expressway
Taixu Tunnel	China (Shanxi)	8.796 km (5.5 mi)	2024	2	G20_{03} Taiyuan Ring Expressway
Zhegushan Tunnel	China (Sichuan)	8.795 km (5.5 mi) (Note: left tube 8,803 m, right tube 8,776 m)	2019	2	S9 Sichuan Wenchuan-Maerkang Expressway
Baoding #2 Tunnel	China (Sichuan)	8.775 km (5.453 mi)	2020	2	Panzhihua-Dali Expressway
Variante di Valico	Italy	8.703 (5.4)	2015	2	Autostrada A1
Micangshan Tunnel	China (Gansu)	8.694 km (5.4 mi) (Note: left tube 8,694 m, right tube 8,688 m)	2014	2	G85_{13} Pingliang-Mianyang Expressway
Jinlong Tunnel (Note: previous name is Longtan Tunnel)	China (Hubei)	8.693 km (5.4 mi) (Note: 8.693 km + 8.599 km)	2008	2	G50, Shanghai-Chengdu West Expressway
Dapanshan Tunnel	China (Zhejiang)	8.678 km (5.392 mi) (Note: Left tube: 8,640m, Right tube: 8,776m)	2020	2	Hangzhou-Shaoxin-Taizhou Expressway
Huangzhushan Tunnel	China (Fujian)	8.668 km (5.4 mi) (Note: left tube 8,668 m, right tube 8,631 m)	2015	2	G3 Beijing–Taipei Expressway
La Línea	Colombia	8.652 km (5.4 mi)	2020	1	National Route 40
Enasan	Japan (Japan Alps)	8.646 km (5.4 mi)	1975 (Note: second tube opened in 1985)	2	Chūō Expressway
Somport Tunnel	France - Spain (Pyrenees)	8.608 km (5.3 mi)	2003	1	E07
Korgfjellet	Norway	8.568 km (5.3 mi)	2005	1	E6
Tianheshan Tunnel	China (Shanxi-Hebei)	8.511 km (5.3 mi) (Note: left tube 8,511 m, right tube 8,477 m)	2015	2	G2516 Dongyin-Luliang Expressway
Lowari Tunnel	Pakistan (Dir–Chitral)	8.5 km (5.3 mi) (Note: The longer of two segments separated by half a kilometre, the other one being 1.9 km (1.2 mi); total length 10.4 kilometres (6.5 mi).)	2017	1	N-45 National Highway
Banihal Qazigund Road Tunnel	India (Jammu and Kashmir)	8.45 km (5.3 mi)	2021	2	NH 44
Zheduoshan Tunnel	China (Sichuan)	8.427 km (5.236 mi)	2024	1	China National Highway G318
Cuiyunshan Tunnel	China (Hebei)	8.42 km (5.23 mi)	2021	2	S38_{01} Beijing-Chongli Expressway
Jinkouhe Tunnel	China (Sichuan)	8.400 km (5.220 mi)	2022	2	S66 Longchang-Hanyuan Expressway
Wulaofeng Tunnel	China (Yunnan)	8.360 km (5.2 mi) (Note: left tube: 8,360m, right tube: 8,305m)	2022	2	Jianshui-Yuanyang Expressway
Gleinalm Tunnel	Austria	8.32 km (5.2 mi)	1978	1	A9/E57
Dapingshan Tunnel	China (Hubei)	8.263 km (5.1 mi) (Note: left tube 8,263 m, right tube 8,242 m)	2014	2	S63 Shuanggou-Yinji Expressway
Shimen Tunnel	China (Shaanxi)	8.262 km (5.1 mi) (Note: left tube 8,262m, right tube 8,247m)	2017	2	G85 Yinchuan-Kunming Expressway
Túnel de Oriente	Colombia	8.229 km (5.1 mi)	2019	2	Medellin-Airport
Qilinguan Tunnel	China (Hubei)	8.225 km (5.111 mi)	2025	2	G59 Hohhot–Beihai Expressway
Huayingshan Tunnel	China (Sichuan)	8.159 km (5.1 mi)	2017	2	G55_{15} Zhangjiajie-Nanchong Expressway
Lanjiayan Tunnel	China (Sichuan)	8.149 km (5.1 mi)	2022	1	China National Highway G545
Yeheshan Tunnel	China (Shaanxi)	8.135 km (5.1 mi)	2025	2	S25 Shaanxi Lingyou Famen Expressway
Steigen Tunnel	Norway (Steigen Municipality)	8.079 km (5.0 mi)	1990	1	835
Qishan Tunnel	China (Fujian)	8.044 km (5.0 mi)	2015	2	G15_{17} Puyan Expressway
Wangjiazhai Tunnel	China (Yunnan)	8.040 km (5.0 mi)	2025	2	Kunming-Yiliang Expressway
Jaeyaksan Tunnel	South Korea (South Gyeongsang Province)	7.982 km (5.0 mi)	2020	2	Hamyang-Ulsan Expressway
Xueshanliang Tunnel	China (Sichuan)	7.980 km (4.959 mi)	2017	1	Highway S303, Chuanzhusi-Huanglong Highway
Songshan Tunnel	China (Guangdong)	7.970 km (4.952 mi)	2021	2	S27 Shaoguan-Xinfeng Expressway
Guanyin Tunnel	Taiwan (Yilan)	7.964 km (4.949 mi)	2020	2	Provincial Highway 9, Suhua Highway
Sant' Antonio Morignone	Italy	7.96 km (4.9 mi)	2000		SS38
Balangshan Tunnel	China (Sichuan)	7.95 km (4.94 mi)	2016	1	G350 National Highway
Ziyang Tunnel (Note: previous name is Mixiliang Tunnel)	China (Shaanxi)	7.938 km (4.932 mi)	2010	2	G30, Ankang-Maoba Expressway
Bømlafjord	Norway	7.931 km (4.9 mi)	2000	1	E39
Kuocangshan Tunnel	China (Zhejiang)	7.930 km (4.927 mi)	2008	2	Zhuji-Yongjia Expressway
Wunüfeng	China (Jilin)	7.930 km (4.927 mi) (Note: Left tube: 7,930m, Right tube: 7,871m)	2019	2	G11_{12} Ji'an-Shuangliao Expressway
Rennsteig	Germany	7.916 km (4.9 mi)	2003	2	A71
Maluanshan Tunnel	China (Guangdong)	7.904 km (4.911 mi) (Note: left tube 7,886 m, right tube 7,892 m)	2021	2	Pingshan-Yantian Rapid Road
Karawanken	Austria - Slovenia	7.864 km (4.9 mi)	1991	1	E61
Beiling Tunnel	China (Fujian)	7.860 km (4.884 mi)	2023	2	Fuzhou North 2nd Corridor
Zhushanhu Tunnel	China (Jiangsu)	7.810 km (4.853 mi)	2025	2	Jiangsu S341 Highway
Dongshan Tunnel	China (Shanxi)	7.810 km (4.853 mi)	2025	2	Shanxi S66 Fenyang-Shilou Expressway
Jiaozhou Bay Tunnel	China (Shandong)	7.797 km (4.845 mi)	2011	2	
Shanghai North Horizontal Corridor West Tunnel	China (Shanghai)	7.788 km (4.8 mi)	2021	2	Shanghai North Horizontal Corridor
Samruddhi Mahamarg Igatpuri Tunnel	India (Igatpuri)	7.7 km (4.8 mi)	2025	2	Mumbai–Nagpur Expressway
Eiksund	Norway	7.765 km (4.8 mi)	2008	1	653
Qiushan Tunnel	China (Shaanxi)	7.670 km (4.766 mi) (Note: Left tube: 7,654m, Right tube: 7,670m)	2020	2	G69_{11} Ankang-Laifeng Expressway
Qiganshan Tunnel	China (Chongqing)	7.660 km (4.760 mi)	2022	2	G69 Yinchuan–Baise Expressway
Svartisen Tunnel	Norway	7.615 km (4.7 mi)	1987	1	17
Fangdoushan Tunnel	China (Chongqing)	7.605 km (4.726 mi) (Note: 7.605 km + 7.567 km)	2006	2	G50, Zhong County-Shizhu Expressway
Cangling Tunnel	China (Zhejiang)	7.605 km (4.726 mi) (Note: 7.605 km + 7.536 km)	2009	2	Taizhou-Jinhua Expressway
Jiudingshan Tunnel	China (Yunnan)	7.597 km (4.721 mi) (Note: left tube 7,597m, right tube 7,560m)	2022	2	New Chuxiong-Dali Expressway
Galleria di Santa Lucia	Italy	7.548 km (4.690 mi)	2022	1	A1
Mingtangshan Tunnel	China (Anhui)	7.548 km (4.690 mi) (Note: left tube 7,548 m, right tube 7,531 m)	2015	2	G42_{21} Shanghai–Wuhan Expressway
Munmudaewang 1 Tunnel	South Korea (North Gyeongsang Province)	7.543 km (4.7 mi) (Note: 7.540 km (Busan bound), 7.543 km (Pohang Bound))	2016	2	Donghae Expressway
Høyanger Tunnel	Norway	7.543 km (4.7 mi)	1982	1	55
Norðfjarðargöng	Iceland	7.542 km (4.7 mi)	2017		
Aerjinshan Tunnel	China (Gansu)	7.527 km (4.7 mi) (Note: left tube: 7,525m, right tube: 7,527m)	2022	2	G30_{11} Liuyuan–Golmud Expressway
Shimenya Tunnel	China (Hubei)	7.524 km (4.675 mi) (Note: left tube 7,524 m, right tube 7,493 m)	2014	2	G42 Shanghai–Chengdu Expressway
Višňové tunnel	Slovakia	7.520 km (4.673 mi) (Note: left tube 7,503 m, right tube 7,537 m)	2025	2	D1 motorway, European route E50
Vallavik	Norway	7.51 km (4.7 mi)	1985	1	13
Jiming Tunnel	China (Chongqing)	7.447 km (4.627 mi)	2022	2	G69 Yinchuan–Baise Expressway
Oppdølstrand Tunnel	Norway	7.43 km (4.6 mi)	2014	1	70
Åkrafjord	Norway	7.4 km (4.6 mi)	2000	1	E134
Vaðlaheiðargöng	Iceland	7.4 km (4.6 mi)	2018		
Zimuyan Tunnel	China (Chongqing - Guizhou)	7.399 km (4.598 mi)	2025	2	G65 Baotou–Maoming Expressway
Oslofjord	Norway	7.39 km (4.6 mi)	2000	1	E134
Jinhuashan Tunnel	China (Zhejiang)	7.388 km (4.591 mi)	2020	2	G25 Changchun–Shenzhen Expressway
Nanjing Dinghuaimen Yangtze River Tunnel	China (Jiangsu)	7.36 km (4.6 mi)	2016	2	
Motianling Tunnel	China (Chongqing)	7.353 km (4.569 mi) (Note: 7.353 km + 7.280 km)	2008	2	G42, Yichang-Chongqing Expressway
Canglongxia Tunnel	China (Shaanxi)	7.350 km (4.567 mi)	2022	2	Ningshaan-Shiquan Expressway
Fangdoushan Tunnel	China (Chongqing)	7.310 km (4.542 mi)	2013	2	G5021 Shizhu-Chongqing Expressway
Dagangshan Tunnel	China (Sichuan)	7.309 km (4.542 mi)	2024	2	Luding-Shimian Expressway
Aizigou Tunnel	China (Sichuan)	7.246 km (4.502 mi) (Note: left tube 7,246 m, right tube 7,223 m)	2014	2	Kala Yangfanggou Hydroelectricity Power Station Road
Taiyangping Tunnel	China (Guizhou)	7.206 km (4.478 mi)	2024	2	Jinsha-Huairen-Tongzi Expressway
Yunwushan Tunnel	China (Shaanxi)	7.209 km (4.479 mi)	2022	2	Ningshaan-Shiquan Expressway
Huoshan Tunnel	China (Sichuan)	7.197 km (4.472 mi)	2024	2	G42_{16} Chengdu-Lijiang Expressway
Geumjeongsan Tunnel	South Korea (Busan)	7.190 km (4.5 mi) (Note: 7.190 km (Gijang bound), 7.087 km (Jinyeong Bound))	2018	2	Busan Ring Expressway
Luotuoshan Tunnel	China (Shanxi)	7.185 km (4.5 mi)	2024	2	G20_{03} Taiyuan Bypass Expressway
Shinkobe	Japan	7.175 km (4.458 mi)	1988		
Lizhuang Tunnel	China (Sichuan)	7.147 km (4.441 mi)	2008	1	Jingping Hydroelectricity Power Station Road
Baiyun Tunnel	China (Chongqing)	7.12 km (4.42 mi)	2008	2	G65, | Chongqing-Changsha Expressway
Dayan Tunnel	China (Sichuan)	7.081 km (4.400 mi)	2022	2	S66 Longchang-Hanyuan Expressway
Que'ershan Tunnel	China (Sichuan)	7.079 km (4.399 mi)	2017	1	G317 National Highway 317
Shangluo Tunnel	China (Sichuan)	7.066 km (4.391 mi) (Note: left tube: 7,066m, right tube: 7,032m)	2023	2	Yinbing-Weixing Expressway
Taining Tunnel	China (Fujian)	7.039 km (4.374 mi)	2013	2	S03_{11} Fujian Pucheng Jianning Expressway
Wuhan East Lake Tunnel	China (Hubei)	7.039 km (4.374 mi)	2015	2	Wuhan East Lake Corridor
Qionglaishan Tunnel	China (Sichuan)	7.030 km (4.368 mi)	2024	1	S450 Sichuan Provincial Highway
Caoguoshan Tunnel	China (Yunnan)	7.005 km (4.353 mi)	2022	2	Manhao-Jinping Expressway
Kherrata Tunnel	Algeria	7 km (4.3 mi)	1988	1	
Juebashan Tunnel	China (Tibet)	6.995 km (4.346 mi)	2024	1	G318 National Highway
Yinpingshan Tunnel	China (Guangdong)	6.963 km (4.327 mi)	2013	2	G04_{22} Wuhan-Shenzhen Expressway
Xuefengshan Tunnel	China (Hunan)	6.956 km (4.322 mi)	2006	2	G60, Shaoyang-Huaihua Expressway
Landeck	Austria	6.955 km (4.3 mi)	2000	1	180
Egan Tunnel	China (Hubei-Jiangxi)	6.948 km (4.317 mi)	2012	2	G45 Daqing–Guangzhou Expressway
Detuo Tunnel	China (Sichuan)	6.940 km (4.312 mi)	2025	2	Luding-Shimian Expressway
Héðinsfjarðargöng I	Iceland	6.93 km (4.3 mi)	2010	1	76
Daliangshan Tunnel	China (Yunnan)	6.900 km (4.287 mi)	2023	2	Lincang-Qingshuihe Expressway
Shanghai North Horizontal Corridor East Tunnel	China (Shanghai)	6.9 km (4.3 mi)	2024	2	Shanghai North Horizontal Corridor
Fenshuiling Tunnel	China (Hebei)	6.891 km (4.282 mi)	2013	2	G95 Capital Ring Expressway
Tongsheng Tunnel	China (Hubei)	6.887 km (4.279 mi)	2015	2	G59 Hohhot-Beihai Expressway
Nordkapp	Norway	6.875 km (4.3 mi)	1999	1	E69
Maurice Lemaire	France	6.872 km (4.3 mi)	1976 (Note: in 1976 opened as road tunnel, in 1937 originally opened as rail tunnel)	1	N159
Wushaoling No. 2 Tunnel	China (Gansu)	6.868 km (4.268 mi) (Note: left tube 6,848 m, right tube 6,868 m)	2013	2	G30 Lianyungang–Khorgas Expressway
Quchiwan Tunnel	China (Hubei)	6.833 km (4.246 mi)	2021	2	Baokang-Shennongjia Expressway
Shenzhong Corridor Undersea Tunnel	China (Guangdong)	6.830 km (4.244 mi)	2024	2	G25_{18} Shenzhen-Cenxi Expressway
Jinggangshan Tunnel	China (Jiangxi)	6.810 km (4.232 mi) (Note: left tube 6,810 m, right tube 6,806 m)	2013	2	S50 Jiangxi Taijing Expressway
Yanqian Tunnel	China (Fujian)	6.795 km (4.222 mi) (Note: left tube 6,795 m, right tube 6,785 m)	2015	2	G3 Beijing–Taipei Expressway
Xiaopotou Tunnel	China (Yunnan)	6.795 km (4.222 mi)	2025	2	Huize-Qiaojia Expressway
Maojingba Tunnel	China (Hebei-Inner Mongolia)	6.776 km (4.210 mi) (Note: left tube 6,752 m, right tube 6,776 m)	2013	2	G45 Daqing–Guangzhou Expressway
Sizhouling Tunnel (Note: previous name is Xizhouling Tunnel)	China (Zhejiang)	6.765 km (4.204 mi) (Note: left tube 6,750 m, right tube 6,765 m)	2013	2	S33 Zhejiang Longli Expressway
Frudal	Norway	6.758 km (4.2 mi)	1995	1	5
Xishanyin Tunnel	China (Yunnan)	6.758 km (4.199 mi)	2025	2	Sanshui-Qingshui Expressway
Muzuo Tunnel	China (Sichuan)	6.744 km (4.191 mi)	2022	2	G85_{13} Pingliang-Mianyang Expressway
Pfänder	Austria	6.718 km (4.2 mi)	1980; 2013	2	A14/E43
Baihetan Tunnel	China (Sichuan)	6.714 km (4.172 mi)	2025	2	G42_{16} Chengdu-Lijiang Expressway
Baizhishan Tunnel	China (Chongqing)	6.710 km (4.169 mi)	2013	1	S402 Chengwan Highway
Yunwushan Tunnel	China (Hubei)	6.708 km (4.168 mi) (Note: 6.708 km + 6.693 km)	2008	2	Shanghai-Chengdu West Expressway
Airport Link	Australia (Brisbane)	6.7 km (4.2 mi)	2012	2	Metroad 7 (M7), Brisbane
Finnøy	Norway	6.7 km (4.2 mi)	2009	1	519
Wulaoshan Tunnel	China (Yunnan)	6.685 km (4.154 mi) (Note: left tube: 6,685m, right tube: 6,640m)	2021	2	G56_{15} Tianbao-Houqiao Expressway
Dulongjiang Tunnel	China (Yunnan)	6.68 km (4.15 mi)	2015	1	Dulongjiang Highway
Hongyansi Tunnel	China (Hubei)	6.678 km (4.150 mi) (Note: 6.678 km + 6.676 km)	2015	2	G59 Hohhot-Beihai Expressway
Yangjiao Tunnel	China (Chongqing)	6.676 km (4.148 mi) (Note: 6.656 km + 6.676 km)	2008	2	G65 Baotou-Maoming Expressway
Lüjialiang Tunnel	China (Chongqing)	6.664 km (4.141 mi) (Note: 6.664 km + 6.663 km)	2009	2	G50, Zhong County-Shizhu Expressway
Hong Kong-Zhuhai-Macau Bridge Undersea Tunnel	China (Guangdong)	6.648 km (4.131 mi)	2018	3	G94 Pearl River Delta Ring Expressway
Karisaka Tunnel	Japan	6.625 km (4.1 mi)	1998	1	140
Wujialiang Tunnel	China (Chongqing)	6.618 km (4.112 mi) (Note: left tube: 6,618m, right tube: 6,592m)	2022	2	G69 Yinchuan–Baise Expressway
Wulong Tunnel	China (Chongqing)	6.618 km (4.112 mi)	2025	2	Yuxiang 2nd Expressway
Niujinshan Tunnel	China (Shanxi)	6.612 km (4.1 mi)	2024	2	G20_{03} Taiyuan Bypass Expressway
YinmaanTunnel	China (Beijing)	6.611 km (4.108 mi)	2024	2	S3701 Beijing-Yuxian Expressway
Fodnes Tunnel	Norway	6.604 km (4.1 mi)	1995	1	5
Yemajian No. 1 Tunnel	China (Zhejiang)	6.602 km (4.102 mi)	2023	2	G40_{12} Liyang-Ningde Expressway
Western Scheldt Tunnel	The Netherlands	6.6 km (4.1 mi)	2003	2	N62
San Bernardino	Switzerland	6.596 km (4.1 mi)	1967	1	A13/E43
Innfjord	Norway	6.594 km (4.1 mi)	1991	1	E136
Dabieshan Tunnel	China (Anhui - Henan)	6.5928 km (4.1 mi)	2025	2	G42_{22} He County–Xiangyang Expressway
Dazhuang Tunnel	China (Hubei)	6.570 km (4.082 mi) (Note: left tube 6,515 m, right tube 6,570 m)	2016	2	G50_{12} Enshi-Guangyuan Expressway
Kviven	Norway (Volda - Grodås)	6.563 km (4.1 mi)	2012	1	E39
Mingyueshan Tunnel	China (Chongqing - Sichuan)	6.557 km (4.074 mi) (Note: 6.557 km + 6.555 km)	2008	2	Dianjiang-Lingshui County Expressway
Donggongshan Tunnel	China (Fujian)	6.556 km (4.074 mi)	2012	2	G15_{14} Ningde-Shangrao Expressway
Xinglingjing Tunnel	China (Shanxi)	6.555 km (4.073 mi) (Note: both tubes 6.555 km)	2011	2	Taiyuan-Jianxian Expressway
Tianlongshan Tunnel	China (Fujian)	6.551 km (4.071 mi) (Note: left tube 6,521 m, right tube 6,551 m)	2015	2	G3 Beijing–Taipei Expressway
Leijiashan Tunnel	China (Hunan)	6.540 km (4.064 mi)	2025	2	G55_{15} Zhangjiajie-Nanchong Expressway
Muzhaling Tunnel	China (Henan)	6.537 km (4.062 mi) (Note: left tube: 6,521m, right tube: 6,537m)	2020	2	Zhengzhou-Luanchuan Expressway
Luoyanshan Tunnel	China (Fujian)	6.534 km (4.060 mi)	2017	2	G25_{17} Shaxian-Xiamen Expressway
Z-Morh Tunnel	India (Jammu Kashmir)	6.5 km (4.0 mi)	2025	1	Srinagar-Kargil-Leh highway
Jinmen Tunnel	China (Guangdong)	6.492 km (4.034 mi)	2018	2	G78 Shantou-Kunming Expressway
Xiakou Tunnel	China (Hubei)	6.487 km (4.031 mi)	2012	2	G42 Shanghai–Chengdu Expressway
Chuntianmen Tunnel	China (Chongqing)	6.476 km (4.024 mi)	2020	2	Nanchuan-Liangjiang Expressway
Baiyunshan Tunnel	China (Chongqing)	6.458 km (4.013 mi)	2025	2	Yuxiang 2nd Expressway
Zangshan Tunnel	China (Shanxi)	6.440 km (4.002 mi) (Note: left tube 6,410 m, right tube 6,440 m)	2016	2	S45 Shanxi Tianli Expressway
Taihe Tunnel	China (Yunnan)	6.420 km (3.989 mi) (Note: Left tube: 6,420m, Right tube: 6,380m)	2021	2	G56_{15} Tianbao-Houqiao Expressway
Sinbulsan Tunnel	South Korea (South Gyeongsang Province, Ulsan)	6.415 km (3.986 mi)	2020	2	Hamyang-Ulsan Expressway
Tauern	Austria	6.401 km (4.0 mi) (Note: the newer tube 6,392 m)	1975; 2011	2	A10/E55
Jiuyishan Tunnel	China (Hunan-Guangdong)	6.400 km (3.977 mi) (Note: left tube 6,395 m, right tube 6,400 m)	2014	2	G55 Erenhot-Guangzhou Expressway
Wuxi Tunnel	China (Chongqing)	6.400 km (3.977 mi)	2023	2	G69_{11} Ankang-Laifeng Expressway
Fjærland Tunnel	Norway	6.397 km (4.0 mi)	1986	1	5
Hongtu Tunnel	China (Guangdong)	6.350 km (3.946 mi) (Note: left tube: 6,336m, right tube: 6,350m)	2021	2	Dapu-Fengshun-Wuhua Expressway
Baiyunshan Tunnel	China (Henan)	6.347 km (3.944 mi)	2020	2	Zhengzhou-Luanchuan Expressway
Higo	Japan	6.34 km (3.9 mi) (Note: the newer tube 6,328 m)	1989; 1999	2	Kyushu Expressway
Sørdals	Norway	6.338 km (3.9 mi)	2007	1	E10
Wushaoling No. 4 Tunnel	China (Gansu)	6.333 km (3.935 mi) (Note: left tube 6,314 m, right tube 6,333 m)	2013	2	G30 Lianyungang–Khorgas Expressway
Shanchahua Tunnel	China (Sichuan)	6.328 km (3.932 mi) (Note: left tube: 6,284m, right tube: 6,328m)	2023	2	Suining-Yichang-Bijie Expressway
Yanlai Tunnel	China (Guangxi)	6.325 km (3.930 mi)	2022	2	Nandan-Tian'e Expressway
Jiaoding Tunnel	China (Yunnan)	6.318 km (3.926 mi) (Note: left tube 6,318 m, right tube 6,307 m)	2020	2	Zhaotong-Leshan Expressway
Putaoshan Tunnel	China (Chongqing)	6.308 km (3.920 mi) (Note: left tube 6,308 m, right tube 6,280 m)	2009	2	G65, Chongqing-Changsha Expressway
Haicang Undersea Tunnel	China (Fujian)	6.308 km (3.9 mi)	2021	2	
Norðoyatunnilin	Faroe Islands	6.3 km (3.9 mi)	2006	1	
Wuchalu Tunnel	China (Yunnan)	6.290 km (3.908 mi)	2024	2x	S59 Yunnan Mangshi-Lianghe Expressway
Hai Van Tunnel	Vietnam	6.28 km (3.9 mi)	2005; 2021	2	1
Zengjiashan Tunnel	China (Sichuan)	6.280 km (3.902 mi)	2023	2	G85_{13} Pingliang-Mianyang Expressway
Helinyakou Tunnel	China (Qinghai)	6.260 km (3.9 mi)	2024	2	China National Highway G341
Kakuto	Japan	6.255 km (3.9 mi)	1995	2	Kyushu Expressway
Fenshuiling Tunnel	China (Hubei)	6.254 km (3.886 mi) (Note: left tube 6,201 m, right tube 6,254 m)	2021	2	Baokang-Shennongjia Expressway
Mangshi Tunnel	China (Yunnan)	6.250 km (3.884 mi)	2024	2	Mangshi-Lianghe Expressway
Mawan Tunnel	China (Guangdong)	6.247 km (3.882 mi)	2025	2	Mawan Cross-sea Corridor
Jiugongshan #2 Tunnel	China (Jiangxi-Hubei)	6.210 km (3.859 mi)	2025	2	Xianning-Wuning Expressway
Hundvåg	Norway	6.200 km (3.9 mi)	2020	2	Norwegian National Road 13
Shuangfeng Tunnel	China (Zhejiang)	6.187 km (3.844 mi) (Note: left tube 6,142 m, right tube 6,187 m)	2008	2	Zhuji-Yongjia Expressway
Qinghe Tunnel	China (Yunnan)	6.185 km (3.843 mi) (Note: left tube: 6,185m, right tube: 6,130m)	2021	2	Zhaotong-Luzhou Expressway
Jixingling Tunnel	China (Chongqing, Shaanxi)	6.181 km (3.841 mi)	2023	2	G69_{11} Ankang-Laifeng Expressway
Chunmushan Tunnel	China (Hunan)	6.158 km (3.826 mi)	2023	2	Zhijiang-Tongren Expressway
Guantian Tunnel	China (Fujian)	6.151 km (3.822 mi)	2015	2	S72_{11} Zhangzhou-Yong'an Expressway
Qinling #2 Tunnel	China (Shaanxi)	6.145 km (3.818 mi) (Note: left tube 6,125 m, right tube 6,145 m)	2007	2	G5 Beijing–Kunming Expressway
Qinling #1 Tunnel	China (Shaanxi)	6.144 km (3.818 mi) (Note: left tube 6,102 m, right tube 6,144 m)	2007	2	G5 Beijing–Kunming Expressway
Dabashan Tunnel	China (Sichuan)	6.123 km (3.805 mi) (Note: 6.123 km + 6.115 km)	2011	2	Dazhou-Shaanxi Expressway
Yangbajing #2 Tunnel	China (Tibet)	6.118 km (3.802 mi)	2020	2	G6 Beijing–Lhasa Expressway
Zhongxing Tunnel	China (Chongqing)	6.105 km (3.793 mi) (Note: 6.105 km + 6.082 km)	2009	2	Wulong-Pengshui Expressway
Tempi Tunnel T2	Greece	6.100 km (3.790 mi)	2017	2	A1 Motorway, E75
Elizhai Tunnel	China (Sichuan)	6.063 km (3.767 mi)	2025	2	G85_{13} Pingliang-Mianyang Expressway
Daliangshan Tunnel	China (Shanxi)	6.058 km (3.764 mi) (Note: left tube 6,015 m, right tube 6,058 m)	2014	2	S45 Tianzhen-Licheng Expressway
Tietangxia Tunnel	China (Gansu)	6.051 km (3.760 mi) (Note: left tube 6,051 m, right tube 6,043 m)	2015	2	G70_{11} Shiyan-Tianshui Expressway
Xiang'an Undersea Tunnel	China (Fujian)	6.050 km (3.8 mi)	2010	2	
Qilianshan #2 Tunnel	China (Qinghai)	6.044 km (3.8 mi) (Note: left tube: 6,044m, right tube: 5,943m; elevation: 3,500m)	2024	2	China National Highway G569
Fengshuiguan Tunnel	China (Fujian-Jiangxi)	6.043 km (3.755 mi) (Note: left tube: 5,946.5m, right tube: 6,043.42m)	2013	2	G15_{14} Ningde-Shangrao Expressway
Tiefengshan #2 Tunnel	China (Chongqing)	6.020 km (3.741 mi) (Note: left tube: 6,010m, right tube: 6,020m)	2006	2	G50_{12} Enshi-Guangyuan Expressway
Atsumi	Japan	6.022 km (3.742 mi)	2012	1	Nihonkai-Tohoku Expressway
Yanglushan Tunnel	China (Chongqing)	6.015 km (3.738 mi) (Note: left tube: 6,010m, right tube: 6,020m)	2013	2	G50_{21} Shizhu-Chongqing Expressway
Qingyunshan Tunnel	China (Guangdong)	6.01 km (3.7 mi) (Note: left tube: 5,910m, right tube: 6,010m)	2018	2	G04_{22} Wuhan-Shenzhen Expressway
Shigushan Tunnel	China (Fujian)	6.005 km (3.731 mi)	2012	2	S30 Fujian Xiamen–Shaxian Expressway
Nantianmen Tunnel	China (Yunnan)	5.997 km (3.726 mi) (Note: left tube: 5,973m, right tube: 5,997m)	2021	2	Zhaotong-Luzhou Expressway
Huanglianping Tunnel	China (Yunnan)	5.972 km (3.711 mi) (Note: left tube 5,972 m, right tube 5,963 m)	2020	2	Zhaotong-Leshan Expressway
Naustdal Tunnel	Norway	5.97 km (3.7 mi)	1995	1	5
Øksendal Tunnel	Norway	5.965 km (3.7 mi)	2000	1	62
Guinza	Italy	5.96 km (3.7 mi)	2004		E78
Chenjiashan Tunnel	China (Zhejiang)	5.96 km (3.70 mi)	2020	2	Hangzhou-Shaoxin-Taizhou Expressway
Hongyashan Tunnel	China (Yunnan)	5.945 km (3.694 mi)	2023	2	Duyun-Shangri-La Expressway
Jiaohuan Tunnel	China (Shanghai)	5.935 km (3.7 mi)	2019	2	G15_{03} Shanghai Ring Expressway
Lehua Tunnel	China (Qinghai)	5.933 km (3.687 mi)	2024	2	China National Highway G319
Hakamagoshi Tunnel	Japan (Toyama)	5.932 km (3.7 mi)	2000	1	E41 Tokai-Hokuriku Expressway
Yokohama Kita Tunnel	Japan (Yokohama)	5.900 km (3.7 mi)	2020	2	K7 Yokohama North Route
Katschberg	Austria	5.898 km (3.665 mi)	1974; 2008	2	A10/E55
Qipanliang Tunnel	China (Hebei)	5.898 km (3.665 mi) (Note: left tube 5,874 m, right tube 5,898 m)	2019	2	S38_{01} Beijing-Chongli Expressway
Fenghuangling Tunnel	China (Shanxi)	5.897 km (3.664 mi) (Note: left tube 5,897 m, right tube 5,773.5 m)	2011	2	G18_{12} Cangzhou-Yulin Expressway
Fáskrúðsfjarðargöng	Iceland	5.894 km (3.7 mi)	2005	1	96
Wusihe Tunnel	China (Sichuan)	5.890 km (3.660 mi)	2022	2	S66 Longchang-Hanyuan Expressway
Byfjord	Norway	5.875 km (3.651 mi)	1992		E39
Yuliao Tunnel	China (Zhejiang)	5.870 km (3.647 mi)	2019	2	G15_{23} Ningbo-Dongguan Expressway
Tosen	Norway	5.857 km (3.639 mi)	1986	1	76
Strengen	Austria	5.851 km (3.636 mi)	2005; 2006	2	S16/E60
Daiyunshan Tunnel	China (Fujian)	5.850 km (3.6 mi) (Note: left tube 5,850 m, right tube 5,837 m)	2017	2	G2517 Shaxian-Xiamen Expressway
Lianghekou Tunnel	China (Sichuan)	5.840 km (3.629 mi)	2010	1	Lianghekou Hydroelectricity Power Station Road
Shixia Tunnel	China (Beijing)	5.833 km (3.6 mi) (Note: left tube 5,685 m, right tube 5,833 m)	2018	2	S3801 Beijing-Chongli Expressway
Jiangjunshi Tunnel	China (Sichuan-Gansu)	5.805 km (3.607 mi) (Note: left tube: 5804m right tube:5805m)	2012	2	G75 Lanzhou–Haikou Expressway
Grand St. Bernard	Italy - Switzerland	5.798 km (3.603 mi)	1964	1	E27
Lianchengshan Tunnel	China (Shaanxi)	5.798 km (3.603 mi)	2017	2	G85 Yinchuan–Kunming Expressway
Mala Kapela	Croatia	5.78 km (3.59 mi)	2005; 2009	2	A1
Filefjell	Norway (Filefjell in Vang Municipality)	5.780 km (3.6 mi)	2017	1	E16
Baimashan Tunnel	China (Chongqing)	5.780 km (3.592 mi)	2025	2	Chongqing-Changsha 2nd Expressway
Caijialiangzi Tunnel	China (Guizhou)	5.773 km (3.587 mi)	2025	2	Wong'an Mayan Expressway
Hvalfjarðargöng (Note: A subaqueous tunnel)	Iceland	5.77 km (3.59 mi)	1998	1	1
Opera Tunnel (Note: subsea)	Norway (Oslo)	5.767 km (3.6 mi)	2010	2	E18
Kerenzerberg	Switzerland	5.76 km (3.58 mi)	1986	1	A3
Youcheling Tunnel	China (Fujian)	5.754 km (3.575 mi) (Note: left tube: 5754m right tube:5726m)	2015	2	G15_{23} Ningbo-Dongguan Expressway
Nanping Tunnel	China (Sichuan)	5.745 km (3.570 mi)	2024	2	G85_{13} Pingliang-Mianyang Expressway
Yangliao Tunnel	China (Guangdong)	5.742 km (3.568 mi)	2023	2	Xingye Rapid Line
Milashan Tunnel	China (Tibet)	5.727 km (3.559 mi) (Note: left tube: 5,727m, right tube: 5,720m; elevation: 4,750m)	2019	2	G42_{18} Ya'an-Yecheng Expressway
Ciganyan Tunnel	China (Fujian)	5.715 km (3.551 mi) (Note: left tube: 5,715m, right tube: 5,670m)	2015	2	G15_{23} Ningbo-Dongguan Expressway
Taohuatan Tunnel	China (Anhui)	5.706 km (3.546 mi)	2021	2	Chaohu-Huangshan Expressway
Qingniling Tunnel	China (Gansu)	5.694 km (3.538 mi) (Note: left tube: 5,715m, right tube: 5,670m)	2015	2	G70_{11} Shiyan-Tianshui Expressway
Daxingxiang Tunnel	China (Yunnan)	5.690 km (3.5 mi)	2023	2	Lincang-Qingshuihe Expressway
Haukeli Tunnel	Norway	5.682 km (3.531 mi)	1968	1	E134
Sveti Rok	Croatia	5.682 km (3.531 mi)	2003; 2009	2	A1
Gaoersi Tunnel	China (Sichuan)	5.682 km (3.531 mi)	2015	1	China National Highway G318
Jieling Tunnel	China (Hubei)	5.681 km (3.530 mi) (Note: left tube: 5,653m, right tube: 5,681m)	2014	2	G42 Shanghai–Chengdu Expressway
Ying'erling Tunnel	China (Hebei)	5.677 km (3.528 mi) (Note: left tube: 5,656m, right tube: 5,677.3m)	2019	2	G18 Rongcheng–Wuhai Expressway
Marão	Portugal	5.665 km (3.520 mi)	2016	2	A4/E82
Zijing Tunnel	China (Sichuan)	5.656 km (3.514 mi)	2016	1	China National Highway G350
Mengshan Tunnel	China (Shanxi)	5.655 km (3.514 mi)	2013	2	S45 Tianzhen-Licheng Expressway
Thirrë-Kalimash Tunnel	Albania	5.65 km (3.51 mi)	2010	2	Albania–Kosovo Highway
Yongfutun Tunnel	China (Guangxi)	5.647 km (3.509 mi)	2021	2	S22 Guilin-Hechi Expressway
Dafengding Tunnel	China (Sichuan)	5.646 km (3.508 mi)	2025	2	Leshan-Kunshan Expressway
Hitra	Norway	5.645 km (3.508 mi)	1994	1	714
Damiao Tunnel	China (Hebei)	5.645 mi (9.085 km) (Note: left tube: 5,635m, right tube: 5,645m)	2013	2	S50 Chengde-Weichang Expressway
Guixi Tunnel	China (Sichuan)	5.645 km (3.508 mi)	2023	2	G85_{13} Pingliang-Mianyang Expressway
Zhengyuan Tunnel	China (Yunnan)	5.636 km (3.502 mi)	2022	2	G56_{15} Tianbao-Houqiao Expressway
Učka	Croatia	5.634 km (3.501 mi)	1981; 2024	2	A8
Guolao Tunnel	China (Gansu)	5.628 mi (9.057 km) (Note: left tube: 5,627m, right tube: 5,628m)	2019	2	Liangdang-Huixian Expressway
Motianling Tunnel	China (Liaoning)	5.625 km (3.495 mi)	2025	2	G91_{11} Benxi-Ji'an Expressway
Minoo	Japan	5.620 km (3.492 mi)	2007	1	423
Eshanjie Tunnel	China (Hubei-Shaanxi)	5.620 mi (9.045 km) (Note: left tube: 5,627m, right tube: 5,628m)	2014	2	G70_{11} Shiyan-Tianshui Expressway
Guibin Tunnel	China (Guangxi)	5.620 km (3.492 mi)	2023	2	Pingnan-Napo Expressway
Dýrafjarðargöng	Iceland	5.6 km (3.5 mi)	2020	1	Vestfjarðavegur
Xianglong Tunnel	China (Chongqing)	5.587 km (3.472 mi)	2025	2	Chongqing-Changsha Second Expressway
Jingling Tunnel	China (Zhejiang)	5.583 km (3.469 mi)	2020	2	Hangzhou-Shaoxin-Taizhou Expressway
Meiguling Tunnel	China (Fujian)	5.580 km (3.467 mi) (Note: left tube: 5,568m, right tube: 5,580m)	2003	2	G70 Fuzhou–Yinchuan Expressway
Hanna	Japan	5.578 km (3.466 mi)	1997	2	Second Osaka-Nara Road
Yunzhongshan Tunnel	China (Shanxi)	5.575 km (3.464 mi) (Note: left tube: 5,565m, right tube: 5,575m)	2011	2	G18_{12} Cangzhou-Yulin Expressway
Lixian Tunnel	China (Sichuan)	5.570 km (3.461 mi)	2019	2	G42_{17} Chengdu-Changdu Expressway
Lajishan Tunnel	China (Qinghai)	5.564 km (3.457 mi)	2012	2	S101 Qinghai 101 Highway
Wenxin #1 Tunnel	China (Yunnan)	5.563 km (3.457 mi)	2021	2	G56_{15} Tianbao-Houqiao Expressway
Shenzuo Tunnel	China (Sichuan)	5.556 km (3.452 mi) (Note: Elevation: >3,300m)	2024	2	G06_{15} Delingha-Maerkang Expressway
Túnel 3-4	Brazil (Caraguatatuba)	5.550 km (3.449 mi)	2022	2	Rodovia dos Tamoios
Da'nanshan Tunnel	China (Shanxi)	5.535 km (3.439 mi) (Note: left tube: 5,535m, right tube: 5,520m)	2012	2	G5 Beijing–Kunming Expressway
Bingcaowan Tunnel	China (Gansu)	5.525 km (3.433 mi)	2024	2	National Highway 312
Lirang Tunnel	China (Chongqing)	5.521 km (3.431 mi) (Note: left tube: 5,518m, right tube: 5,521m)	2016	2	G55_{15} Zhangjiajie-Nanchong Expressway
Qingxi Tunnel	China (Sichuan)	5.5205 km (3.4303 mi)	2022	2	Guangyuan-Pingwu Expressway
Mappo–Morettina Tunnel	Switzerland (Locarno)	5.518 km (3.429 mi)	1996		A13
Yushan Tunnel	China (Jiangxi)	5.518 km (3.429 mi) (Note: left tube: 5,518m, right tube: 5,510m)	2016	2	G60_{11} Nanchang–Shaoguan Expressway
Laboleng Tunnel	China (Gansu)	5.518 km (3.429 mi)	2022	2	S38 Gansu Wangxia Expressway
Yemaliang Tunnel	China (Shanxi)	5.512 km (3.425 mi) (Note: left tube: 5,512m, right tube: 5,512m)	2017	2	S40 Fansi-Hequ Expressway
Jiulianshan Tunnel	China (Guangdong)	5.510 km (3.424 mi) (Note: left tube: 5,450m, right tube: 5,510m)	2018	2	G04_{22} Wuhan-Shenzhen Expressway
Xiangjunshan Tunnel	China (Henan)	5.508 km (3.423 mi)	2023	2	Luanchuan-Lushi Expressway
Dejiang Tunnel	China (Guizhou)	5.505 km (3.421 mi)	2021	2	Dejiang-Xishui Expressway
Blanka tunnel complex	Czech Republic (Prague)	5.502 km (3.4 mi)	2015	2	Městský okruh
Chuyang Tunnel	China (Hubei)	5.501 km (3.418 mi) (Note: left tube: 5,444m, right tube: 5,501m)	2014	2	G42 Shanghai–Chengdu Expressway
Bosruck	Austria	5.5 km (3.4 mi)	1983		A9/E57
Nansan Tunnel	China (Yunnan)	5.500 km (3.418 mi)	2021	2	Zhengkang-Qingshuihe Expressway
Shaoping Tunnel	China (Yunnan)	5.497 km (3.4 mi)	2023	2	Ninglang-Yongsheng Expressway
Qiangfengling Tunnel	China (Shanxi)	5.495 km (3.414 mi)	2012	2	G18 Rongcheng–Wuhai Expressway
Liulangshan Tunnel	China (Shanxi)	5.493 km (3.413 mi) (Note: left tube: 5,412m, right tube: 5,493m)	2014	2	Shuozhou Ring Expressway
Ganyanggou Tunnel	China (Sichuan)	5.483 km (3.407 mi)	2019	2	G42_{17} Chengdu-Changdu Expressway
Qingfeng Tunnel	China (Yunnan)	5.48 km (3.41 mi)	2022	2	New Chuxiong-Dali Expressway
Dalijiashan Tunnel	China (Qinghai)	5.476 km (3.403 mi) (Note: left tube: 5,461m, right tube: 5,476m)	2018	2	S22 Linxia-Gonghe Expressway
Inchoenbukhang Tunnel	South Korea (Incheon)	5.460 km (3.4 mi)	2017	2	Capital Region 2nd Ring Expressway
Shenchangcun Tunnel	China (Yunnan)	5.460 km (3.4 mi)	2024	2	G56_{12} Dali-Lincang Expressway
Changning Tunnel	China (Yunnan)	5.452 km (3.4 mi)	2023	2	G56_{15} Tianbao-Houqiao Expressway
Bayuan Tunnel	China (Shaanxi)	5.450 km (3.386 mi) (Note: left tube: 5445m right tube:5450m)	2012	2	G40 Shanghai–Xi'an Expressway
Yuliangzhou Tunnel	China (Hubei)	5.440 km (3.4 mi)	2022	2	Xiangyang East-West Axis
Sanhuashi Tunnel	China (Shaanxi)	5.434 km (3.377 mi) (Note: left tube: 5431m right tube:5434m)	2011	2	G70_{11} Shiyan–Tianshui Expressway
Kanpuzan	Japan	5.432 km (3.375 mi)	1999	1	194
Bolungarvíkurgöng	Iceland	5.426 km (3.372 mi)	2010	1	61
Dongshan Tunnel	China (Yunnan)	5.425 km (3.4 mi)	2021	2	Weixing-Tianbo Expressway
Xiangyangshan Tunnel	China (Yunnan)	5.417 km (3.366 mi)	2024	2	Sanbo - Qingshui Expressway
Pulongshan Tunnel	China (Guangxi)	5.416 km (3.365 mi)	2025	2	Nanning-Dongzhong Expressway
Kuiwu Tunnel	China (Sichuan)	5.410 km (3.362 mi)	2025	2	Luding-Shimian Expressway
Yangtoushan Tunnel	China (Chongqing)	5.408 km (3.360 mi) (Note: left tube: 5,408m, right tube: 5,385m)	2014	2	G55_{15} Zhangjiajie-Nanchong Expressway
Knappe Tunnel	Norway	5.400 km (3.4 mi)	2015	2	557
Eurasia Tunnel	Turkey (Istanbul)	5.4 km (3.4 mi)	2016	1	D.100
Qiyaoshan Tunnel	China (Chongqing)	5.4 km (3.355 mi)	2021	2	G55_{15} Zhangjiajie-Nanchong Expressway
Ilgaz 15 July Independence Tunnel	Turkey	5.391 km (3.3 mi)	2016	2	D.765
Xinchang Tunnel	China (Yunnan)	5.387 km (3.347 mi)	2022	2	Yibin-Zhaotong Expressway
Botanggou Tunnel	China (Hebei)	5.386 km (3.347 mi)	2023	2	G01_{21} Beijing-Qinghuangdao Expressway
Jiulingshan Tunnel	China (Jiangxi)	5.384 km (3.345 mi)	2008	2	G45 Daqing–Guangzhou Expressway
Husa Tunnel	China (Yunnan)	5.370 km (3.337 mi)	2020	2	Tengchong-Longchuan Expressway
Guling Tunnel	China (Fujian)	5.367 km (3.335 mi) (Note: left tube: 5,351m, right tube: 5,367m)	2020	2	China National Highway G104
Shisungou Tunnel	China (Guizhou)	5.364 km (3.333 mi)	2022	2	G42_{15} Chengdu-Zunyi Expressway
Qipanguan Tunnel	China (Shaanxi)	5.360 km (3.331 mi)	2008	2	G5 Beijing–Kunming Expressway
Jinjihu Tunnel	China (Jiangsu)	5.352 km (3.326 mi)	2022	2	Zhongxin Avenue
Futang Tunnel	China (Sichuan)	5.347 km (3.322 mi) (Note: left tube: 5,347m, right tube: 5,264m)	2012	2	G42_{17} Chengdu-Changdu Expressway
Anshi Tunnel	China (Yunnan)	5.338 km (3.317 mi) (Note: left tube: 5,263m, right tube: 5,338m)	2022	2	Tengchong-Longchuan Expressway
Lishanping Tunnel	China (Yunnan)	5.338 km (3.317 mi)	2022	2	Zhaotong-Leshan Expressway
Farui Tunnel	China (Guangxi)	5.334 km (3.314 mi)	2021	2	Hezhou-Bama Expressway
Daliangzi Tunnel	China (Sichuan)	5.333 km (3.314 mi)	2008	1	Lianghekou Hydroelectricity Power Station Road
Guling Tunnel	China (Shaanxi)	5.333 km (3.314 mi) (Note: left tube: 5,273m, right tube: 5,333m)	2009	2	G70 Fuzhou–Yinchuan Expressway
Daliangzi Tunnel	China (Sichuan)	5.333 km (3.314 mi)	2008	1	Lianghekou Hydroelectricity Power Station Road
Yingxiu Tunnel	China (Sichuan)	5.325 km (3.309 mi) (Note: left tube: 5,305m, right tube: 5,325m)	2012	2	G42_{17} Chengdu-Changdu Expressway
Qinglan Tunnel	China (Guangxi)	5.322 km (3.307 mi)	2023	2	G75_{22} Guiyang-Beihai Expressway
Laoyingwo Tunnel	China (Yunnan)	5.310 km (3.3 mi)	2017	1	Wudongde Hydropower Station Road
Zhongliangshan Tunnel	China (Chongqing)	5.310 km (3.299 mi)	2024	2	Yuwu Expressway 2nd Line
Taiping Tunnel	China (Sichuan)	5.309 km (3.299 mi)	2024	2	G42_{16} Chengdu-Lijiang Expressway
Frøya	Norway	5.305 km (3.296 mi)	2000	1	714
Felbertauern	Austria	5.304 km (3.296 mi)	1967	1	108
Dahualing Tunnel	China (Hebei)	5.300 km (3.293 mi) (Note: left tube: 5,215m, right tube: 5,300m)	2010	2	G95 Capital Area Loop Expressway
Heggur Tunnel	Norway	5.277 km (3.279 mi)	1984	1	
Bataishan Tunnel	China (Chongqing-Sichuan)	5.275 km (3.278 mi)	2013	1	Chengwan Express Highway
Huangjiagou Tunnel	China (Guizhou)	5.275 km (3.278 mi) (Note: left tube: 5,265m, right tube: 5,275m)	2022	2	G75 Lanzhou–Haikou Expressway
Nanjingli Tunnel	China (Yunnan)	5.273 km (3.276 mi) (Note: left tube: 5,270 m, right tube: 5,273 m)	2017	2	Ruili-Longchuan Expressway
Atlanterhav	Norway	5.272 km (3.276 mi)	2009	1	64
Baiyanjiao Tunnel	China (Yunnan)	5.265 km (3.272 mi)	2021	2	Zhaotong-Luzhou Expressway
Zhaxi Tunnel	China (Sichuan)	5.259 km (3.268 mi) (Note: left tube: 5,259m, right tube:5,255m)	2020	2	Yinbin-Bijie Expressway
Maojian Tunnel	China (Guizhou)	5.257 km (3.267 mi) (Note: left tube: 5,257m, right tube: 5,222m)	2021	2	G76_{11} Duyun-Shangri-la Expressway
Tianshengqiao Tunnel	China (Yunnan)	5.257 km (3.267 mi)	2023	2	S51 Lincang-Shuangjiang Expressway
Yaolongshan Tunnel	China (Chongqing - Guizhou)	5.254 km (3.265 mi)	2021	2	G75_{21} Chongqing-Guiyang Expressway
Shahriston Tunnel	Tajikistan	5.253 km (3.264 mi)	2012	1	
Heimaguan Tunnel	China (Gansu)	5.250 km (3.262 mi)	2025	2	Kangxian-Lueyang Expressway
Cels	Italy	5.245 km (3.259 mi)	1992		A32
Nalang Tunnel	China (Yunnan)	5.245 km (3.259 mi)	2023	2	Lincang-Qingshuihe Expressway
Alfonso XIII Tunnel (Vielha)	Spain	5.24 km (3.26 mi)	1948; 2007	1	N230
Yanmengguan Tunnel	China (Shanxi)	5.235 km (3.253 mi) (Note: left tube: 5,160m, right tube:5,235m)	2003	2	G55 Erenhot-Guangzhou Expressway
Xiaba Tunnel	China (Guizhou)	5.235 km (3.253 mi)	2024	2	G76_{21} Nayong-Xingyi Expressway
Juan Carlos I Tunnel (New Vielha)	Spain	5.23 km (3.25 mi)	2007	1	N230
Cankurtaran Tunnel	Turkey	5.228 km (3.2 mi)	2018	2	D.010
Yuquanxi Tunnel	China (Hubei)	5.228 km (3.249 mi) (Note: left tube: 5,107m, right tube: 5,228m)	2009	2	G50 Shanghai–Chongqing Expressway
Lianhushan #1 Tunnel	China (Guangdong)	5.225 km (3.247 mi) (Note: left tube: 5,190m, right tube:5,225m)	2016	2	G15_{23} Ningbo-Dongguan Expressway
Hulusi Tunnel	China (Yunnan)	5.215 km (3.240 mi)	2024	2	Mangshi-Lianghe Expressway
Chenghaihu #1 Tunnel	China (Yunnan)	5.205 km (3.234 mi)	2024	2	G42_{16} Chengdu-Lijiang Expressway
Tongluoshan Tunnel	China (Sichuan)	5.197 km (3.229 mi)	2008	2	G42 Shanghai–Chengdu Expressway
Longwan #2 Tunnel	China (Guangxi)	5.195 km (3.228 mi)	2023	2	S30 Hezhou-Bama Expressway
Sachseln	Switzerland	5.191 km (3.226 mi)	1997	1	A8
Baimaxueshan #1 Tunnel	China (Yunnan)	5.180 km (3.219 mi)	2016	1	China National Highway G214
Hexin Tunnel	China (Fujian)	5.180 km (3.219 mi) (Note: left tube: 5,165m, right tube:5,180m)	2015	2	G76 Xiamen–Chengdu Expressway
Zilinshan Tunnel	China (Guizhou)	5.177 km (3.217 mi) (Note: left tube: 5,177m, right tube:5,160m)	2019	2	Yuqing-Anlong Expressway
Hengshan Tunnel	China (Shanxi)	5.170 km (3.2 mi)	2012	2	G18 Rongcheng–Wuhai Expressway
Suoguxiuzhai Tunnel	China (Sichuan)	5.167 km (3.211 mi)	2022	2	G85_{13} Pingliang-Mianyang Expressway
Lancang Tunnel	China (Yunnan)	5.144 km (3.196 mi)	2021	2	Simao-Lancang Expressway
Majiazhai Tunnel	China (Yunnan)	5.143 km (3.196 mi) (Note: left tube: 5,067m, right tube:5,143m)	2023	2	Lincang-Qingshuihe Expressway
Lianhuashan #2 Tunnel	China (Guangdong)	5.140 km (3.194 mi) (Note: left tube: 5,140m, right tube:5,108m)	2016	2	G15_{23} Ningbo-Dongguan Expressway
Dalian Bay Undersea Tunnel	China (Liaoning)	5.140 km (3.194 mi)	2023	2	
Gongtong Tunnel	China (Guizhou)	5.133 km (3.189 mi)	2024	2	G76_{21} Nayong-Xingyi Expressway
Schmitten	Austria	5.111 km (3.176 mi)	1996	1	311
Pingtian Tunnel	China (Guangxi)	5.110 km (3.175 mi) (Note: left tube: 5,110m, right tube: 5,105m)	2020	2	Datang-Pubei Expressway
Changshan Tunnel	China (Sichuan)	5.106 km (3.173 mi) (Note: left tube: 5,068m, right tube: 5,106m)	2013	2	S66 Longchang-Hanyuan Expressway
Taoziya Tunnel	China (Guizhou)	5.100 km (3.169 mi)	2021	2	Zheng'an-Xishui Expressway
Roppen	Austria	5.095 km (3.166 mi)	1990	1	E60/A12
Tianshui #1 Tunnel	China (Gansu)	5.094 km (3.165 mi)	2021	2	G85_{13} Pingliang–Mianyang Expressway
Pingqiao Tunnel	China (Chongqing)	5.093 km (3.165 mi)	2021	2	G55_{15} Zhangjiajie-Nanchong Expressway
Baitacun Tunnel	China (Yunnan)	5.090 km (3.163 mi)	2023	2	G56_{12} Dali-Lincang Expressway
Baoding #1 Tunnel	China (Sichuan)	5.087 km (3.161 mi)	2020	2	Panzhihua-Dali Expressway
Freifjord	Norway	5.086 km (3.160 mi)	1992	1	70
Fenjieliang Tunnel	China (Chongqing)	5.085 km (3.160 mi) (Note: left tube: 5085m right tube:5080m)	2010	2	G42 Shanghai–Chengdu Expressway
Zhuge Tunnel	China (Guizhou)	5.083 km (3.158 mi)	2019	2	G76_{11} Duyun-Shangri-la Expressway
Caihongling Tunnel	China (Guangdong)	5.068 km (3.149 mi)	2007	1	Shuanghe Highway
Cili Tunnel	China (Hunan)	5.060 km (3.144 mi)	2025	2	G59 Hohhot–Beihai Expressway
Baehuryeong Tunnel	South Korea (Gangwon Province)	5.057 km (3.1 mi)	2012	1	National Highway 46
Flenja	Norway	5.053 km (3.140 mi)	1986	1	E16
Hualongshan Tunnel	China (Shaanxi)	5.053 km (3.140 mi) (Note: left tube: 5,053m, right tube: 5,053m)	2020	2	G69_{11} Ankang-Laifeng Expressway
Anzob Tunnel	Tajikistan	5.04 km (3.13 mi)	2006	1	
Taishi Tunnel	China (Gansu)	5.028 km (3.124 mi) (Note: left tube: 5,028m, right tube: 4,984m)	2014	2	G85_{13} Pingliang–Mianyang Expressway
Cadí	Spain	5.026 km (3.123 mi)	1984	1	E09/16
Pingdingshan Tunnel	China (Hebei)	5.024 km (3.122 mi) (Note: left tube: 5,000m, right tube: 5,024m)	2015	2	G95 Capital Area Loop Expressway
Tongluoshan Tunnel	China (Sichuan)	5.024 km (3.122 mi)	2017	2	G55_{15} Zhangjiajie-Nanchong Expressway
Huayingshan Tunnel	China (Chongqing)	5.018 km (3.118 mi) (Note: left tube: 5,018m, right tube: 5,000m)	2017	2	G85 Yinchuan-Kunming Expressway
Taoguan #2 Tunnel	China (Sichuan)	5.015 km (3.116 mi) (Note: left tube: 5,014m, right tube: 5,015m)	2012	2	G42_{17} Chengdu-Changdu Expressway
Yinjiping Tunnel	China (Sichuan)	5.015 km (3.116 mi)	2022	2	Emei-Hanyuan Expressway
Xinlinpu Tunnel	China (Hebei)	5.012 km (3.114 mi) (Note: left tube: 5,012m, right tube:4,998m)	2019	2	S38_{01} Beijing-Chongli Expressway
Shantou Bay Tunnel	China (Guangdong)	5.010 km (3.113 mi)	2022	2	China National Highway G324
Dafengkou Tunnel	China (Chongqing)	5.003 km (3.109 mi)	2013	2	G42 Shanghai–Chengdu Expressway
Dabanshan Tunnel	China (Qinghai)	5.000 km (3.107 mi) (Note: left tube: 4,965m, right tube:5,000m)	2019	2	China National Highway G569
Bijiashan Tunnel	China (Chongqing)	5.000 km (3.107 mi)	2023	2	G69_{11} Ankang-Laifeng Expressway
Tuen Mun–Chek Lap Kok Link Northern Connection	Hong Kong (New Territories) (Pillar Point - Chek Lap Kok)	5.0 km (3.1 mi)	2020	2	

=== Under construction ===
Name	Location	Kilometres (km)	Expected completion	Tubes	Road
Rogfast	Norway (Stavanger)	26.7 km (16.6 mi)	2031	2	European route E39
Yuexi Tunnel	China (Sichuan)	18.39 km (11.427 mi)	2031	2	S71 Sichuan Jingkouhe-Xichang Expressway
Bypass Stockholm	Sweden(Stockholm)	18 km (11.2 mi)	2030	2	E4
Fehmarn Belt tunnel	Denmark/Germany (Fehmarn Belt)	17.6 km (10.9 mi)	2029	5 (2 of which for road traffic)	European route E47
Tokyo Gaikan Tunnel	Japan(Tokyo)	16.2 km (10.1 mi)	2030	2	C3 Tokyo Gaikan Expressway
West Tianshan Tunnel	China (Xinjiang)	15.707 km (9.760 mi)	2027	2	China National Highway 219
Jiaozhou Bay 2nd Tunnel	China (Shandong)	14.36 km (8.92 mi)	2027	2	
Yanyuan Tunnel	China (Sichuan)	14.157 km (8.797 mi)	2028	2	G76_{11} Duyun-Shangri-la Expressway
Xiaogaoshan Tunnel	China (Sichuan)	14.032 km (8.7 mi)	2028	2	G76_{11} Duyun-Shangri-la Expressway
Zoji-la Tunnel	India (Jammu Kashmir)	14.2 km (8.8 mi)	2028	1	Srinagar-Kargil-Leh highway
NSC Expressway Tunnel	Singapore	12.5 km (7.8 mi) (Note: tunnel section of NSC are (10.4 km), while sub-surface section is (2.1km))	2031	1	North-South Corridor, Singapore
Fengjian Tunnel	China (Chongqing - Hubei)	12.360 km (7.7 mi)	2026	2	G69_{11} Ankang-Laifeng Expressway
Mengpeng Tunnel	China (Yunnan)	12.205 km (7.6 mi)	2028	2	Ruili-Menglian Expressway
Gongjuegaoshan Tunnel	China (Sichuan)	12.095 km (7.5 mi)	2026	2	G76_{11} Duyun-Shangri-la Expressway
Muli Tunnel	China (Sichuan)	11.825 km (7.348 mi)	2028	2	G76_{11} Duyun-Shangri-la Expressway Muli Branch
Murovdagh Tunnel	Azerbaijan (Göygöl-Kalbajar)	11.700 km (7.3 mi)	2025	2	European route E60
Changbai Tunnel	China (Sichuan)	11.446 km (7.1 mi)	2028	2	G76_{11} Duyun-Shangri-la Expressway
Xiamaidi Tunnel	China (Sichuan)	11.440 km (7.1 mi)	2028	2	G76_{11} Duyun-Shangri-la Expressway
Haitai Yangtse River Tunnel	China (Jiangsu)	11.185 km (7.0 mi)	2028	2	S13 Tongzhouwan-Changshu Expressway
Taiyueshan Tunnel	China (Shanxi)	11.180 km (6.9 mi)	2025	2	G22_{11} Changzhi-Yan'an Expressway
Jinyang Tunnel	China (Sichuan)	11.095 km (6.9 mi)	2025	2	G76_{11} Duyun-Shangri-la Expressway
Hejian #1 Tunnel	China (Yunnan)	11.036 km (6.9 mi) (Note: Left tube: 10,983m, Right tube: 11,036m)	2025	2	Heqing-Jianchuan-Lanping Expressway
Wuhan Lianghu East Lake Tunnel	China (Hubei)	11 km (6.8 mi)	??	2	
Dengloushan Tunnel	China (Yunnan)	10.990 km (6.8 mi) (Note: left tube: 10,990m, right tube: 10,922m)	2025	2	G80_{12} Mile-Chuxiong Expressway
Jintang Under Sea Road Tunnel	China (Zhejiang)	10.990 km (6.8 mi)	2026	2	Zhejiang Dinghai-Daishan Expressway
Mianya Tunnel	China (Sichuan)	10.581 km (6.6 mi)	2028	2	G76_{11} Duyun-Shangri-la Expressway
Yunlingxuebangshan Tunnel	China (Yunnan)	10.535 km (6.5 mi) (Note: left tube: 10,990m, right tube: 10,922m)	2025	2	Heqing-Jianchuan-Lanping Expressway
Daliangshan Tunnel	China (Yunnan)	10.235 km (6.4 mi) (Note: left tube: 10,235m, right tube: 10,210m)	2025	2	G56_{12} Dali-Lincang Expressway
Chongde Tunnel	Taiwan (Hualien)	10.2 km (6.3 mi)	2032	2	Provincial Highway 9, Suhua Highway
Cuiping Tunnel	China (Yunnan)	10.127 km (6.3 mi) (Note: left tube: 10,127m, right tube: 10,046m)	2025	2	G76_{11} Duyun-Shangri-la Expressway
Dajing Tunnel	China (Sichuan)	10.059 km (6.3 mi)	2027	2	Sichuan S71 Xichang-Ningnan Expressway
Niutoushan Tunnel	China (Zhejiang)	9.970 km (6.2 mi)	2028	2	Yiwu-Longquan-Qingyuan Expressway
Gongga Tunnel	China (Sichuan)	9.961 km (6.2 mi)	2026	1	G549 National Highway
Jingping Tunnel	China (Sichuan)	9.930 km (6.170 mi)	2025	2	G42_{16} Chengdu-Lijiang Expressway
Azhahe #1 Tunnel	China (Yunnan)	9.885 km (6.1 mi)	2025	2	Yunnan Border Expressway
Lüliangshan Tunnel	China (Shanxi)	9.806 km (6.093 mi)	2025	2	Xiyang-Qikou Expressway
Baiyunshan Tunnel	China (Hubei)	9.785 km (6.080 mi)	2026	2	G59_{12} Fangxian-Wufeng Expressway
Toyo Tunnel	Colombia	9.73 km (6.0 mi)	2027	1	Pan-American Highway, Ruta Nacional 62
Mopanshan Tunnel	China (Sichuan)	9.650 km (6.0 mi)	2028	2	G76_{11} Duyun-Shangri-la Expressway
Ningqiao Tunnel	China (Sichuan)	9.103 km (5.656 mi)	2025	2	G42_{16} Chengdu-Lijiang Expressway
Wudongde Tunnel	China (Sichuan)	8.922 km (5.5 mi)	2026	2	Sichuan Huili-Luquan Expressway
Paomashan #1 Tunnel	China (Sichuan)	8.865 km (5.508 mi)	2025	2	G42_{18} Ya'an-Yecheng Expressway
Kvesheti-Kobi Tunnel	Georgia	8.860 km (5.505 mi)	2028	1	S3 Mtskheta-Stepantsminda-Larsi
Tiefengshan Tunnel	China (Chongqing)	8.648 km (5.374 mi)	2026	2	G50_{12} Enshi-Guangyuan Expressway
Huimin Tunnel	China (Yunnan)	8.475 km (5.266 mi)	2025	2	Yunnan Border Expressway
Zheduoshan Tunnel	China (Sichuan)	8.427 km (5.236 mi)	2027	2	G42_{18} Ya'an-Yecheng Expressway
Namhansanseong Tunnel	South Korea	8.338 km (5.181 mi)	2022	2	Sejong-Pocheon Expressway
Yinggeling Tunnel	China (Yainannan)	8.282 km (5.146 mi)	2027	2	Shiyun-Baisha Expressway
Ningnan Tunnel	China (Sichuan)	8.258 km (5.131 mi)	2025	2	G42_{16} Chengdu-Lijiang Expressway
Bangfu Tunnel	China (Yunnan)	8.200 km (5.1 mi)	2025	2	Yongde-Mengjian Expressway
Zhuazi #3 Tunnel	China (Sichuan)	8.150 km (5.1 mi)	2027	2	G76_{11} Duyun-Shangrila Expressway
Siguxi Tunnel	China (Sichuan)	8.129 km (5.1 mi)	2025	2	G42_{16} Chengdu-Lijiang Expressway
Shengdaoling Tunnel	China (Shaanxi)	8.060 km (5.008 mi)	2025	2	Hancheng-Huanglong Expressway
Wuhan Lianghu South Lake Tunnel	China (Hubei)	8 km (5.0 mi)	2025	2	
Liangwangshan Tunnel	China (Yunnan)	7.978 km (5.0 mi)	2025	2	Kunming-Yiliang Expressway
Karawanks (tube 2)	Slovenia / Austria	7.948 km (4.939 mi)	2026	1	Karawanken Autobahn
Wuliangshan Tunnel	China (Yunnan)	7.895 km (4.906 mi)	2025	2	G56_{15} Tianbao-Houqiao Expressway
Nanyanshan Tunnel	China (Zhejiang)	7.833 km (4.867 mi)	2028	2	Yiwu-Longquan-Qingyuan Expressway
Yangzong Tunnel	China (Yunnan)	7.770 km (4.8 mi)	2025	2	Kunming-Yiliang Expressway
Lichitian Tunnel	China (Sichuan)	7.604 km (4.7 mi)	2027	2	G42_{16} Chengdu-Lijiang Expressway
Wuliangshan Tunnel	China (Yunnan)	7.528 km (4.7 mi)	2025	2	G56_{15} Tianbao-Houqiao Expressway
Caochiping Tunnel	China (Hubei)	7.515 km (4.7 mi)	2026	2	G59_{12} Fangxian-Wufeng Expressway
Xiangda Tunnel	China (Yunnan)	7.467 km (4.640 mi)	2026	2	Ruili-Menglian Expressway
Aikeng Tunnel	China (Xinjiang)	7.445 km (4.626 mi)	2026	2	China National Highway 218
Dapingshan Tunnel	China (Zhejiang)	7.305 km (4.539 mi)	2026	2	Cangnan-Taishun Expressway
Gewa Tunnel	China (Yunnan)	7.148 km (4.442 mi)	2027	2	G76_{11} Duyun-Shangri-la Expressway
Dahuashan Tunnel	China (Yunnan)	7.130 km (4.430 mi)	2027	2	G76_{11} Duyun-Shangri-la Expressway
Yimoluo Tunnel	China (Sichuan)	7.087 km (4.404 mi)	2025	2	G42_{16} Chengdu-Lijiang Expressway
Onuma Tunnel	Japan (Hokkaido)	7.042 km (4.376 mi)	2029	1	E5 Dō-Ō Expressway
Lishan Tunnel	China (Zhejiang)	6.998 km (4.348 mi)	2027	2	Qingtian-Wencheng Expressway
Dulagezan Tunnel	China (Yunnan)	6.930 km (4.306 mi) (Note: left tube: 6,930m, right tube: 6,887m)	2025	2	S226 Provincial Road
Longlongba Tunnel	China (Yunnan)	6.875 km (4.272 mi)	2025	2	Simao-Jiangcheng Expressway
Paomashan #2 Tunnel	China (Sichuan)	6.772 km (4.208 mi)	2021	2	G42_{18} Ya'an-Yecheng Expressway
Xiaba Tunnel	China (Sichuan)	6.678 km (4.150 mi)	2025	2	G42_{16} Chengdu-Lijiang Expressway
Huangjiaoping Tunnel	China (Sichuan)	6.586 km (4.092 mi)	2025	2	G42_{16} Chengdu-Lijiang Expressway
Buran Tunnel	China (Xinjiang)	6.558 km (4.075 mi)	2026	2	China National Highway G341
Huayingshan Tunnel	China (Chongqing)	6.540 km (4.064 mi)	2025	2	Guang'an-Linshui Rapid Road
North East Link	Australia (Melbourne)	6.5 km (4.0 mi)	2028	2	North East Link
Western Harbour Tunnel	Australia (Sydney)	6.5 km (4.0 mi)	2028	2	M8 Motorway (Sydney)
Wufu Tunnel	China (Chongqing)	6.454 km (4.010 mi)	2026	2	G50_{12} Enshi-Guangyuan Expressway
Baolongping Tunnel	China (Chongqing, Sichuan)	6.450 km (4.008 mi)	2025	2	Chongqing-Chishui-Xuyong Expressway
Jiangyin-Jingjiang Yangtse River Tunnel	China (Jiangsu)	6.445 km (4.005 mi)	2025	2	S229 Provincial Road
Chang Su	South Korea	6.430 km (3.995 mi)	??		
Gaoyuzui Tunnel	China (Shanxi)	6.416 km (3.987 mi)	2025	2	Xixiang-Qikou Expressway
Yayang Tunnel	China (Zhejiang)	6.381 km (3.965 mi)	2026	2	Cangnan-Taishun Expressway
Jiuling Tunnel	China (Hubei)	6.264 km (3.892 mi)	2026	2	G59_{12} Fangxian-Wufeng Expressway
Ma'anshan Tunnel	China (Sichuan)	6.252 km (3.885 mi)	2025	2	G42_{16} Chengdu-Lijiang Expressway
Ruhamo Tunnel	China (Sichuan)	6.135 km (3.8 mi)	2026	2	G76_{11} Duyun-Shangri-la Expressway
Maojiagou Tunnel	China (Sichuan)	6.120 km (3.8 mi)	2025	2	G42_{18} Ya'an-Yecheng Expressway
Jinhae Tunnel	South Korea	6.085 km (3.986 mi)	??	2	Korean national highway 2
Hetaoping Tunne	China (Sichuan)	6.063 km (3.767 mi)	2025	2	G42_{16} Chengdu-Lijiang Expressway
Caoziping Tunnel	China (Sichuan)	6.050 km (3.759 mi)	2028	2	G76_{11} Duyun-Shangri-la Expressway Muli Branch
Zhawu Tunnel	China (Yunnan)	5.950 km (3.697 mi)	2025	2	Ruilin-Menglian Expressway
Wulongguan Tunnel	China (Hubei)	5.943 km (3.693 mi)	2026	2	G59_{12} Fangxian-Wufeng Expressway
Yuanbaoshan Yunnel	China (Sichuan)	5.747 km (3.571 mi)	2025	2	G42_{16} Chengdu-Lijiang Expressway
Zhulinwan Tunnel	China (Sichuan)	5.741 km (3.567 mi)	2025	2	G42_{16} Chengdu-Lijiang Expressway
Tunnel Hranjen	Bosnia and Herzegovina (Goražde)	5.700 km (3.542 mi)	2027	1 (Note: 1 tube + 1 service tube 5,490 m))	European route E761
Yongdong Tunnel	China (Yunnan)	5.515 km (3.4 mi)	2025	2	Ruili-Menglian Expressway
Daliangshan Tunnel	China (Yunnan)	5.500 km (3.4 mi)	2025	2	Zhengkang-Qingshuihe Expressway
Baidicheng Tunnel	China (Chongqing)	5.446 km (3.4 mi)	2025	2	G69_{11} Ankang-Laifeng Expressway
Cheonwangsan Tunnel	South Korea	5.433 km (3.376 mi)	2022	2	Hamyang-Ulsan Expressway
Laoyingpan #1 Tunnel	China (Sichuan)	5.355 km (3.327 mi)	2025	2	G76_{11} Duyun-Shangri-la Expressway
Daqiaowan Tunnel	China (Sichuan)	5.335 km (3.315 mi)	2025	2	G42_{18} Ya'an-Yecheng Expressway
Haizishan #1 Tunnel	China (Sichuan)	5.319 km (3.305 mi)	2025	2	G06_{15} Delingha-Maerkang Expressway
Hejian #2 Tunnel	China (Yunnan)	5.310 km (3.3 mi)	2025	2	Heqing-Jianchuan-Lanping Expressway
Taibaishan Tunnel	China (Shaanxi)	5.277 km (3.279 mi)	2025	2	Meixian-Taibai Expressway
Hulusi Tunnel	China (Yunnan)	5.215 km (3.240 mi)	2025	2	Mangshi-Lianghe Expressway
Muerguashan Tunnel	China (Sichuan)	5.155 km (3.203 mi)	2026	1	China National Highway G549
Daxiemachang Tunnel	China (Yunnan)	5.132 km (3.189 mi)	2025	2	Pu'er-Zhengjing Expressway
Chaoyang Tunnel	China (Chongqing)	5.132 km (3.189 mi)	2025	2	Wushan-Yunxian-Kaizhou Expressway
Lixian Tunnel	China (Gansu)	5.114 km (3.178 mi)	2025	2	Jingtai-Lixian Expressway
Zhugeling Tunnel	China (Zhejiang)	5.103 km (3.171 mi)	2027	2	Qingtian-Wencheng Expressway
Laoyingpan #2 Tunnel	China (Sichuan)	5.030 km (3.125 mi)	2025	2	G76_{11} Duyun-Shangri-la Expressway
Tainiuhu Tunnel	China (Zhejiang)	5.015 km (3.116 mi)	2028	2	Cangnan-Taishun Expressway

== Timeline of world record lengths ==
Record	Name	Location	Length
2000 –	Lærdal Tunnel	Norway (Lærdalsøyri - Aurlandsvangen)	24.51 km (15.23 mi)
1980 – 2000	Gotthard Road Tunnel	Switzerland (Uri - Ticino)	16.918 km (10.5 mi)
1978 – 1980	Arlberg Road Tunnel	Austria (Vorarlberg - Tyrol)	13.972 km (8.7 mi)
1965 – 1978	Mont Blanc Tunnel	France- Italy (Alps)	11.611 km (7.2 mi)
1964 – 1965	Great St Bernard Tunnel	Italy - Switzerland	5.798 km (3.603 mi)
1948 – 1964	Vielha Tunnel	Spain	5.240 km (3.256 mi)
1934 – 1948	Queensway Tunnel	United Kingdom (Merseyside)	3.24 km (2.01 mi)
1882 – 1934	Col de Tende Road Tunnel	France - Italy (Col de Tende)	3.182 km (1.977 mi)

== See also ==
- List of longest tunnels
- List of long tunnels by type
- List of long road tunnels in China
