= Toyo =

Toyo may refer to:

== Places ==
- Tōyō, Kōchi, a town in Japan
- Tōyo, Ehime, a former city in Japan
- Toyo Province, a Japanese province divided in 683
- Tōyō, Kumamoto, a village located in Yatsuhiro District, Kumamoto, Japan
- Tōyō, Tokyo, a neighborhood in Koto, Tokyo
- Toyo, first capital of the Habr Yunis Sultanate in Africa

== People ==
- Mr. Toyo (stagename) ringname of wrestler Rusher Kimura

=== Given name ===
- Toyo Ito (born 1941), Japanese architect
- Toyo Mitunobu (1897–1944), Japanese rear admiral
- Sesshū Tōyō (1420–1506), Japanese master of ink and wash painting
- Toyo Shibata (柴田 トヨ, 1911–2013), Japanese poet
- Yoshida Tōyō (吉田 東洋, 1816–1862), Japanese samurai
- Toyo (queen), Queen of Yamataikoku

== Surname ==
- Javier Toyo (born 1977), Venezuelan football goalkeeper
- Mohamed Khir Toyo (born 1965), former Dato' Menteri Besar (Chief Minister) of the state of Selangor in Malaysia

== Corporations ==
- Toyo Engineering Corporation, an engineering, procurement and construction company serving mainly the hydrocarbons and petrochemical sectors worldwide
- Toyo Tires, a tire company based in Japan
- Toyo Kogyo, Japanese carmaker known since 1984 as Mazda

== Other uses ==
- Toyo University, a university with several branches in Japan
- Toyo College of Food Technology, a private junior college in Kawanishi, Hyōgo, Japan
- Tōyō Rapid Railway Line, a commuter rail line owned by Tōyō Rapid Railway Co., Ltd.
- Tōyō kanji, the official form of kanji or Japanese written characters from 1946 to 1981
- Toyo, the largest size of Siku, a traditional big bass pan flute from the Andes
- Toyo Harada, a Valiant Comics character
- Toyo, a soy sauce-based product popular in the Philippines
- Toyo straw, a shiny, smooth straw made in Japan from rice paper and used for fedora hats
- Toyo Tunnel, a road tunnel under construction in Colombia that will be the longest in the Americas when completed
