= Gotthard Road Tunnel =

Tunnel beneath the Swiss Alps

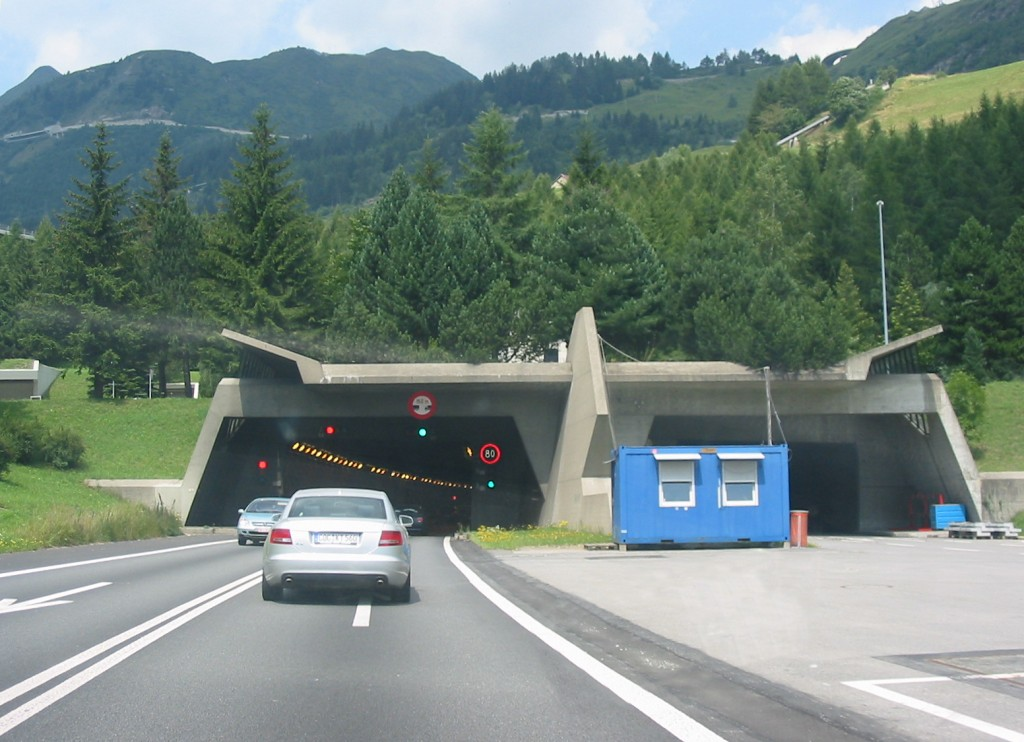
- The south entrance of Gotthard Road Tunnel
- Interactive map of Gotthard Road Tunnel

Overview
- Location: Switzerland
- Coordinates: 46°40′18″N 8°35′33″E
- Route: A2
- Start: Göschenen, Uri (north)
- End: Airolo, Ticino (south)

Operation
- Constructed: 5 May 1970
- Opened: 5 September 1980
- Owner: Swiss Confederation
- Operator: Amt für Betrieb der Nationalstrassen of the cantons of Uri, Ticino, Nidwalden, and Schwyz
- Traffic: Automotive
- Toll: none (included in the mandatory Vignette)
- Vehicles per day: 17354 (2014)

Technical
- Length: 16.942 kilometres (10.527 mi)
- No. of lanes: 2
- Operating speed: 80 km/h (50 mph)
- Max elevation: 1,175 m (3,855 ft) (inside the tunnel)
- Min elevation: 1,080 m (3,540 ft) (north portal)

The Gotthard Road Tunnel in Switzerland runs from Göschenen in the canton of Uri at its northern portal, to Airolo in Ticino to the south, and is 16.9 kilometres (10.5 mi) in length below the St Gotthard Pass, a major pass of the Alps. At time of construction, in 1980, it was the longest road tunnel in the world; it is currently the seventh-longest. Although it is a motorway tunnel, part of the A2 from Basel to Chiasso, it consists of only one bidirectional tube with two lanes. With a maximum elevation of 1,175 metres (3,855 ft) at the tunnel's highest point, the A2 motorway has the lowest maximum elevation of any direct north-south road through the Alps.

The tunnel rises from the northern portal at Göschenen (1,080 m (3,540 ft)) and the culminating point is reached after approximately 8 kilometres (5.0 mi). After 10.3 kilometres (6.4 mi) from the northern portal there is the border between the cantons of Uri and Ticino; after another 6.7 kilometres (4.2 mi), the tunnel ends at the southern portal near Airolo (1,146 m (3,760 ft)). The journey takes about 13 minutes by car, the maximum speed being 80 km/h (50 mph).

The Gotthard Road Tunnel is one of the three tunnels that connect the Swiss Plateau to southern Switzerland and run under the Gotthard Massif, the two other being railway tunnels, the Gotthard Tunnel (1882) and the Gotthard Base Tunnel (2016). All three tunnels bypass the Gotthard Pass, an important trade route since the 13th century. The pass road culminates about 1,000 metres (3,300 ft) above the tunnel, at a height of 2,106 metres (6,909 ft), and is only passable in summer.

== History ==
In response to the automobile boom in Switzerland, the Swiss government gave approval in July 1969 for the construction of the 17-kilometre (11 mi) Gotthard Road tunnel. The tunnel would be longer than any existing road tunnel, and would provide a year-round road link from the Swiss Plateau to southern Switzerland, and from northern to southern Europe as well, to be used in place of the Gotthard Pass. The tunnel was built roughly parallel to the old railway tunnel, with portals a few hundred metres away from those of the railway. Prior to the opening of the tunnel, cars were transported through the nearby railway tunnel on car shuttle trains. Following the catastrophic fire in the road tunnel in 2001, car shuttle trains resumed operations for a few weeks.

The tunnel was opened on 5 September 1980. It remains a single bore tunnel with just one lane operating in each direction. It has four large ventilation shafts and an additional side gallery between 10 and 18 metres (33 and 59 ft) from the main tunnel, having its own independent ventilation system in order to facilitate the cutting of a second tunnel, should future traffic levels require it.

On 11 September 2023, the tunnel was temporarily closed after a crack was discovered on the ceiling. The tunnel reopened on 14 September.

=== 2001 collision and fire ===
On 24 October 2001, a collision of two trucks created a fire in the tunnel, killing eleven and injuring many more, the smoke and gases from the fires being the main cause of death. The tunnel was closed for two months after the accident for repair and cleaning, reopening 21 December 2001. Since the fire, no more than 150 trucks per hour are allowed to enter the tunnel.

=== Planned second road tunnel ===
In March 2014, the Swiss Government approved a bill to allow the building of a second road tunnel. Construction was scheduled to start in 2020, with the cost estimated at almost CHF 3 billion. Construction on a second, parallel road tunnel was started. In first instance it was only built for safety: an escape route in case of accidents. This second tunnel is now to be built out to a full road tunnel, potentially allowing four lanes of traffic. Efforts to do this initially failed, blocked by political resistance. The Alpine Initiative "for the protection of the Alpine region from transit traffic", which raised barriers against road tunnel construction, was initially blocked by the Swiss Parliament. A February 1994 Alpine Initiative passed (with 52% of the vote), and Parliament upheld the referendum twice through the 1990s. The pro-tunnel Avanti Initiative brought a referendum to voters in February 2004, which was rejected (by 62.8%).

The Swiss government announced in September 2013 it had approved a plan to upgrade the second tunnel into a full road tunnel in order to allow for the necessary reconstruction of the first road tunnel. Once the works on the first tunnel are finished, the Swiss government plans to operate one single lane in each tunnel (northbound traffic in the newly constructed tunnel, southbound traffic in the renovated one) in order to maintain the current tunnel overall capacity, in compliance with the Swiss constitutional norm that forbids a further growth of the traffic capacity across the Alps.

The reconstruction would have lasted for several years in any variant – one variant would push the traffic over the mountain pass, another proposed to load the vehicles onto trains with a new terminal, a third would close the tunnel for several months every year over time range of a decade. All of these have their drawbacks and the usage of the second tunnel was chosen as the best option to allow for the reconstruction. Further usage of both tunnels was subject to a popular referendum that was held in February 2016, where it was approved. The actual upgrade mining of the second road tunnel was planned to last from 2020 to 2027 at a cost of 2.7 billion francs for the whole project including the following reconstruction of the first tunnel.

Work on an access tunnel started in September 2021, and a major contract for the project was awarded in August 2022. A joint venture between Frutiger, Implenia and Webuild & CSC SA were hired to construct the new tube and a parallel access tunnel. As of 2023, the access tunnel was under construction, while work on the road tunnel was to commence in 2025. The works are scheduled to be completed in 2029. The original tunnel will then close for refurbishment, reopening alongside the new tunnel upon completion of the improvement project in 2032.

== Rail tunnels ==
The 15 km (9.3 mi) Gotthard Rail Tunnel, close to but separate from the expressway tunnel, handles rail traffic on the north-south line in Switzerland. It was opened in 1882, at the time the world's longest tunnel, though later superseded by longer tunnels, some over 50 km (31 mi) long.

Under construction since 2002 and opened on 1 June 2016, the Gotthard Base Tunnel (a second rail tunnel, 57 km [35 mi] long), is the world's longest. It was built for the use of trains travelling from northern Switzerland to the Ticino area and beyond.

== Road conditions ==
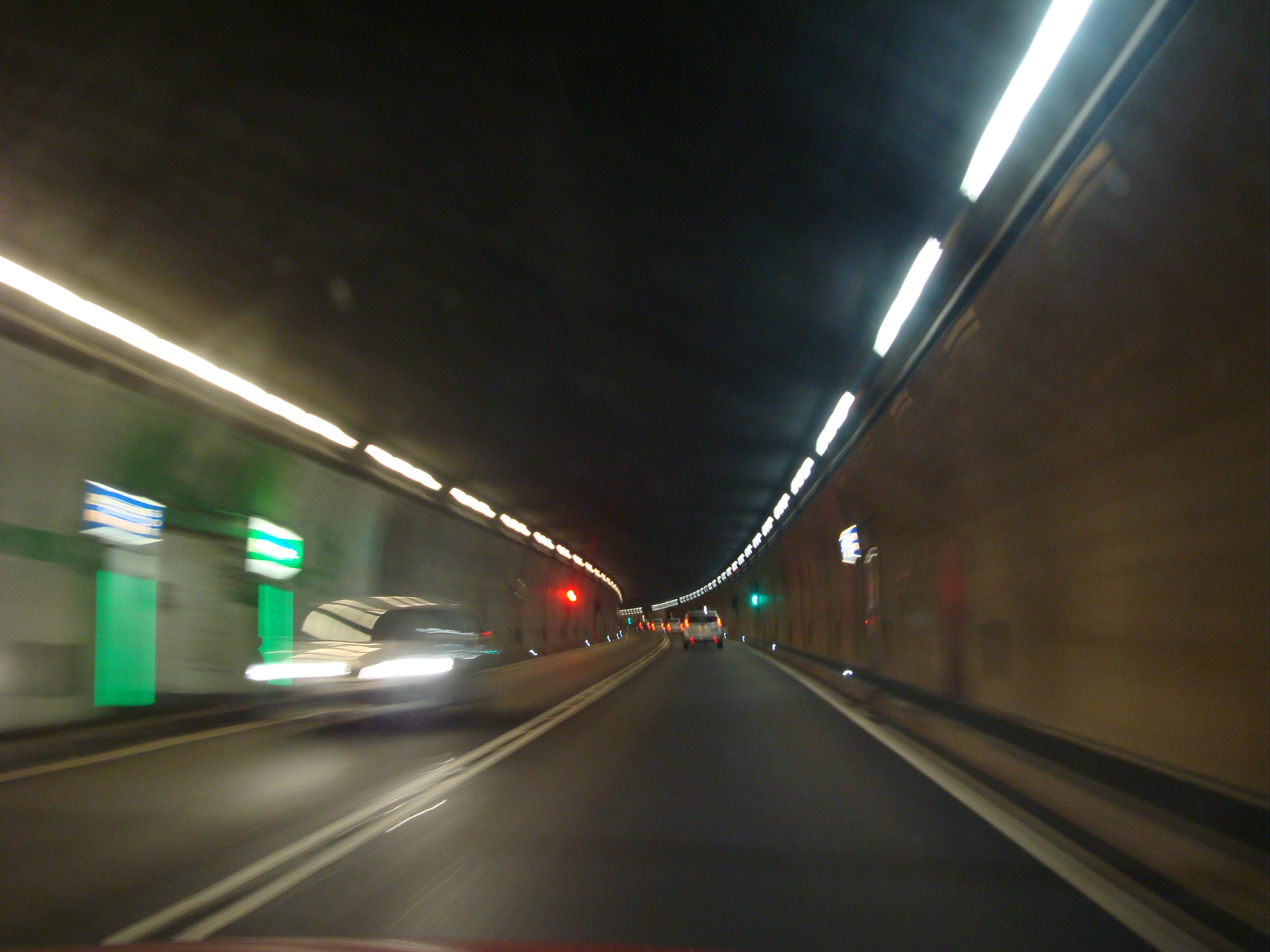
Inside the Gotthard Road Tunnel

The Gotthard Tunnel is the core and culminating point of the A2 motorway in Switzerland, running south from Basel through the tunnel down to Chiasso on the border with Italy. Traffic flows through only one tunnel, which carries traffic both ways, with each direction allocated one lane. Overtaking in the tunnel is prohibited and traffic flow is regulated. The tunnel's speed limit is 80 km/h (50 mph).

Heavily used, the tunnel often has traffic jams during peak holiday seasons over Easter and summer, on both the north and south ends. In contrast, another tunnel through the Alps, the San Bernardino Tunnel tunnel as part of the A13 in the canton of Graubünden further east, is relatively uncongested and shorter.

== See also ==
- List of highest paved roads in Europe#Highest motorways

Records
Preceded by Arlberg Road Tunnel; 13.98 km (8.69 mi)	World's longest road tunnel 1980–2000	Succeeded by Lærdal Tunnel; 24.51 km (15.23 mi)
