= Lærdal Tunnel =

World's longest highway tunnel

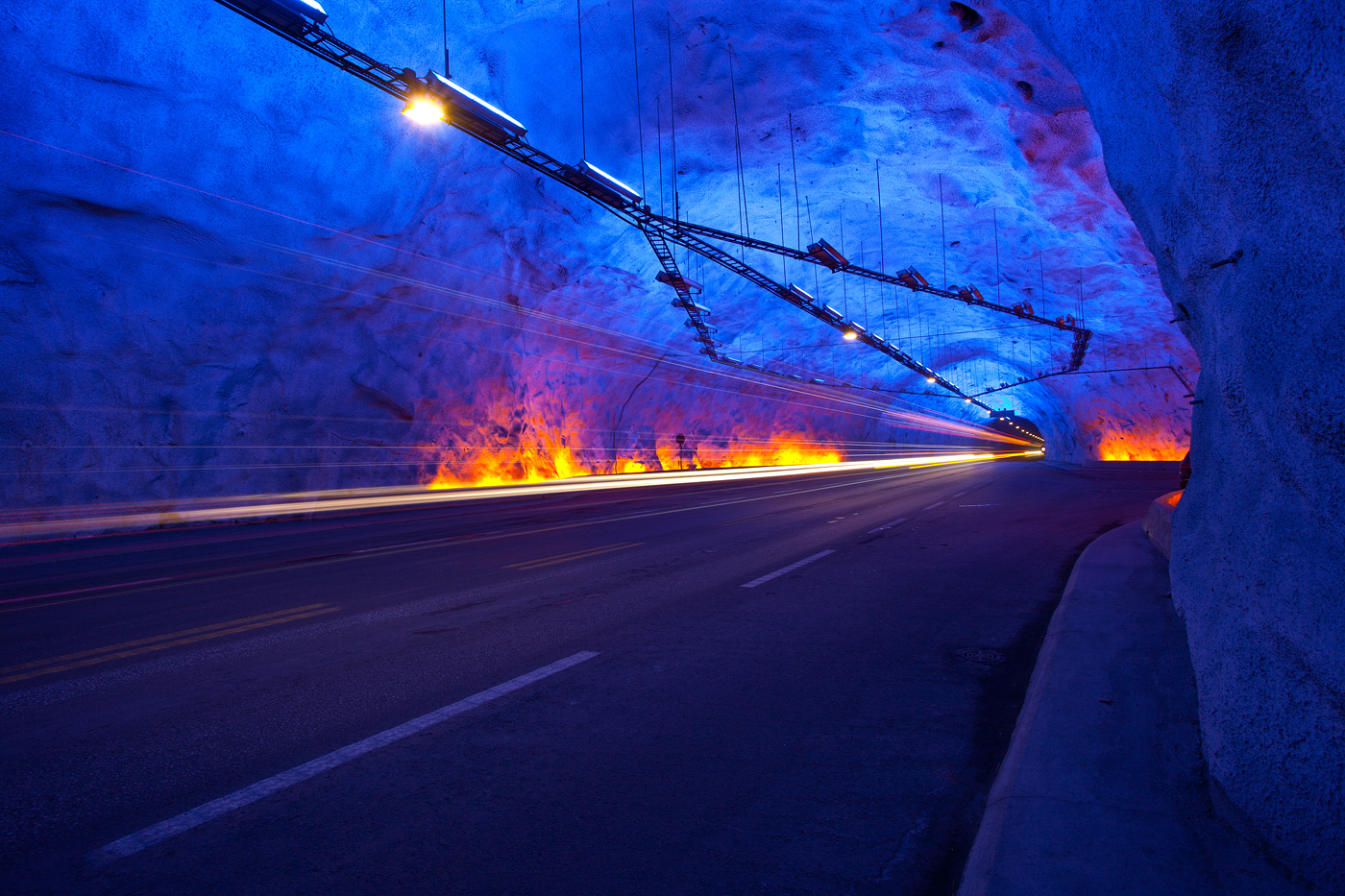
- Interactive map of Lærdal Tunnel

Overview
- Location: Vestland, Norway
- Coordinates: 60°58′19″N 07°22′06″E
- Route: E16

Operation
- Work began: 1995
- Opened: 27 November 2000
- Operator: Norwegian Public Roads Administration
- Character: Road
- Toll: None
- Vehicles per day: 2,050 (2019)

Technical
- Length: 24.51 km (15.23 mi)
- Operating speed: 80 km/h (50 mph)
- Max elevation: 265 m (869 ft)
- Min elevation: 5 m (16 ft)
- Width: 9 m (30 ft)
- Grade: 2.5%

The Lærdal Tunnel (Norwegian: Lærdalstunnelen) is a 24.51-kilometre-long (15.23 mi) road tunnel connecting Lærdal Municipality and Aurland Municipality in Vestland county, Norway; the southwest end of the tunnel is approximately 117 kilometres (73 mi) northeast of Bergen. It carries two lanes of the European Route E16 highway, and was the final link completing the main highway that now enables car travel between Oslo and Bergen with no ferry connections and no difficult mountain crossings during winter. It is the longest road tunnel in the world, followed by WestConnex in Sydney, Australia and Tianshan Shengli Tunnel in Xinjiang, China.

== History ==
In 1975, the Parliament of Norway decided that the main road between Oslo and Bergen would run via Filefjell. In 1992, Parliament confirmed that decision, added that the road should run through a tunnel between Lærdal Municipality and Aurland Municipality, and passed legislation to build the tunnel. Construction started in 1995 and the tunnel opened on 27 November 2000. It cost 1.082 billion Norwegian kroner ($113.1M USD).

Beginning in November 2026, the tunnel will be completely closed for 12 hours each night from 18:00–06:00 due to major construction, so that modern European tunnel safety regulations can be met. The construction and required maintenance is expected to be completed around 2030–2031. Alternative routes such as Fylkesvei 50 are available, but are slower and often closed in winter.

== Design ==
A total of 2,500,000 cubic metres (3,300,000 yd^{3}) of rock was removed from the tunnel during its construction from 1995 to 2000. The tunnel begins just east of Aurlandsvangen in Aurland Municipality, goes under a mountain range, and ends 5.5 kilometres (3.4 mi) south of Lærdalsøyri in Lærdal Municipality. Its design takes into consideration the mental strain of driving through a long tunnel; it is divided into four sections, separated by three large mountain caves (with parking areas available) at 6-kilometre (3.7 mi) intervals. While the main parts of the tunnel have white lights, the caves are lit in blue with yellow at the fringes to give an impression of sunrise. These caves are meant to break the monotony, providing a refreshing view and allowing drivers some relief. They also function as turnaround points, and as break areas to help alleviate claustrophobia during the 20-minute drive through the tunnel. In the tunnel, there are signs every kilometre indicating how many kilometres have already been covered and how many still to go. To alert drivers who become inattentive or start to fall asleep, each lane is supplied with a loud rumble strip towards the centre.

=== Safety ===
The tunnel does not have emergency exits; however, there are many safety precautions in case of accident, fire, or other emergency. Emergency phones marked "SOS" are installed every 250 metres (820 ft) for contacting police, fire departments, and hospitals. Fire extinguishers are placed every 125 metres (410 ft). Whenever an emergency phone is used or a fire extinguisher is lifted, stop lights and electronic signs reading snu og køyr ut (English: turn and exit) are displayed throughout the tunnel, and electronic signs at the entrance show tunnelen stengt (English: tunnel closed). There are fifteen turnaround areas that accommodate buses and semi-trailers. In addition to the three large caverns, emergency niches have been built every 500 metres (1,600 ft). There are photo inspections; security centres in Lærdalsøyri and Bergen keep a count of all vehicles entering and exiting the tunnel. Wiring is installed so that radios and mobile phones do not lose service while inside the tunnel. Speed cameras have been installed because of serious speeding. There are very few other completely straight roads in the region.

=== Air quality ===
Air quality in the tunnel is managed in two ways: ventilation and purification. The Lærdal Tunnel is the first in the world to be equipped with an air treatment plant, located in a 100-metre (330 ft)-wide cavern about 9.5 kilometres (5.9 mi) northwest of Aurlandsvangen. Air from the tunnel is drawn into the plant by two large fans, particulates (dust and soot) are removed by an electrostatic filter, and nitrogen dioxide is removed by a large carbon filter. In addition, large ventilation fans draw fresh air in through both entrances, and air from the middle of the tunnel is expelled through a ventilation shaft to Tynjadalen.

== Media gallery ==
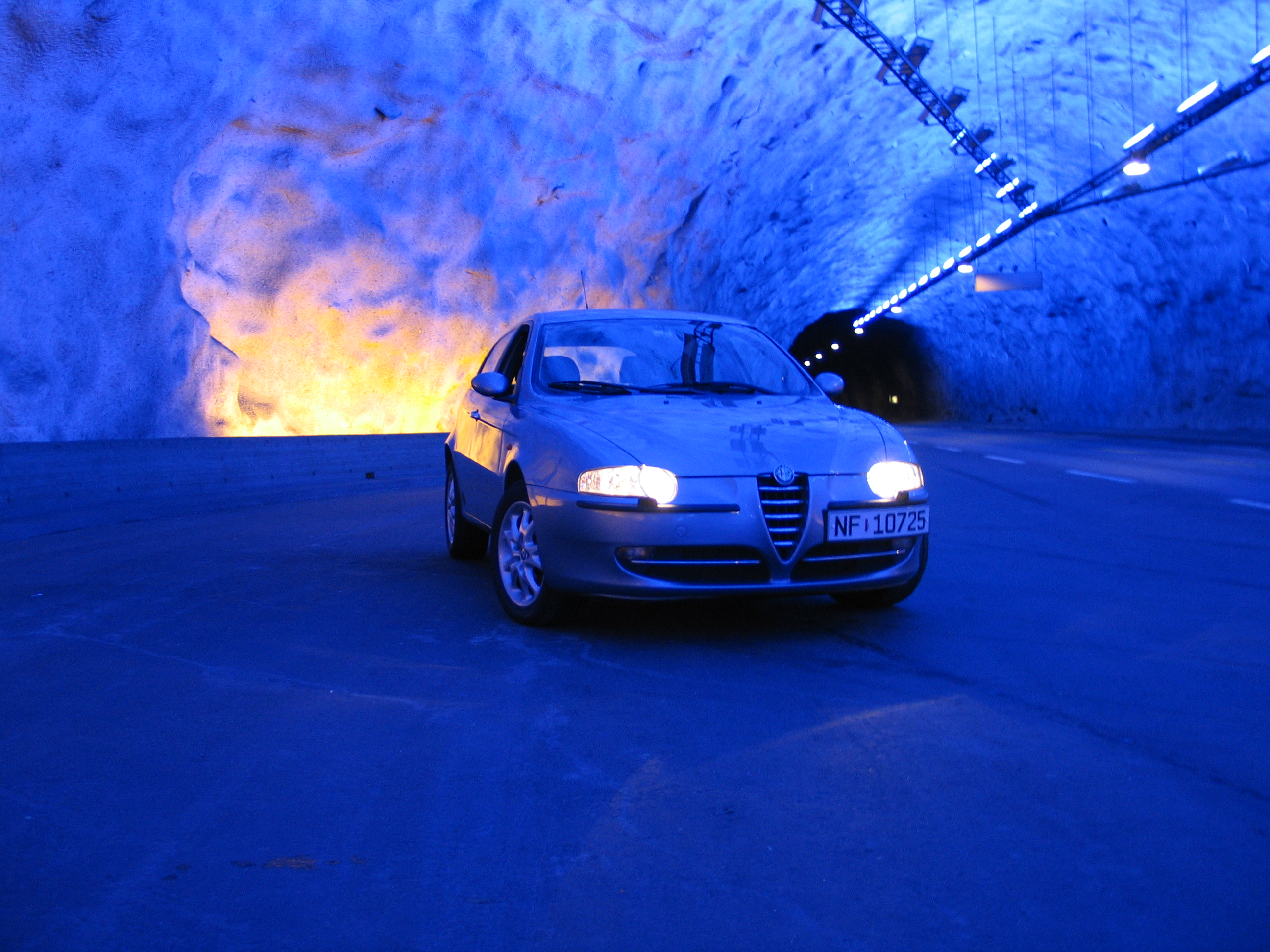
A car parked in one of the tunnel caves

View of one of the caves

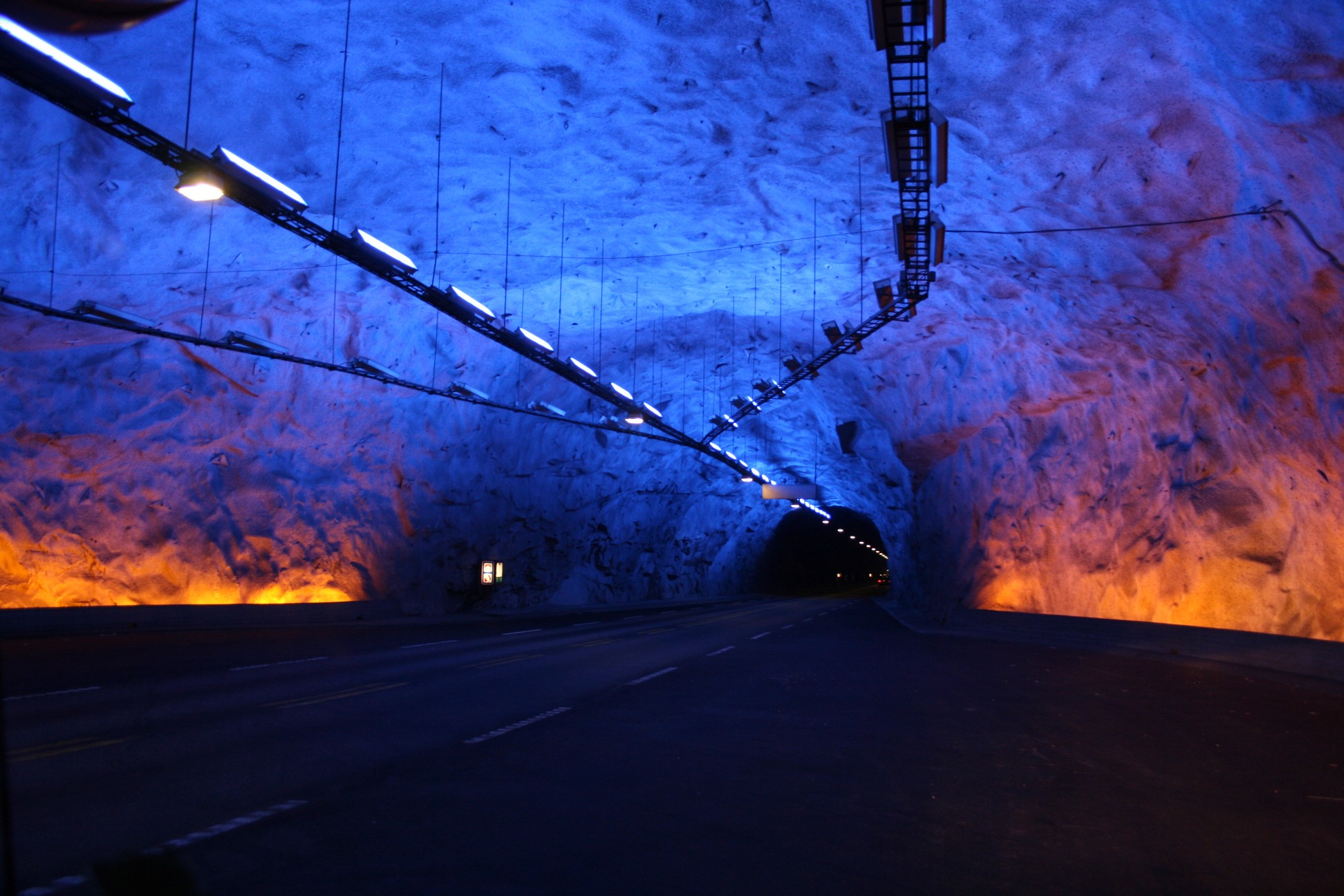
One of the Lærdalstunnel caves has blue and yellow lighting

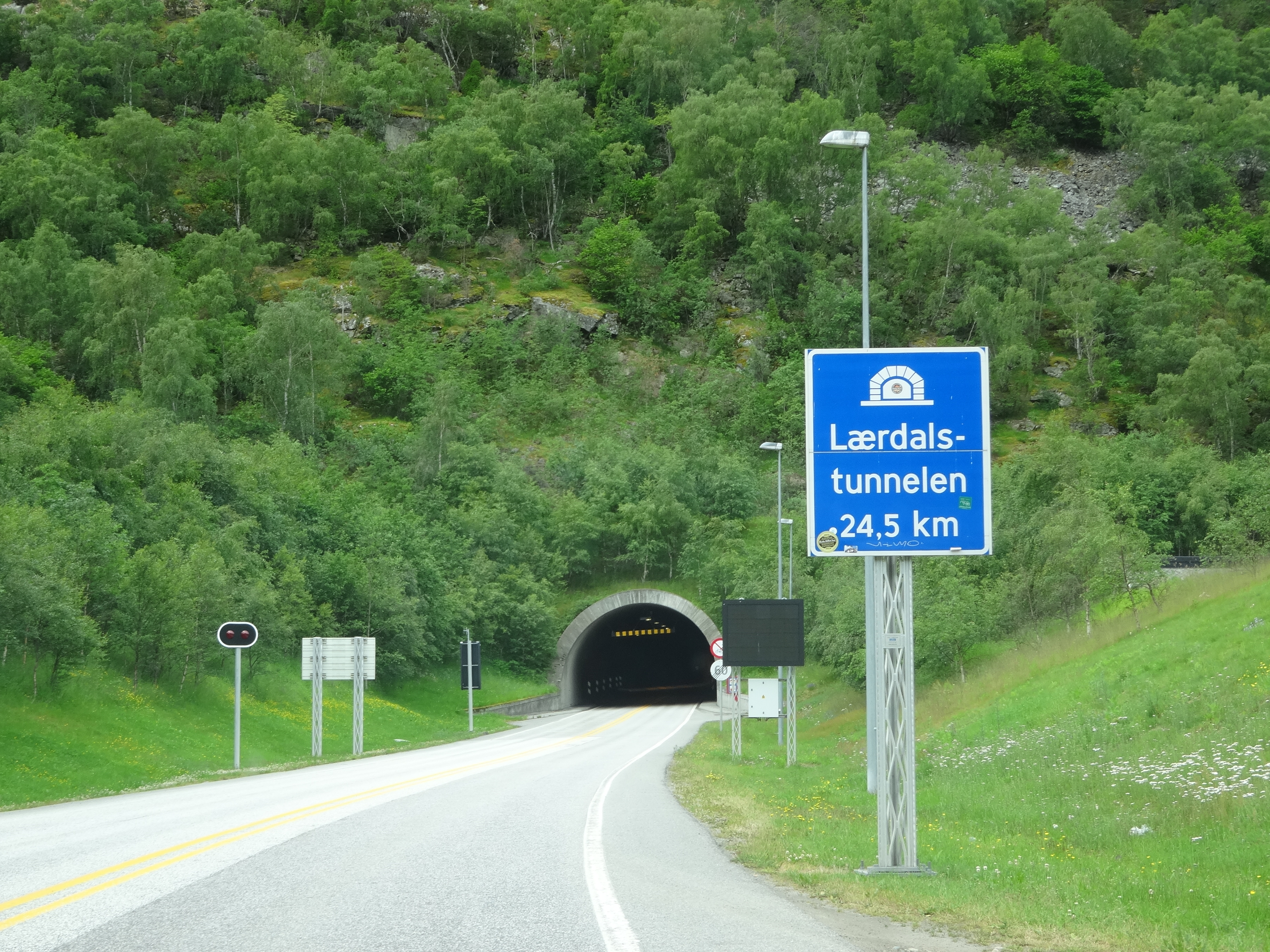
North portal

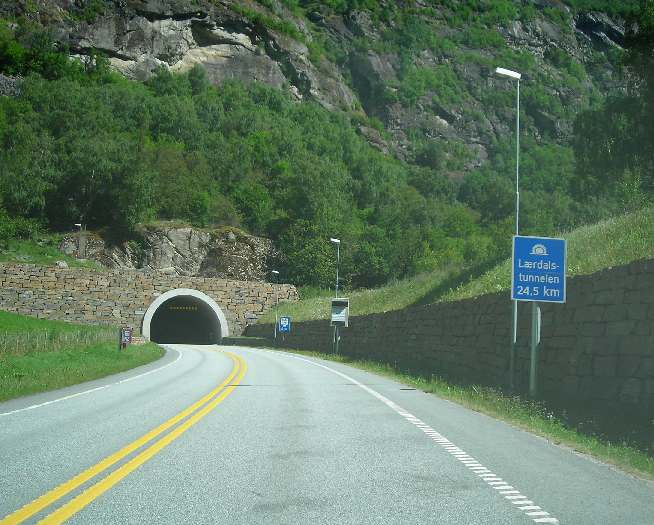
South portal

Records
Preceded by Gotthard Road Tunnel; 16.4 km (10.2 mi)	World's longest road tunnel 2000–present	Incumbent
