= Túnel de Oriente =

Road tunnel in Colombia

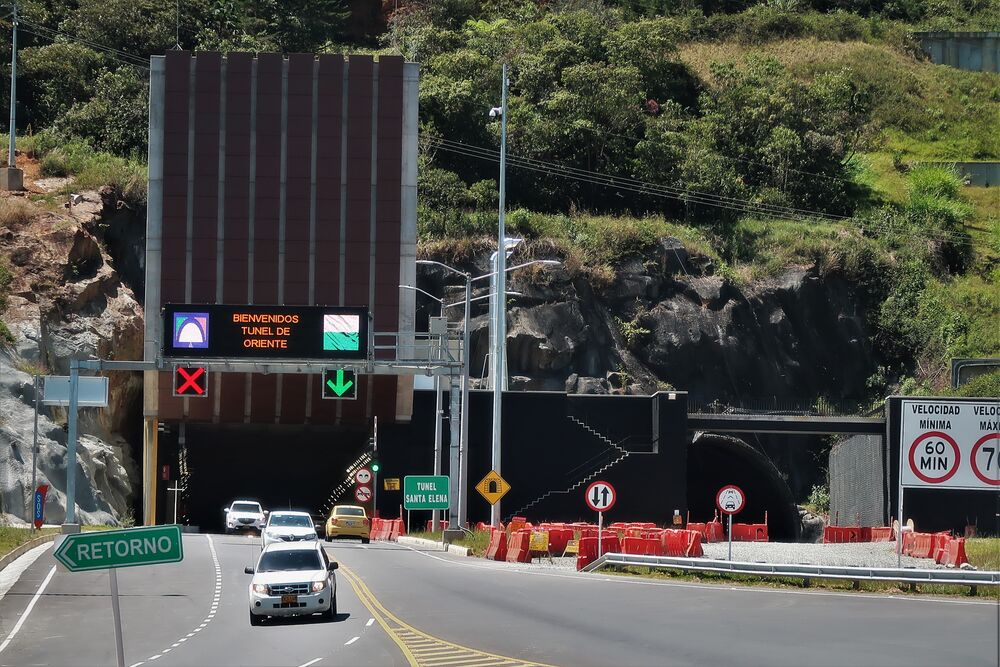
- Eastern portal
- Interactive map of Túnel de Oriente

Overview
- Location: Antioquia Department, Colombia
- Coordinates: 6°12′15″N 75°29′16″W
- Status: In service
- Route: Medellin — Rionegro

Operation
- Work began: 2015
- Opened: 15 August 2019 (initial segment)
- Owner: Concesión Túnel Aburrá-Oriente
- Traffic: automobile
- Character: expressway, twin-tube
- Toll: 23.800 COL$ (cars and vans); 24.100 COL$ (buses and two-axle trucks)

Technical
- Length: 8.2 km (5.1 mi)
- No. of lanes: 2 per tube
- Operating speed: 70 km/h

The Túnel de Oriente is an 8.2-kilometre (5.1 mi) long toll road tunnel in Antioquia Department, Colombia, which connects the Aburrá Valley metropolitan area with the adjacent San Nicolas Valley, notably connecting the city of Medellín with the José María Córdova International Airport in Rionegro. It was opened on August 15, 2019.

== Overview ==
The tunnel is the second longest vehicular tunnel in Latin America, after the Tunel de la Línea, and is expected to be surpassed by the under-construction Toyo Tunnel, both of which are also in Colombia.

The entire project is made up of two tunnels—the main 8.2 km long tunnel and a shorter 774-metre (2,539 ft) long-tunnel—and nine viaducts. The initial phase, opened on August 15, 2019, comprises one two-lane tube carrying traffic in both directions. Its completion was delayed several times due mainly to leaks found during construction. The total cost of the project was 1.1 trillion pesos. A second tube is already under construction, after the completion of which each tube will carry two lanes of traffic in one direction.

The tunnel allows a travel time between José María Córdova International Airport and Medellín's city centre of around 45 minutes, compared to around 1 hour and 30 minutes via other toll-free itineraries around the mountains.
