= G5515 Zhangjiajie–Nanchong Expressway =

Road in China

Zhangjiajie–Nanchong Expressway
- 张家界－南充高速公路
- Zhangnan Expressway 张南高速公路

Route information
- Auxiliary route of G55

Major junctions
- West end: G42 in Gaoping, Nanchong, Sichuan
- East end: G5513 in Yongding, Zhangjiajie, Hunan

Location
- Country: China

Highway system
- National Trunk Highway System; Primary; Auxiliary; National Highways; Transport in China
← G5513	→ G5516

The G5515 Zhangjiajie–Nanchong Expressway (Chinese: 张家界—南充高速公路), also referred to as the Zhangnan Expressway (Chinese: 张南高速公路), is an expressway in China that connects the cities of Zhangjiajie, Hunan and Nanchong, Sichuan.

== Route ==
The expressway begins in Zhangjiajie and passes through Laifeng, Qianjiang, Shizhu, Zhongxian, Liangping, Dazhu and Yingshan before terminating in Nanchong.

The route passes through the provinces of Hubei, Hunan and Sichuan as well as the direct-administered municipality of Chongqing.
