= Ilgaz 15 July Independence Tunnel =

Road tunnel in Turkey

Ilgaz 15 July Independence Tunnel Ilgaz 15 Temmuz İstiklal Tüneli
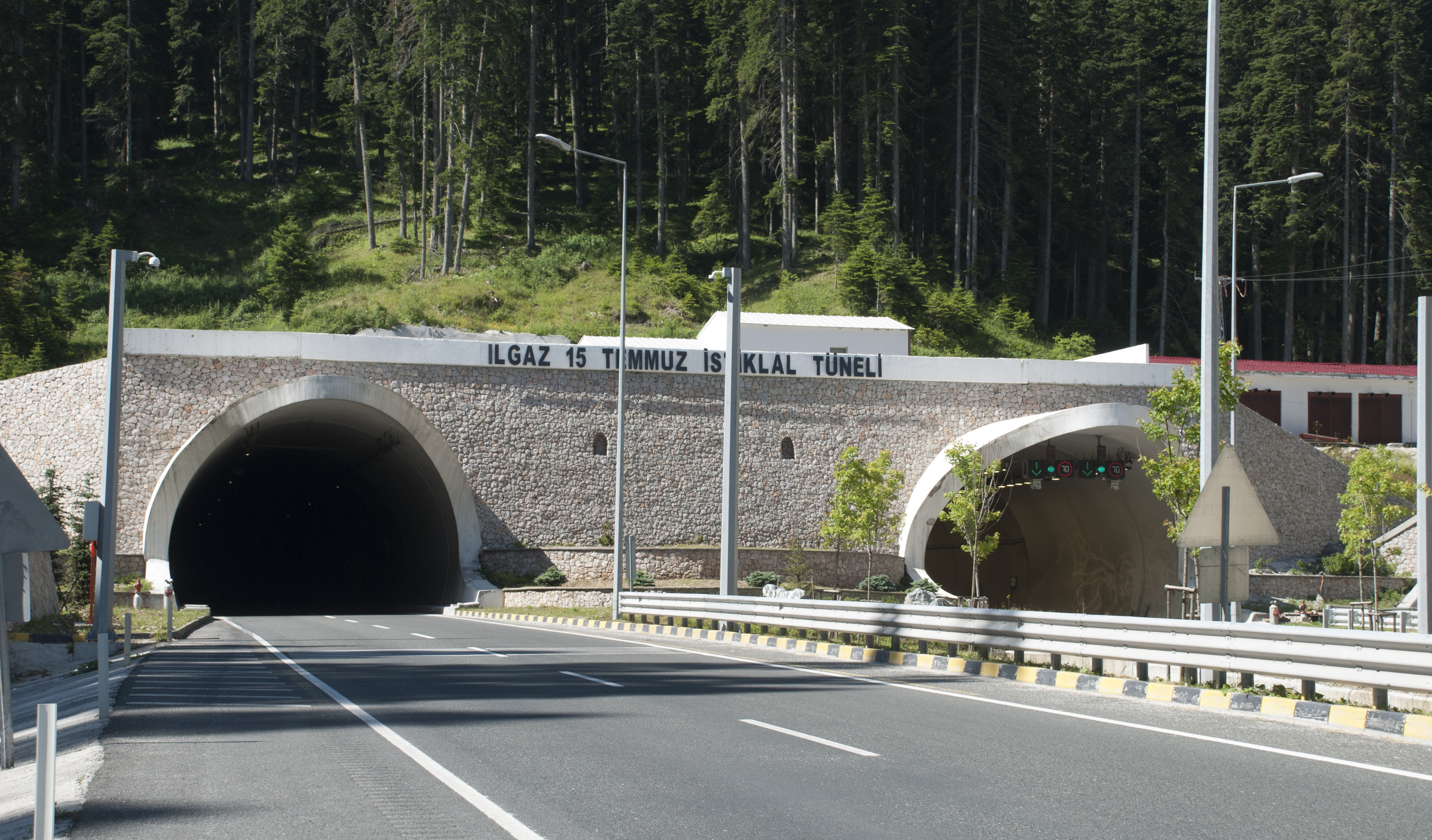
- Interactive map of Ilgaz 15 July Independence Tunnel; Ilgaz 15 Temmuz İstiklal Tüneli

Overview
- Other name: Ilgaz Tunnel
- Location: Kastamonu Province – Çankırı Province
- Coordinates: 41°03′51″N 33°44′15″E Location of Ilgaz Tunnel in Turkey.

- Route: D.765
- Crosses: Ilgaz Mountains

Operation
- Work began: November 9, 2012
- Opened: December 26, 2016
- Owner: General Directorate of Highways
- Traffic: automotive

Technical
- Length: 5,370–5,391 m (17,618–17,687 ft)

Ilgaz 15 July Independence Tunnel, shortly Ilgaz Tunnel, (Turkish: Ilgaz 15 Temmuz İstiklal Tüneli or Ilgaz Tüneli), is a highway tunnel through the Ilgaz Mountains between Kastamonu Province and Çankırı Province in northern Turkey. The tunnel has twin tubes of 5,370 m (17,620 ft) and 5,391 m (17,687 ft) in length. The tunnel was opened to traffic on December 26, 2016.

The construction cost of the tunnel was budgeted to ₺ 572 million (approx. US$200 million as of March 2016). The foundation stone laying ceremony took place on November 9, 2012. Tunnel boring works were completed on April 3, 2016.
