= Kherrata Tunnel =

Road tunnel in Algeria

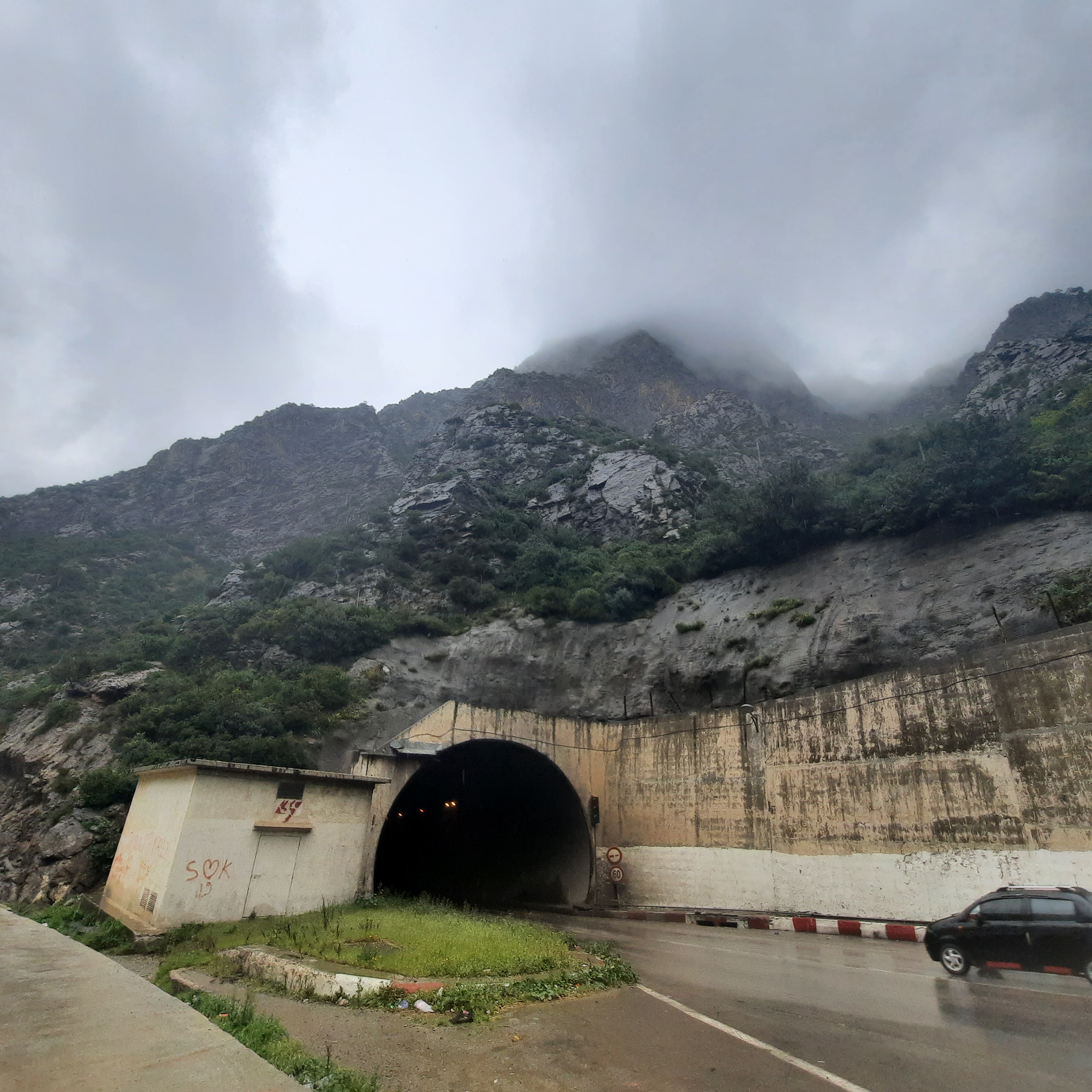
- Interactive map of Kherrata Tunnel

Overview
- Official name: نفق خراطة
- Location: Algeria
- Coordinates: 36.498889°N 5.272222°E

Operation
- Constructed: 1988

Technical
- Operating speed: 80 km/h

Kherrata Tunnel is a road tunnel located in the municipality of Kherrata, pierced under the Babors, connecting the province of Béjaïa to that of Sétif. With a length of 7 km, it is the longest road tunnel in Algeria. The Kherrata tunnel consists of a single gallery for two-way traffic.

== History ==
The Kherrata tunnel was built by an Italian company. The structure was inaugurated in 1988 by the Algerian Minister of Transport. In 2014, modernization works were carried out on the tunnel by a Spanish firm. The program included the replacement of lighting systems, ventilation and smoke extraction, and video surveillance.

On June 17, 2017, a vehicle caught fire inside the tunnel. The fire did not cause any casualties. The tunnel was closed to traffic for several hours, resulting in a complete halt of road traffic on National Road 9. In confined spaces like tunnels, fires pose a high risk due to the difficulties of evacuating suffocating smoke, which is extremely dangerous for users.

== Characteristics ==
The Kherrata tunnel consists of three consecutive tunnels, with a total length of approximately 7 km. It is the longest road tunnel in Africa.

Traffic flows through a single tube with 2 × 1 lanes. The speed is limited to 80 km/h, and a safe distance between each vehicle is now required.

== Usage ==
The daily traffic through the tunnel exceeds 22,000 vehicles, reaching peaks of 30,000, especially during the summer season. Heavy trucks, which account for 45% of the traffic, are not allowed to use the tunnel in the ascending direction.
