= Giraldo, Antioquia =

- Municipality and town
- Flag

- Location of the municipality and town of Giraldo, Antioquia in the Antioquia Department of Colombia

- Location in Colombia
- Coordinates: 6°40′50″N 75°57′10″W
- Country: Colombia
- Department: Antioquia Department
- Subregion: Western

Population (2015)
  - Total: 4,029
- Time zone: UTC-5 (Colombia Standard Time)

Giraldo is a town and municipality in Antioquia Department, Colombia. The population was 4,029 in 2015.
