= Toyo Tunnel =

Road tunnel in Antioquia, Colombia

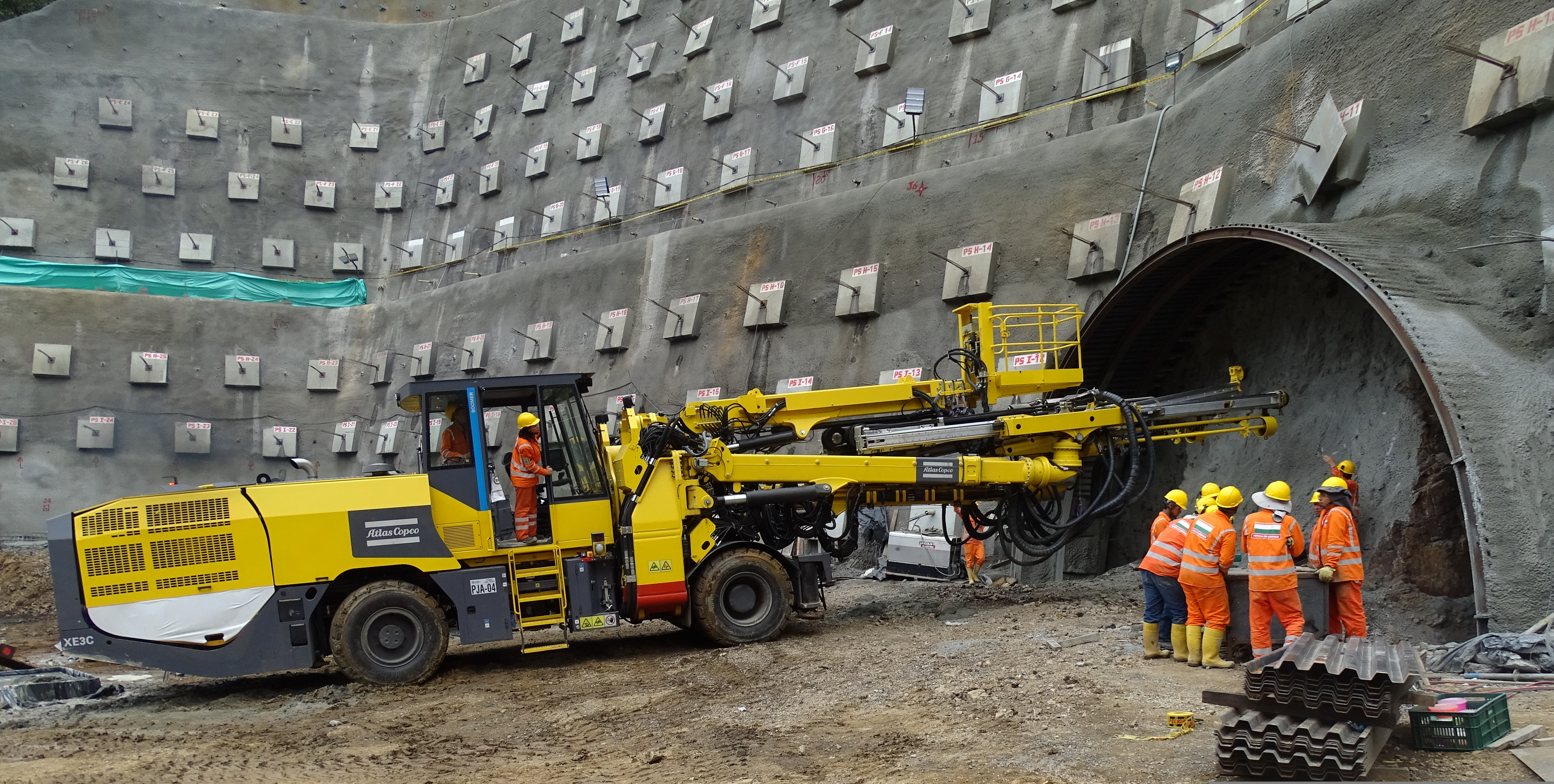
- Interactive map of Toyo Tunnel

Overview
- Official name: Guillermo Gaviria Echeverri Tunnel
- Location: Antioquia, Colombia
- Coordinates: Giraldo entrance: 6°40′34.67″N 75°56′12.1″W; Cañasgordas entrance: 6°43′35.21″N 76°0′32.43″W
- Status: Under construction
- Crosses: Alto del Toyo
- Start: Giraldo
- End: Cañasgordas

Operation
- Opens: October 2027; 11 months' time
- Character: Road

Technical
- Length: 9.73 km (6.0 mi)
- Operating speed: 80 km/h (50 mph)

The Toyo Tunnel (officially the Guillermo Gaviria Echeverri Tunnel) is a road tunnel in Antioquia, Colombia between Giraldo and Cañasgordas that is currently under construction. Excavation of the tunnel began in mid-2018, and was finished in October 2023. Roads to and from the tunnel are being built by the government of Antioquia, and the tunnel is projected to open in October 2027.

The Toyo Tunnel crosses the alto del Toyo, a part of the Cordillera Occidental, the most westerly of the three branches of the Andes mountain range in Colombia. At 9.73 km, it will be the longest road tunnel in the Americas when it opens.

== History ==
The Toyo Tunnel was first proposed in 2002, as part of the Nueva Vía al Mar project. The plans were finalised at the 2007 and 2010 Andean Tunnel Seminars (Spanish: Seminarios Andino de Túneles). The construction plan split the project into two sections, the first being built by the government of Antioquia and including the Toyo Tunnel, and the second being built by Invías, the road construction agency of the Colombian national government. Both sections were originally projected to be complete by 2026.

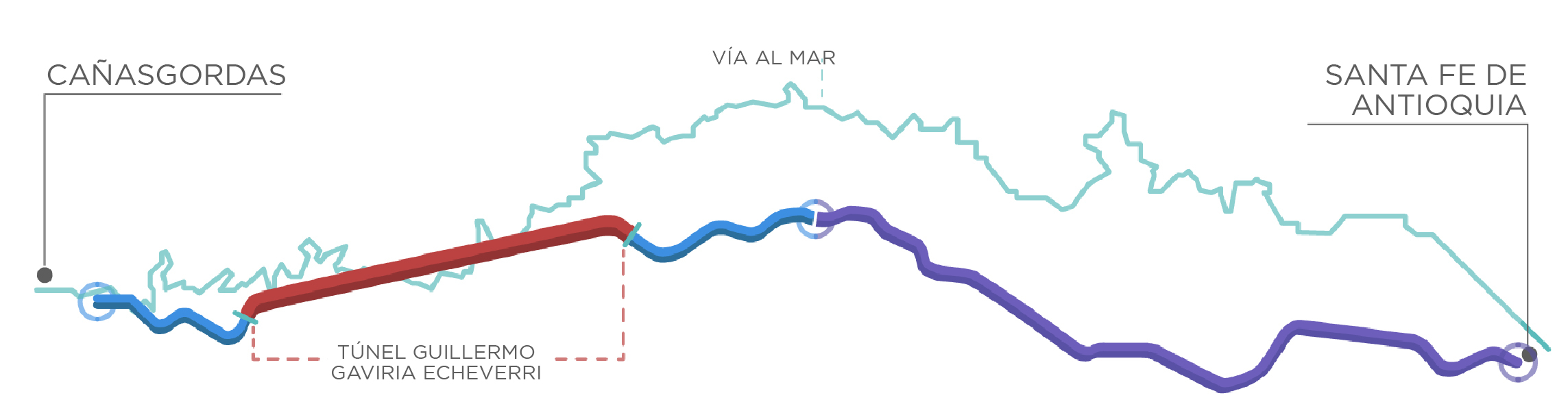
The plans for Nueva Vía al Mar, with section 1 in blue/red and section 2 in purple.

The tunnel is officially named for Colombian engineer Guillermo Gaviria Echeverri, father of Guillermo Gaviria Correa, Aníbal Gaviria, and Sofía Gaviria; he had the idea of a tunnel under the alto del Toyo in 1980.

Excavation of the tunnel began in mid-2018, and was finished on 6 October 2023. In November 2023 Invías reported that section 2 of the project was 45% complete, and that they had only budget enough to work until the following Spring; the government of Gustavo Petro then decided not to allocate more budget to the project. The contract for section 2 was ceded to the government of Antioquia in January 2025, and work restarted on 13 January. At that point, section 1 was reported as 96% complete, and section 2 as 57% complete.

The Toyo Tunnel is projected to open in October 2027.

== Purpose ==
The tunnel will allow travel between Medellín and Urabá in 4 1/2 hours. One claimed benefit of this will be a shorter connection between the Puerto Antioquia and Medellín.
