= G15 Shenyang–Haikou Expressway =

Motorway in eastern China

Shenyang–Haikou Expressway
- 沈阳－海口高速公路
- Shenhai Expressway 沈海高速公路

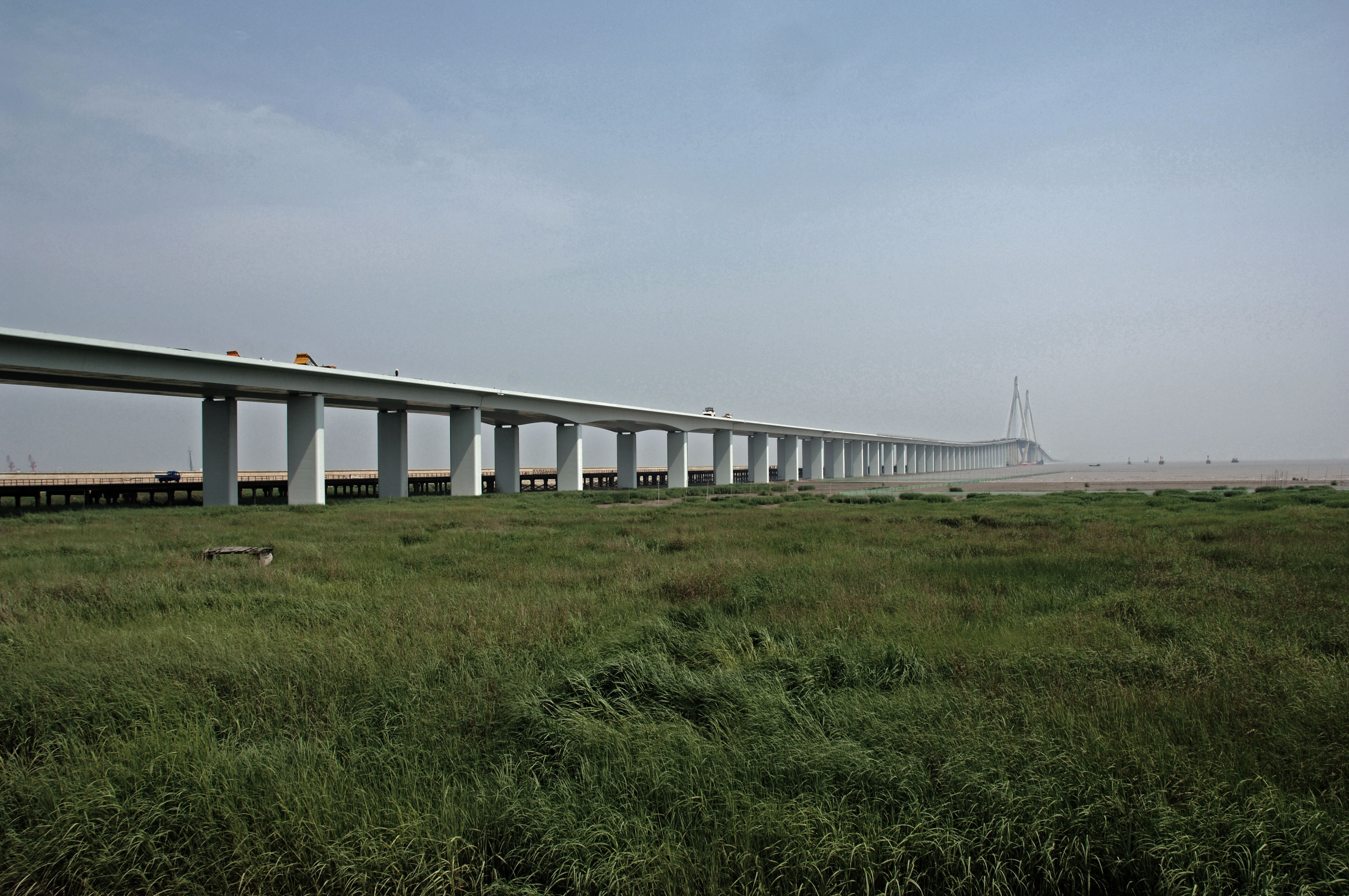
- The Hangzhou Bay Bridge carries 6 lanes of the Shenyang–Haikou Expressway.

Route information
- Part of AH31
- Length: 3,632 km (2,257 mi) Length when complete.

Major junctions
- North end: G1113 / G1501 in Shenyang, Liaoning
- G16 in Anshan, Liaoning; G11 in Dalian, Liaoning; G18 in Yantai, Shandong; G20 in Qingdao, Shandong; G22 in Qingdao, Shandong; G25 in Ganyu County, Lianyungang, Jiangsu; G30 in Lianyungang, Jiangsu; G25 in Guanyun County, Lianyungang, Jiangsu; G40 in Nantong, Jiangsu; G2 / G42 in Shanghai; G50 in Shanghai; G60 / G92 in Shanghai; G3 / G70 in Fuzhou, Fujian; G72 in Quanzhou, Fujian; G76 in Zhangzhou, Fujian; G78 in Shantou, Guangdong; G25 in Shenzhen, Guangdong; G4 in Dongguan, Guangdong; G4 in Guangzhou, Guangdong; G55 in Foshan, Guangdong; G80 in Foshan, Guangdong; G75 in Zhanjiang, Guangdong
- South end: Haikou, Hainan (when complete); G207 in Zhanjiang, Guangdong (current)

Location
- Country: China

Highway system
- National Trunk Highway System; Primary; Auxiliary; National Highways; Transport in China
← G1221	→ G1501

The Shenyang–Haikou Expressway (Chinese: 沈阳—海口高速公路), designated as G15 and commonly referred to as the Shenhai Expressway (沈海高速公路) is an expressway in China that connects the cities of Shenyang, Liaoning, and Haikou, Hainan. It is 3,710 km (2,310 mi) in length. One of its oldest portions is the Shenyang–Dalian Expressway, or Shenda Expressway (沈大高速公路) is a 400 km (250 mi) expressway that connects Shenyang and Dalian, the two largest cities of China's Liaoning province.

The expressway is complete for the majority of its length except for two major water crossings that have yet to be built. A fixed link across the Bohai Sea is required to join the first missing link from Dalian to Yantai. The construction of a tunnel was announced in February 2011. Second, a bridge has to be constructed across the Qiongzhou Strait from Mainland China to Hainan. Currently, the southern terminus is Xuwen County, in the city of Zhanjiang, Guangdong, because the fixed link to Haikou, Hainan has not been built yet.

Once fully complete, the expressway features many other important crossings over bodies of water. The expressway crosses the Yangtze River using the Sutong Bridge, the bridge with the second longest cable-stayed span in the world as of 2012, connecting Nantong and Changshu, a satellite city of Suzhou, in Jiangsu Province. The expressway also uses the Hangzhou Bay Bridge between Jiaxing and Ningbo, one of the longest trans-oceanic bridges in the world.

== Route ==
The expressway passes through the following major cities:

=== Liaoning ===
- Shenyang
- Anshan
- Dalian
- Dalian-Yantai Tunnel is being evaluated, but not constructed. Bohai Train Ferry, which carries freight railway cars, trucks, cars and passengers, is currently used.

=== Shandong ===
- Qingdao
- Yantai
- Rizhao

=== Jiangsu ===
- Lianyungang
- Yancheng
- Nantong
- Suzhou

=== Shanghai ===
In Shanghai, the section of the expressway known as Jiajin Expressway enters the city in Jiading District. It passes to the west of the city centre of Jiading, where a multi-level stack interchange connects it with the northern section of the G1503 Shanghai Ring Expressway, before continuing south into Qingpu District. In Qingpu District, it connects with the concurrent G2 Beijing–Shanghai and G42 Shanghai–Chengdu expressways and then passes to the west of Shanghai Hongqiao Airport and Shanghai Hongqiao Railway Station. An interchange with Songze Elevated Road provides access east to the adjacent airport and railway station. At the boundary between Qingpu District and Songjiang District, the expressway intersects with the G50 Shanghai–Chongqing Expressway.

In Songjiang District, the expressway links to the concurrent G60 Shanghai–Kunming and G92 Hangzhou Bay Ring expressways, followed by the S32 Shanghai–Jiaxing–Huzhou Expressway, the latter which connects to Shanghai Pudong International Airport. It then continues into Jinshan District, where it connects again to the G1501 Shanghai Ring Expressway before making a sharp turn west at the S4 Shanghai–Jinshan Expressway just north of the city centre of Jinshan. As it approaches the Zhejiang border, it connects with the southern terminus of S19 Xinnong–Jinshanwei Expressway, a short north–south expressway in Jinshan.

=== Zhejiang ===
- Ningbo
- Taizhou
- Wenzhou

=== Fujian ===
- Ningde
- Fuzhou
- Putian
- Quanzhou
- Xiamen
- Zhangzhou

=== Guangdong ===
- Shantou
- Shenzhen
- Guangzhou
- Yangjiang
- Maoming
- Zhanjiang
- Bridge from Mainland China to Hainan not constructed, no continuation of expressway here, ferry connection available

=== Hainan ===
- Haikou (currently only the section within Hainan Island is completed on 28 December 2022, this section is paralleled with G75)

== Detailed Itinerary ==
From North to South
0	G1501 Shenyang Ring Expressway
Shenyang Metropolitan Area
4	Xuesong Rd. Sujiatun
5	4th Shenyang Ring Road; Towards S101 Road; Sujiatun-Linshengpu
20	G202 Road; S107 Road; Shilihe-Honglingpu
30	G202 Road; S304 Road; Dengta
	S20 Dengliao Expressway
Jingquan Service Area
Liaoyang Urban Area
47	Zhenxing Rd. Liaoyang-Centre
52	S106 Road; Towards G202 Road; Liaoyang-Centre; Shaling
Liaoyang Urban Area
59 A-B	G91 Liaozhong Ring Expressway
65	Lantang Line; Towards G202 Road; Shoushan
Anshan Urban Area
76	Qianshan W Rd. Tonghai Ave. Anshan-Centre Towards Qianshan National Park
	S22 Antai Expressway
Anshan Urban Area
88	S101 Road; S307 Road; Anshan-South; Teng'ao-Mujia
Ganquan Service Area
104	Tonghai Ave. Towards G202 Road; Nantai
112	S312 Road; Towards G202 Road; Haicheng
117	S322 Road; Xiliu-Haicheng
	G16 Danxi Expressway
134	Huzhuang
	S21 Fuying Expressway (To be renamed G4513 Naiying Expressway)
Yingkou Urban Area
147	S311 Road Yingkou East Railway Station Yingkou-Centre; Dashiqiao
169	G305 Road; Yingkou-Centre; Gaizhou
Yingkou Urban Area
Xihai Service Area
177	X810 Road Gaizhou West Railway Station
	S19 Zhaunggai Expressway
184	G202 Road; Shagang
Bayuquan Urban Area
195	Jingang Rd. Qinglongshan St. Bayuquan-Centre
204	Shanhai Ave. Xioungyue Service Area Bayuquan-Centre; Xiongyue
Bayuquan Urban Area
225	G202 Road; Liguan
241	Zhaotun-Yongning
Fuzhouhe Service Area
262	Taiyang
271	S313 Road; Wafangdian
282	Wajiao Line; Towards G202 Road; Wafangdian
292	G202 Road; Paotai
	S12 Pichang Expressway
303	Pulandian-North
309	G202 Road Puwan Railway Station; Jinpu line(line 13) Shihe High Speed Rail Station Shihe; Pulandian-South
316	G202 Road; Sanshilipu
Sanshilipu Service Area
322	S23 Dayaowan Port Expressway
Jiuli Service Area
338	G201 Road; G202 Road Dalian Development Area Jinpu line (line 13) Jinzhou Station Jinzhou
Dalian Metropolitan Area
341 A-B (1467 A-B)	G11 Heda Expressway
347	Dalian-North
350	Xibei Rd. Dalian Zhoushuizi International Airport; Dalian-Gezhenpu
364	G202 Road; Dalian-Yingchengzi
Dalian Metropolitan Area
375	G202 Road; Changcheng-Longtou
384	G202 Road; Lüshunkou-Centre; Sanjianpu
390	Xinlong Rd. Shuangdaowan Rd. Lüshunkou-Centre; Shuangdaowan
Lüshunkou Toll Station
396	Guangyuan St. Jiangxi Rd. Lüshunkou-Port
Liaoning Province
Gap; Bohai Train Ferry connecting Dalian and Yantai available Bohai Strait tunnel planned
Shandong Province
Yantai Metropolitan Area
Tongsan Ferry Terminal
400	Huanhai Rd. Yantai Port Yantai-Zhifu
407	Xingfu S. Rd. Yantai-Zhifu Yantai Development Zone
410	S264 Road; Yantai-Zhifu
413 A-B	Hengshan Rd. Fuhai Rd. Yantai Development Zone Yantai-Fushan
415 A-B	G206 Road; S264 Road; S302 Road; Yantai-Fushan
Fushan Toll Station
420 A-B	G18 Rongwu Expressway
Fushan Service Area
Yantai Metropolitan Area
430	S802 Road; Yantai-West
437	S802 Road; Zangjiazhuang
	S17 Pengqi Expressway
449	S209 Road; S211 Road; S802 Road; Songshan; Qixia-North
465	S304 Road; Qixia-Centre
Qixia Service Area
481	S306 Road; Biguo-Guandao-Guanli-Yangchu; Qixia-South
489	Towards S213 Road; Tangezhuang
503	S307 Road; Towards S213 Road; Laiyang-Hetoudian
	S19 Longqing Expressway
	S16 Rongwei Expressway
527	S393 Road; Laixi-Centre
Laixi Service Area
538	S602 Road; Yuanshang
559	S217 Road; S603 Road; Renzhao-Yifengdian
565	G2011 Qingxin Expressway
569	S218 Road; Towards S217 Road; Nancun
	G20 Qingyin Expressway; G308 Road; Towards Qingdao
Jiaozhou Service Area
607	S217 Road; S325 Road; Jiaozhou
617	Towards S397 Road; G204 Road; Jiulong; Jiaozhou-South
626	S328 Road; Wangtai
	G22 Qinglan Expressway
	S7602 Qingdao Qianwan Harbour Area 2st Port Expressway
649	S329 Road; Huangdao-Tieshan
Jiaonan Service Area
677	S334 Road; Towards G204 Road; Poli
688	S398 Road; Dachang
Rizhao Urban Area
	S23 Weiri Expressway
713	G204 Road; Shanhai Rd. Rizhao-North
722 A-B	G1511 Rilan Expressway; Rizhao-Centre
	S7801 Rizhao Shijiu Harbour Area Port Expressway
Rizhao Service Area
737	S341 Road; Taoluo
Rizhao Urban Area
756	S342 Road; Lanshan-Andongwei
Shandong Province; Jiangsu Province
Jiangsu - Shandong Provincial Boundary Toll Station
	G204 Road; G228 Road (Newly assigned); Zhewang
780	Towards G204 Road; Haitou
Ganma Service Area
797	Qinghuan Line; Towards G204 Road; Ganyu
	G25 Changshen Expressway
811	Old G310 Road; G327 Road; Luoyang-Dunshang
Lianyungang Urban Area
814	G204 Road; G310 Road; G327 Road; Lianyungang-North
Punan Service Area
821	S323 Road; Lianyungang-Centre
	G30 Lianhuo Expressway
835	Xinba Middle Line; Lianyungang-South; Xinba-Jinping
Lianyungang Urban Area
	G25 Changshen Expressway
851	G204 Road; Xiaoyi; Guanyun-North
Guanyun Service Area
873	S242 Road; S324 Road; Tuhe-Yangji; Guanyun-West
885	S345 Road; Changmao-Tianlou; Xiangshui-North
894	S326 Road; Xiangshui-South
Xiangshui Service Area
908	X205 Road; X304 Road; Towards G204 Road; Liutao-Yunhe
921	S327 Road; Binhai
930	S328 Road; Binhai-Caiqiao-Tongyu
Binhai Service Area
959	S329 Road; Funing-Sheyang
973	S233 Road; Shanggang-Xingqiao
Sheyang Service Area
	S29 Yangjing Expressway
Yancheng Urban Area
996	S331 Road; Yancheng-Centre
1006	South Ring Rd. Yancheng-South
	S18 Yanhuai Expressway
Yancheng Urban Area
1029	Nanxiang W. Rd. Towards S332 Road; Dafeng
Dafeng Service Area
1050	Shaungcao Line; Towards G204 Road; Baiju-Caoyan-Xiaohai
1063	S333 Road; Dongtai
1075	S352 Road; Anfeng-Liangduo-Nanshenzao
Dongtai Service Area
1088	Anfeng-Fu'an
	Dadong -Lipu
1104	S221 Road; Towards G328 Road; Hai'an
	S28 Qiyang Expressway
1120	X302 Road; Rugao-Dongchen
1127	S334 Road; Rugao-Dingyan
Rugao Service Area
1143	X303 Road; Baipu
1154	X016 Road; X024 Road; Liuqiao
1164	G40 Hushan Expressway; Tongjing Ave. Nantong-North
Concurrent with G40 Hushan Expressway
	S19 Tongwu Expressway
Nantong Metropolitan Area
1172	S335 Road; Nantong Xingdong Airport; Nantong-Centre; Tongzhou
Xianfeng Service Area
	Shiji Ave. Nantong-Centre
Concurrent with G40 Hushan Expressway
1183	G40 Hushan Expressway; Tonghu Ave. Nantong-East
1189	S336 Road; Nantong-South; Haimen
Sutong Bridge Service Area
Sutong Bridge North Toll Station
1196	S223 Road Nantong Development Zone
Nantong Metropolitan Area
Sutong Yangtze River Bridge
1209	S338 Road Changshu Development Zone Changshu-Bixi
Sutong Bridge South Toll Station
1218	G15W Changtai Expressway; S38 Changhe Expressway (To be renamed G42S Huwu Expressway
Taicang Shaxi Service Area
1232	S80 Taicang North Port Expressway Taicang Port Development Zone
1234	S224 Road; Shaxi
1243	S48 Huyi Expressway
Taicang Main Line Toll Station
1247	S339 Road; Taicang-Liuhe
1248	Taicang
Jiangsu Province; Shanghai City
Shanghai Metropolitan Area
1258	S321 Road; Zhuqiao Zhuqiao Service Area
Zhuqiao Toll Station
	Shisheng Rd. Towards G204 Road; Jiading-Jiaxi
1263	G204 Road; Jiading-Jiaxi
1266	G1501 Shanghai Ring Expressway
1270 A-B	S6 Huxiang Expressway; S322 Road Shanghai International Circuit 11 Malu Station
1276	G312 Road Shanghai Auto Museum; Tongji University (Jiading Campus)
1278	G2 Jinghu Expressway; G42 Hurong Expressway
Shanghai Metropolitan Area
1281 A-B	S26 Huchang Expressway; Huaxu Highway; Huaxin
1285 A	Beiqing Highway
1285 B	Songze Elevated Road; Shanghai Hongqiao International Airport TowardsShanghai Hongqiao Railway Station; 17 panlong Road Station; Towards 2 17 Hongqiao Railway Station
1290	G50 Huyu Expressway
1293	Husong Highway 9 Jiuting Station
1297	Xinzhuan Highway
1301	G60 Hukun Expressway; G92 Hangzhou Bay Ring Expressway; Minyi Rd. Xinqiao
1309 A-B-C	S32 Shenjiahu Expressway; Cheting Highway
Yexie Service Area
1314	Yexin Highway
1322	G1503 Shanghai Ring Expressway
1327	Tingwei Highway; Jinshan Industrial Zone Highway Jinshan Industrial Zone
1331-1332	S4 Hujin Expressway; Tingwei Highway; Jinshan-East
1336	Hangzhouwen Highway; Jinshan-New Town
1342	S19 Xinwei Expressway; Jinshan-Jinshanwei
Jinshan Service Area
Jinshan Toll Station
Shanghai City; Zhejiang Province
1351	Xincang Connecting Line; Xincang
Pinghu Service Area
1358	X106 Road; Huanggu
1369	S202 Road; Pinghu-Zhapu Mo's Manor
1374	G92 Hangzhou Bay Ring Expressway; S7 Hangzhouwan Bay Bridge North Connector; S11 Zhajiasu Expressway (To be renamed G15W2 Changjia Expressway)
Concurrent with G92 Hangzhou Bay Ring Expressway
1377	S101 Road; Haiyan-Zhapu Port of Jiaxing
Bei'an Service Area
Hangzhou Bay Bridge: Offshore Platform
Nan'an Service Area
Hangzhou Bay Bridge Toll Station
1416	Binhai 1st Rd. S17 Hangshaoning Expressway (To be renamed G92N Hangshao Expressway)
1430	X119 Road; Cixi-Shengshan-Xinpu
1446	G329 Road Second Line; Fuhai-Guanhaiwei
1451	G329 Road; Guanhaiwei-Longshan-Zhangqi
Ningbo Urban Area
Cicheng Service Area
1466	S319 Road; Cicheng-Sanqishi; Ningbo-North
(1)	G1501 Ningbo Ring Expressway; G9211 Yongzhou Expressway; Jiangbei Connecting Line; Ningbo-Jiangbei
Concurrent with G1501 Ningbo Ring Expressway; Concurrent with G92 Hangzhou Bay Ring Expressway
Ningbo Urban Area
(80 A-B)	G92 Hangzhou Bay Ring Expressway; S5 Hangzhou–Ningbo Expressway
(74)	Yinxian Ave. Hengjie-Jishigang; Ningbo-West
(68 A-B)	G1512 Yongjin Expressway; Yongjin Connecting Line; Ningbo Lishe International Airport
(64)	Airport Rd. S. Jiangshan-North; Ningbo-South
Concurrent with G1501 Ningbo Ring Expressway
(55)	G1501 Ningbo Ring Expressway; S1 Yongtaiwen Expressway
1507	Huanzhen S. Rd. Tiantong S. Rd. Jiangmao Rd. Jiangshan
1519	X319 Road; Towards S214 Road; Fenghua
Fenghua Service Area
1537	S214 Road; Xidian
Ninghai Service Area
1554	S214 Road; S311 Road; Ninghai
1579	X414 Road; S214 Road; Chalu
1593	S214 Road; S224 Road; Sanmen
	G15W Changtai Expressway
1616	S214 Road; S225 Road; Linhai-North
Taizhou Service Area
1632	G104 Road; Linhai-South
	S28 Taijin Expressway
1644	G104 Road; S325 Road; Taizhou-Centre; Huangyan
1657	Xinghua Rd. Luqiao-Yuanqiao
1666	G104 Road; Dashi 1st Class Highway; Daxi-Wenling
1685	G104 Road; Dashi 1st Class Highway; Yandang Yandangshan Railway Station
Qingjiang Service Area
1707	Hongnan Ave. Hongqiao
1720	G104 Road; Ningkang W. Rd. Yandang
	S10 Wenzhou Ring Expressway
1739	G104 Road; Beibaixiang-Liushi-Wuniu; Wenzhao-North
Wenzhou Urban Area
1743	Qidu Island
1747	Airport Rd. S332 Road; Wenzhou-East; Longwan-Dongtou; Wenzhou Longwan International Airport
1755	G1513 Wenli Expressway
Wenzhou Urban Area
1764	G104 Road; Tangxia; Rui'an-North
1771	Ruifeng Ave. Rui'an-Centre
1775	Ruigao Line; S330 Road; Feiyun Rui'an Railway Station
	S10 Wenzhou Ring Expressway
1787	G104 Road; Pingyang
1803	G104 Road; Xiaolong Line; Xiaojiang-Longgang
1807	G104 Road Cangnan Railway Station Cangnan
Cangnan Service Area
1818	G104 Road; S232 Road; Guanmei-Qiaodun
Zhemin Toll Station
1830	G104 Road; S331 Road; Yuehu
Zhejiang Province; Fujian Province
Shenhai Minzhe Toll Station
	G15W3 Yongguan Expressway
1859	G104 Road; Fuding
Fuding Service Area
1866	X974 Road; Bailin-Diantou-Dianxia
1883	X973 Road Taimushan Railway Station Taimushan
	X973 Road; Xiamen
1898	X973 Road; Yacheng
Huyudao Service Area
1910	X981 Road; Sansha; Shuimen Air Base
1922	Chiya Ave. Xiapu Railway Station Xiapu
1937	S301 Road; Yantian
Fu'an Service Area
1953	G1514 Ningshang Expressway Fu'an Railway Station Wanwu
1959	S302 Road; Xiabaishi
Yundan Service Area
1974	S201 Road; Zhangwan; Ningde-North
	G15W3 Yongguan Expressway
1985	Wan'an W. Rd. Towards G104 Road; Ningbo-South
1994	G15W3 Yongguan Expressway; S201 Road; Towards G104 Road; Feiluan
2004	Luochuan Middle Rd. Towards G104 Road; Luoyan-Centre
2012	G104 Road; Luoyan-South
2026	G104 Road; Danyang
2034	G1501 Fuzhou Ring Expressway
2041	S201 Road; Towards G104 Road; Lianjiang
2053	G104 Road; S201 Road; Guntou
Fuzhou Metropolitan Area
2069	S1531 Fuzhou Airport Expressway; G104 Road; Fujian-Mawei
Concurrent with S1531 Fuzhou Airport Expressway
Qingzhou Bridge
Fuzhou Metropolitan Area
Concurrent with S1531 Fuzhou Airport Expressway
	S1531 Fuzhou Airport Expressway; Fuzhou Changle International Airport
	S203 Road; Changle
	S1521 Fuzhou Connecting Line; Fuzhou-Cangshan
2086	G324 Road; S203 Road; Qingkou-Shanggan-Xiangqian
	G3 Jingtai Expressway; G70 Fuyin Expressway; G1501 Fuzhou Ring Expressway-North; G15W3 Yongguan Expressway-North G1501 Fuzhou Ring Expressway-South; G15W3 Yongguan Expressway-South
Qingkou Service Area
	S7021 Fuzhou South Connecting Line
2112	G324 Road; Fuqing
Dawang Service Area
2130	S0326 Pingtan Connecting Line; G324 Road; Yuxi
	G1517 Puyan Expressway
Concurrent with G1517 Puyan Expressway
Chigang Service Area
2149	G324 Road; Hanjiang
Concurrent with G1517 Puyan Expressway
	G1517 Puyan Expressway
2161	S201 Road; S202 Road; Putian-Huangshi
	S10 Puyong Expressway
Dongjin Service Area
2186	S306 Road; Xangang Ave. Towards G324 Road Fengting Railway Station Fengting
2195	Tonggang Rd. G324 Road; Tuling-Quangang
Yiban Service Area
2205	G324 Road; Hui'an-North
2222	X308 Road; Huangtang; Hui'an-Centre
	G1502 Quanzhou Ring Expressway
Luoyangjiang Service Area
Quanzhou Urban Area
2231	G324 Road; Chengdong St. Luojiang; Quanzhou-East
Quanzhou Urban Area
2243	Airport Connecting Line; Towards G324 Road; Quanzhou-Centre; Chidian-Jinjiang
2251	G72 Quannan Expressway; S308 Road; Quanzhou-South; Jinjiang
2256	G1502 Quanzhou Ring Expressway
Puli Service Area
2265	G324 Road; Shuitou
2267	G1502 Quanzhou Ring Expressway
2287	G324 Road; Xing'an Ave. Xiang'an-Maxiang; Xiamen-Centre Via
Longjiue Service Area
2296	S206 Road; Tong'an
Xiamen Metropolitan Area
2304	S30 Xiasha Expressway (To be renamed G2517 Shaxia Expressway); Fushazhang Highway Xiamen North Railway Station Xiamen North Railway Station Xiamen-Centre-Jimei
2313	G319 Road; Xiamen-Xinglin
Dongfu Service Area
2323	G76 Xiarong Expressway; G1503 Xiamen Ring Expressway
Xiamen Metropolitan Area
	G15E Zhangzhou Extension
	S1524 Zhangzhou North Connecting Line; Zhangzhou
2334	S208 Road; Longhai
	G15E Zhangzhou Extension
	S208 Road; Dongyuan-Fugong
	S1525 Zhangzhou South Connecting Line; S1591 Zhaoyin Port Expressway
Baishui Service Area
2378	X524 Road; Towards S201 Road; Fotan Zhaojiabao
Tianfu Service Area
2397	S201 Road; X561 Road; Zhangpu
2410	S201 Road; X511 Road; Duxun
Shaxi Service Area
2437	S201 Road; Dongxia-Yunxiao
2444	G324 Road; S201 Road Yunxiao Railway Station Yunxiao
Changshan Service Area
	S1526 Dongshan Connecting Line
2459	S309 Road; Dongshan
2471	G324 Road; S309 Road; Zhao'an-East
Xinan Service Area
2485	G324 Road; Zhao'an-West
Minyue Toll Station
Fujian Province; Guangdong Province
2500	S222 Road; Raoping
2508	X016 Road; Towards G324 Road Raoping Railway Station Qiandong
2527	S335 Road; Chaozhou
Chaozhou Service Area
2535	S231 Road; Longdu
2543	Changhai Rd. Chenghai
Shantou Urban Area
	G78 Shankun Expressway
2549	G324 Road; Shantou-Waisha
2558	Zhongshan E. Rd. Shantou-Centre
Haiwan Toll Station
Shantou Urban Area
Shantou Bay Bridge
2564	Nanbin Rd. Gezhou-Antou
2569	S337 Road; Haojiang
2581	S254 Road; S337 Road; Chaoyang-Haimen
2597	S337 Road; Chengtian; Towards Chaonan
2603	S337 Road; Xian'an
	S13 Jiehui Expressway
2629	S236 Road; Huilai
Huilai Service Area
2644	S337 Road; Longjiang-Xixi
2663	S17 Chaohui Expressway
2677	X139 Road; Towards G324 Road Niehu Service Area Neihu
2696	S240 Road; Lufeng
Shantou Urban Area
2732	S242 Road; Hongcao-Haifeng; Shanwei-Centre
2740	X125 Road; X142 Road; Shanwei-West
Shantou Urban Area
2756	G324 Road Houmen Railway Station Houmen
Houmen Service Area
Baiyunzai Service Area
2777	G324 Road; Ebu-Jilong
	S30 Huishen Coastal Expressway
2798	G324 Road Huidong Railway Station Towards Huidong-Renshan
Huidong Service Area
2808	S21 Guanghui Expressway
2820	S356 Road; Shatian
Shatian Service Area
	S23 Huiao Expressway; S356 Road; Huiyang-East
2833	S254 Road; Huiyang-Centre
Shenzhen Metropolitan Area
2845	Lvzi Ave. G2501 Shenzhen Ring Expressway Pingshan-Kengzi, Pingshan District
	G25 Changshen Expressway
Concurrent with G25 Changshen Expressway
2853	S359 Road; Longgang-Pingshan
2863	G205 Road Universiade Station Longgang-Henggang
He'ao Toll Station
2864	S28 Shuiguan Expressway; Longxiang Ave. Yanlong Ave. Longgang-Pingdi
Concurrent with G25 Changshen Expressway
2868 A-B	G25 Changshen Expressway; S27 Renshen Expressway
2871	S255 Road; Longgang-Pinghu
2873	Pingji Ave. Longgang-Pinghu
2877	S209 Qingping Expressway
2881	G94 Pearl River Delta Ring Expressway
2883	Guanlan Ave. Longhua-North, Guanlan
2890	S31 Longda Expressway; S359 Road; Longhua-Centre, Dalang
2891	Towards S359 Road; Bao'an-Shiyan
2896	S359 Road; Bao'an-Shiyan
2898	S33 Nanguan Expressway
(2252 A-B)	G4 Jinggang'ao; G107 Road; Shenzhen Bao'an International Airport-Terminal
Concurrent with G4 Jinggang'ao
(2250)	G107 Road; Shenzhen Bao'an International Airport-Air Cargo Area Airport East Station Bao'an
(2240)	G107 Road; Songgang Ave; Shenzhen Outer Ring Road; Shenzhen E Ring Road; Bao'an
(2230)	S358 Road; Wushanhuan E Road; Hengzeng Road; Jinxiu Road; Chang'an
	G9411 Dongfo Expressway
Concurrent with G9411 Dongfo Expressway
Shenzhen Metropolitan Area
Dongguan Metropolitan Area
Concurrent with G9411 Dongfo Expressway
(2221)	G9411 Dongfo Expressway; S358 Road; Baida Ave; Qilin W Ave; Beizha, Humen
	S304 Humen Port Branch Line; S358 Road; Humen
	Bolan Ave; Zhanbei Road TowardsHumen Railway Station; Line 2 Humen Railway Station Humen
(2208)	X235 Road; Houjie Line 2 Liaoxia Station
Houjie Service Area
(2203)	S256 Road; Towards Dongguan-Centre; Hongtu Road; Dongguan Ave; Dongguan Outer Ring Road Line 2 Chenwu Station
(2198)	Daojiao; Wejiang Road; Towards Dongguan-Centre-Wanjiang District; Western Main Road; Zhenxing Road
	S119 Road; Wangniudun; N Dongguan Ring Road; Towards Dongguan-Centre-Wanjiang District
	S120 Road; Machong
Dongguan Metropolitan Area
	G107 Road; Xintang, Zengcheng; Towards Dongqu, Huangpu
Guangzhou Metropolitan Area
	S117 Road; Huangpu Subdistrict, Huangpu
(2171) (40)	G4W Guang'ao Expressway; G1501 Guangzhou Ring Expressway; S15 Shenhai Expressway Guangzhou Branch
Concurrent with G1501 Guangzhou Ring Expressway
(1958) (36)	G35 Jiguang Expressway
(33)	G324 Road Changping Station Guangzhou-Huangpu
(27)	S2 Guanghe Expressway
Concurrent with G4 Jinggang'ao
(2150) (18)	G4 Jinggang'ao; S303 Huanan Expressway
(13)	G105 Road; Baiyun-Taihe; Towards Conghua
(11)	G106 Road Longgui Station Baiyun-Renhe
(9)	G45 Daguang Expressway; S41 Guangzhou Airport Expressway; Guangzhou Baiyun International Airport; S267 Road; Baiyun-Renhe
(5)	S114 Road; Baiyun-Jianggao; Huadu
(1)	S110 Guangqing Expressway (To be renamed G4W2 Xuguang Expressway); G107 Road
Guangzhou Metropolitan Area
(190)	S82 Foshan 1st Ring Expressway
(186)	S267 Road; Towards S118 Road; Tanbu
(178)	X497 Road; Leping
Foshan Metropolitan Area
(167)	X522 Road; Towards S269 Road; Foshan-North; Sanshui
(160 A-B)	G55 Erguang Expressway; S55 Erguang Expressway Guangzhou Branch
(156)	Qiaojin N. Ave. Foshan-East
(153)	G80 Guangkun Expressway
(148)	S269 Road; Baini-Danzao
Danzao Service Area
(139)	S5 Guangming Expressway
(133)	S113 Road Mount Xiqiao Foshan-Xiqiao, Nanzhuang
Concurrent with G1501 Guangzhou Ring Expressway
(118 A-B)	G1501 Guangzhou Ring Expressway; S15 Shenhai Expressway Guangzhou Branch
Jiujiang Bridge
Foshan Metropolitan Area
3110	G325 Road; Heshan-North
3117	S272 Road; Heshan-South
Yayao Service Area
	G94 Pearl River Delta Ring Expressway
3138	S26 Shenluo Expressway (To be renamed G2518 Shencen Expressway
Concurrent with S26 Shenluo Expressway (To be renamed G2518 Shencen Expressway
	S26 Shenluo Expressway (To be renamed G2518 Shencen Expressway
	S49 Xintai Expressway
3158	G325 Road; S364 Road; Shuikou
Liangjinshan Service Area
3170	Kaiping Ave. Kaiping
3174	S274 Road; Kaiping-Chacheng-Shatang
3182	X555 Road; Tangkou
3194	X534 Road; Towards G325 Road; Juntang-Shahu
3203	S369 Road; Towards G325 Road; Liangxi-Shengtang
3214	Jinjiang Ave. Middle Rd. Enping
3230	S367 Road; Towards G325 Road; Dahuai
Dahuai Service Area
3244	G325 Road; Nalong
3254	G325 Road; Heshan-Beiguan
3262	S32 Western Coastal Expressway
Yangjiang Urban Area
3270	Xiping N. Rd. Yangjiang-Centre
Yangjiang Service Area
3281	S277 Road; Yangjiang-Centre
	S51 Luoyang Expressway
Yangjiang Urban Area
3297	G325 Road; Chengcun
3312	S278 Road; Yangxi
Yangxi Service Area
3330	S282 Road; Xinxu
3340	X639 Road; Mata
3358	X640 Road; Guanzhu
3369	S281 Road; Lintou
	G65 Baomao Expressway; Dianbai
Maoming Urban Area
3382	S280 Road; Maoming-Centre
	X613 Road; X624 Road; Maoming-Zhensheng
Maoming Urban Area
3408	S285 Road; Changqi-Tongqing; Towards Huazhou
3422	X623 Road; Yangmei
3433	S286 Road; Tangzhui
Guandu Service Area
3442	G325 Road; Haidong Highway; Zhanjiang-East
3463	G325 Road; Suixi; Zhanjiang-West
	G75 Lanhai Expressway; S75 Lanhai Expressway Zhanjiang Branch
Concurrent with G75 Lanhai Expressway
	S374 Road; Zhanhai-West
	X684 Road; Towards G207 Road; Chengyue
Suixi Service Area
	G207 Road; Leizhou
Baisha Service Area
	S373 Road; Leizhou-Yangjia
	X692 Road; Towards G207 Road; Songzhu
Leizhou Service Area
	X699 Road; Towards G207 Road; Towards S290 Road; Longmen
	X699 Road; Towards G207 Road; Towards S290 Road; Yingli-Tandou
	X331 Road; Towards G207 Road; Xiaqiao
Xucheng Toll Station
	G207 Road; Xuwen
Planned to be continued to Hainan Province
From South to North

== Branch expressway ==
The Shenyang–Haikou Expressway has a branch expressway, the G15W Changshu–Taizhou Expressway, between the cities of Changshu, Jiangsu, and Taizhou, Zhejiang. The branch line splits off from the main expressway after the Sutong Bridge and passes through the cities of Suzhou, Jiaxing, and Shaoxing before rejoining the main expressway just north of Taizhou. The spur line is complete.

== Shenyang–Dalian Expressway Exits ==
Exit name	Approx. kilometers from start
Shenyang North (merging of G1113 with G1501)	0
Shenyang	3
Liaoyang	67
Anshan	92
Haicheng	128
Dashiqiao	160
Gaizhou	190
Xiongyuecheng	221
Wafangdian	295
Pulandian	322
Jinzhou	367
Dalian	400

== History ==
The Shenyang–Dalian Expressway was built between 1984 and 1990. The name combines the first character of each of the 2 cities, Shen and Da, making it the Shenda highway. It translates literally to Shenda high-speed roadway. Originally, it was a 4-lane freeway. It was rebuilt recently and now has 8 lanes.

== Controversy ==
Shenda highway is claimed to be the first expressway in China mainland. It was planned as an express highway but was actually built as a freeway. Due to its length (400 km (250 mi)), it was opened section by section. Although the entire route was not completed until 1990, its first section had already opened in 1986. By 1988, more than 100 km (62 mi) of the route was opened to public traffic. Its competitor, the Hujia Expressway, only 18.5 km (11.5 mi) long, also claimed to be the first expressway in mainland China. It was completed in 1988.
