= G9221 Hangzhou–Ningbo Expressway =

Expressway in Zhejiang, China

Hangzhou–Ningbo Expressway
- 杭州－宁波高速公路
- Hangyong Expressway 杭甬高速

Route information
- Auxiliary route of G92
- Length: 161 km (100 mi)

Major junctions
- West end: Nanyang IC of Hongshiwuxian Road, at Xiaoshan District, Hangzhou
- Sutai Expressway at Xiaoshan District, Hangzhou; G1522 at Yuecheng District, Shaoxing; Ciyu Expressway at Yuyao, Ningbo; G15, concurrent at Cixi, Ningbo; G9211 at Zhenhai District, Ningbo
- East end: Chaiqiao JCT, at Beilun District, Ningbo (when complete)

Location
- Country: China

Highway system
- National Trunk Highway System; Primary; Auxiliary; National Highways; Transport in China
| ← G9211 | → G93 |

The Hangzhou−Ningbo Expressway (simplified Chinese: 杭州−宁波高速公路; traditional Chinese: 杭州−寧波高速公路), commonly referred to as Hangyong Expressway (Chinese: 杭甬高速) or Hangshaoyong Expressway (Chinese: 杭绍甬高速), is an expressway in Zhejiang, China which links from Hangzhou, through Shaoxing to Ningbo. Its length is 161 km. In the National Trunk Highway System (NTHS) in China, the number of this highway is G9221. It was planned in Zhejiang provincial expressway system as S17 west of Andong junction, and S18 east of Fuhai junction, before introducing in NTHS.

Construction of G9221 started on 26 June 2017. As of January 2024, Hangzhou & Shaoxing sections, as well as phase 1 of Ningbo section are completed and opened for traffic, phase 2 of Ningbo section was opened on 11 April 2025. the rest (phase 3) of Ningbo section will be completed in 2026~2027. There are plans to promote the maximum speed limit of G9221 to 150 km/h once completed.

== List of exits and service areas ==
| District/County | Location | km | Junction | Destinations | Notes |
|---|---|---|---|---|---|
| Xiaoshan District, Hangzhou | Nanyang | | | Hongshiwuxian Road; Kanhong Road (under construction) | Once ramps to Kanhong Road completed, it will provide traffic to Hangzhou Airport |
| Xiaoshan District, Hangzhou | Hezhuang | | | Hongshiwuxian Road; Hezhuang Road | Eastbond entrance and westbond exit |
| Xiaoshan District, Hangzhou | Jingjiang | | | Hongshiwuxian Road; S. Qingliu Road | Westbond entrance and eastbond exit Near Yongsheng Road of Line 7 and Line 19, Xinzhen Road of Line 7 |
| Xiaoshan District, Hangzhou | Xieyi | | | Hongshiwuxian Road | A junction connect to an unknown-name road is construction |
| Xiaoshan District, Hangzhou | Dangwan | | | Hongshiwuxian Road; Sanyuan Road | |
| Xiaoshan District, Hangzhou | Dangwan Trunk | | — | | Toll booth |
| Xiaoshan District, Hangzhou | Dangwan JCT | | | Sutai Expressway – towards Jiaxing on the north, and Linhai on the south | |
| Qiantang District, Hangzhou | Linjiangnan | | | Xinshiji Avenue | |
| Xiaoshan District, Hangzhou | Yinong | | Service area | — | |
| Keqiao District, Shaoxing | Ma'an | | | Xindongxian Road; Xingbin Road; Kehai Avenue | |
| Yuecheng District, Shaoxing | Shaoxing North | | | N. Yuedong Road | |
| Yuecheng District, Shaoxing | Binhaixincheng JCT | | | G1522 – towards Jiaxing on the north, and Sanmen County on the south | |
| Shangyu District, Shaoxing | Songxia | | | Zhenxing Avenue | |
| Shangyu District, Shaoxing | Gaibei | | | Zhenxing Avenue | Section east of Gaibei under construction |
| Shangyu District, Shaoxing | Shangyu | | Service area | — | |
| Yuyao, Ningbo | Linshan | | | | |
| Yuyao, Ningbo | Simen North | | | Gubei Road | |
| Yuyao, Ningbo | Xiaocaoe JCT | | | Ciyu Expressway; Taosheng Road – towards southern of Yuyao; Kexing Road | |
| Cixi, Ningbo | Andongxi | | | Zhouan Highway | |
| Cixi, Ningbo | Andong JCT / W. Hangzhou Bay New Zone | | | G15 – towards Shanghai via Hangzhou Bay Bridge; G228 (Binhai 1st Road); Hangzhouwan Avenue | Start of G15 concurrency, and a very short concurrent section with G228 within the junction |
| Cixi, Ningbo | Cixi (E. Hangzhou Bay New Zone) | | | E. Third Ring Road | |
| Cixi, Ningbo | Yanglong | | | | |
| Cixi, Ningbo | Fuhai JCT | | | G15 – towards northwest of Ningbo urban area | End of G15 concurrency, westbond entrance and eastbond exit |
| Cixi, Ningbo | Cidong | | | N. Cidong Avenue; Fangsong Road | |
| Cixi, Ningbo | Longshan | | | S. Cidong Avenue; Zhenlong 3rd Road | |
| Zhenhai District, Ningbo | Xiepu | | | N. Wanghai Road, Niluoshan Road | |
| Zhenhai District, Ningbo | Binhai JCT | | | G9211 – towards northeast of Ningbo urban area on the southwest, and Zhoushan on the northeast | |
| Zhenhai District, Ningbo | Zhaobaoshan | | | Weihai Road, Haitian Road | De facto east termini until 2027 |
1.000 mi = 1.609 km; 1.000 km = 0.621 mi: Concurrency terminus; Incomplete access; Unopened
