= S80 =

S80 or S-80 may refer to:

== Automobiles ==
- Daihatsu Hijet (S80), a kei truck and microvan
- FAW Senya S80, a crossover
- Toyota Crown (S80), a sedan
- Volvo S80, an executive car

== Aviation ==
- Idaho County Airport, in Grangeville, Idaho, United States
- Short S.80, a British floatplane
- Sikorsky S-80, an American helicopter

== Consumer electronics ==
- Canon PowerShot S80, a digital camera
- Series 80 (software platform), for mobile phones
- Yamaha S80, an electric piano

== Roads ==
- County Route S80 (California), United States
- County Route S80 (Bergen County, New Jersey), United States
- S80 Port of Taicang North Port Expressway, China

== Submarines ==
- Soviet submarine S-80
- S-80 Plus-class submarine, of the Spanish Navy

== Other uses ==
- S80, a line of the Vienna S-Bahn in Austria
- S80, a postcode district for Worksop, England

== See also ==
- Super 80, aircraft of the McDonnell Douglas MD-80 series
