= Yeda =

Yeda may refer to:

- Yeda Crusius (born 1944), Brazilian economist, politician, governor
- Yeda Pessoa de Castro, Brazilian ethnolinguist
- Yeda Peak, mountain peak in the Spectrum Range of northwestern British Columbia, Canada
- Yantai Economic and Technological Development Zone, Shandong Province, China
- Yeda Research and Development Company, the technology transfer organization for the Weizmann Institute of Science in Israel
- Etadunna Airstrip, ICAO airport code "YEDA"
