= China National Highway 204 =

Road in China

National Highway 204
- 204国道

Route information
- Length: 1,031 km (641 mi)

Major junctions
- From: Yantai in Shandong
- To: Shanghai

Location
- Country: China

Highway system
- National Trunk Highway System; Primary; Auxiliary
← G203	→ G205

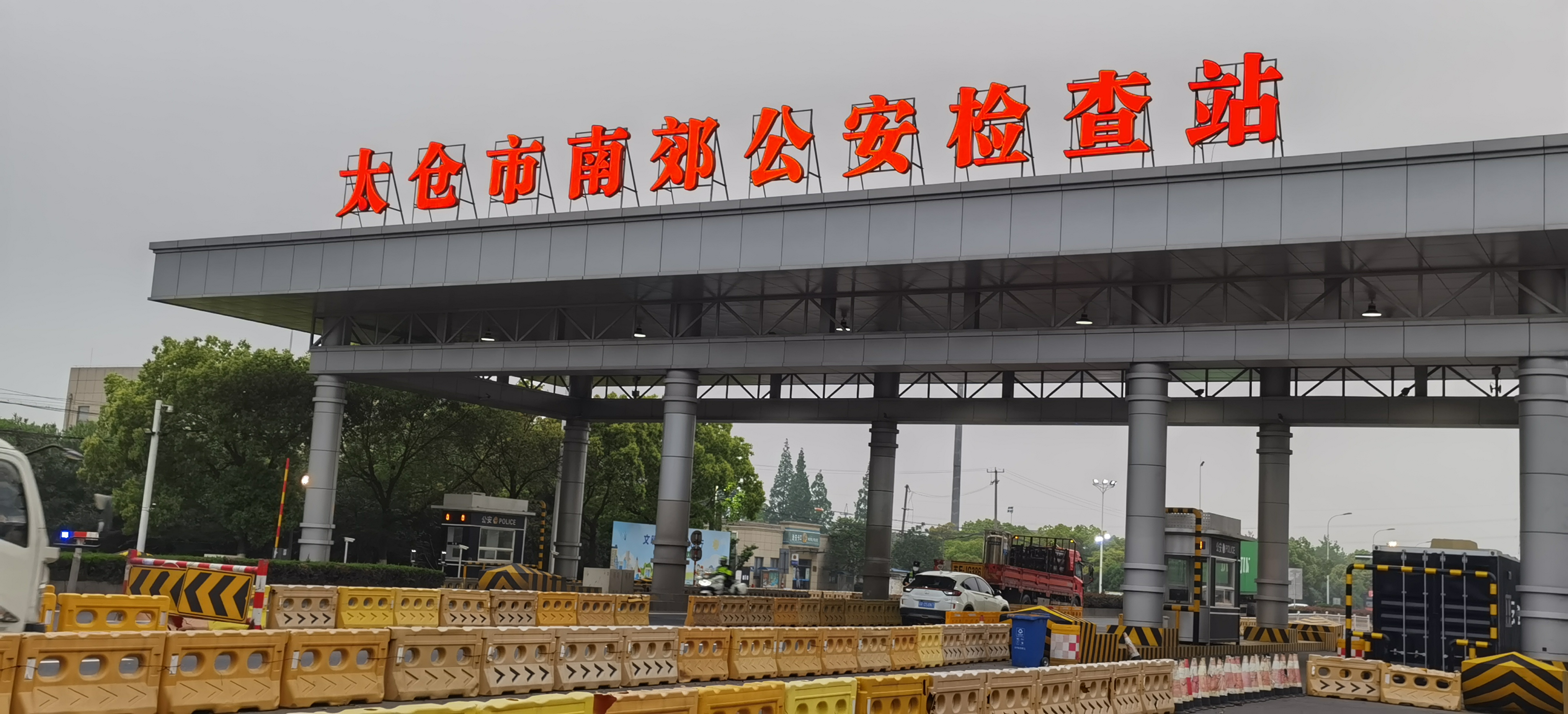
Southeast of the intersection of Huyi Highway and Xinfeng Road, Taicang City, Suzhou, Jiangsu-Shanghai border Located on National Highway 204

China National Highway 204 (G204) runs from Yantai in Shandong Province to Shanghai. It is 1,031 kilometres in length and runs south from Yantai, going via Shandong and Jiangsu Province, and ends in Shanghai.

== Route and distance ==
Route and distance

City	Distance (km)
Yantai, Shandong	0
Fushan District, Shandong	13
Qixia, Shandong	69
Laiyang, Shandong	112
Laixi, Shandong	136
Jimo, Shandong	193
Jiaozhou, Shandong	240
Jiaonan, Shandong	287
Donggang District, Shandong	364
Lanshan District, Shandong	
Ganyu, Jiangsu	438
Lianyungang, Jiangsu	480
Guanyun, Jiangsu	517
Xiangshui, Jiangsu	552
Binhai County, Jiangsu	587
Funing County, Jiangsu	617
Yancheng, Jiangsu	676
Dongtai, Jiangsu	744
Hai'an County, Jiangsu	789
Rugao, Jiangsu	813
Nantong, Jiangsu	865
Changshu, Jiangsu	926
Taicang, Jiangsu	978
Jiading, Shanghai	998
Shanghai, Shanghai	1031

== See also ==
- China National Highways
