= Ye Hanbing =

Chinese politician

- 叶寒冰

Vice Governor of Sichuan
- In office January 2018 – May 2025
- Governor: Yin Li
- Preceded by: Deng Yong
- Succeeded by: Huang Ruixue

Personal details
- Born: October 1965 (age 60–61) Sanmen County, Zhejiang, China
- Party: Chinese Communist Party (1985-2025, expelled)
- Education: Zhejiang Provincial People's Police School; Zhejiang University; Hong Kong Polytechnic University; Central Party School of the Chinese Communist Party

Chinese name
- Simplified Chinese: 叶寒冰
- Traditional Chinese: 葉寒冰
Transcriptions
Standard Mandarin
- Hanyu Pinyin: Yè Hánbīng

Ye Hanbing (Chinese: 叶寒冰; born October 1965) is a former Chinese politician who spent his entire career in both Zhejiang and Sichuan provinces. He was investigated by China's top anti-graft agency in May 2025. Previously he served as vice governor of Sichuan, director of Sichuan Provincial Public Security Department and deputy secretary of the Political and Legal Affairs Commission of the CCP Sichuan Provincial Committee.

== Early life and education ==
Ye was born in Sanmen County, Zhejiang, in October 1965. He graduated from Zhejiang Provincial People's Police School, Zhejiang University, Hong Kong Polytechnic University, and Central Party School of the Chinese Communist Party.

== Career ==
Ye taught at Jiantiao Middle School and Huashi Middle School in his home-county from August 1982 to August 1984. He joined the Chinese Communist Party (CCP) in October 1985 when he studied at Zhejiang Provincial People's Police School. Starting in August 1986, he served in several posts in Zhejiang Provincial Public Security Department, including office secretary, deputy director of the 3rd Division, and chief of the Public Security Corps. He served as director of Huzhou Municipal Public Security Bureau from 2004 to 2009 and director of Wenzhou Municipal Public Security Bureau from 2009 to 2012. He eventually became deputy director of the Zhejiang Provincial Public Security Department in January 2012. He was also admitted to standing committee member of the CCP Hangzhou Municipal Committee, the city's top authority.

In January 2018, Ye was transferred to southwest China's Sichuan province and appointed vice governor. He concurrently served as director of Sichuan Provincial Public Security Department and deputy secretary of the Political and Legal Affairs Commission of the CCP Sichuan Provincial Committee.

== Downfall ==
On 21 May 2025, Ye was suspected of "serious violations of laws and regulations" by the Central Commission for Discipline Inspection (CCDI), the party's internal disciplinary body, and the National Supervisory Commission, the highest anti-corruption agency of China. He was expelled from the Party and the public office on 24 November.

Government offices
Preceded by Deng Yong	Director of Sichuan Provincial Public Security Department; 2018–2025	Succeeded by Huang Ruixue
