= G1522 Changshu–Taizhou Expressway =

Expressway in China

Changshu–Taizhou Expressway
- 常熟－台州高速公路
- Changtai Expressway 常台高速公路

Route information
- Auxiliary route of G15
- Length: 339 km (211 mi) Length when complete.

Major junctions
- North end: G15 / Jiangsu S38 in Changshu, Suzhou, Jiangsu
- G2 / G42 in Suzhou, Jiangsu; G50 in Suzhou, Jiangsu; Zhejiang S12 in Jiaxing, Zhejiang; G60 in Jiaxing, Zhejiang; G92 in Haining, Jiaxing, Zhejiang (under construction); G92 in Shangyu, Shaoxing, Zhejiang; G1512 in Shengzhou, Shaoxing, Zhejiang
- South end: G15 in Sanmen County, Taizhou, Zhejiang

Location
- Country: China

Highway system
- National Trunk Highway System; Primary; Auxiliary; National Highways; Transport in China
| ← G1521 | → G1523 |

The Changshu–Taizhou Expressway (Chinese: 常熟—台州高速公路; pinyin: Chángshú–Tāizhōu Gāosù Gōnglù), designated as G1522 and commonly referred to as the Changtai Expressway (Chinese: 常台高速公路; pinyin: Chángtāi Gāosù Gōnglù), is an expressway that connects the cities of Changshu, a satellite city of Suzhou, in the province of Jiangsu, China, and Taizhou, in the province of Zhejiang. When fully complete, it will be 339 km (211 mi) in length. The expressway is a spur of the G15 Shenyang–Haikou Expressway. The spur line splits off from the main expressway at Changshu and passes through the cities of Suzhou, Jiaxing, and Shaoxing before rejoining the main expressway just north of Taizhou, Zhejiang.

The expressway was finished when a section between Jiaxing and Shaoxing, which includes a bridge over the Hangzhou Bay, was constructed in 2013. This bridge was the second bridge over the bay, the first being the Hangzhou Bay Bridge, which carries the G15 Shenyang–Haikou Expressway and the G92 Hangzhou Bay Ring Expressway.
