= Houlong (disambiguation) =

Houlong is an urban township in western Miaoli County, Taiwan.

Houlong may also refer to:

- Houlong railway station, a railway station on the Taiwan Railways Administration West Coast line
- Houlong River, a river in northwestern Taiwan
- Houlong Town (后龙镇), Quangang, Quanzhou, Fujian Province, China
- Houlong Village (后隆村), Qiaodun, Cangnan County, Wenzhou City, Zhejiang Province, China
- Houlong Village (后垅村), Baiyang Township, Xiapu County, Ningde City, Fujian Province, China
- Houlong Village (後龍里), West District, Taichung, Taiwan
