= G1517 Putian–Yanling Expressway =

Road in China

Putian–Yanling Expressway
- 莆田－炎陵高速公路
- Puyan Expressway 莆炎高速公路

Route information
- Auxiliary route of G15
- Length: 706 km (439 mi)

Major junctions
- West end: G0422 in Yanling County, Zhuzhou, Hunan
- East end: G15 in Xiuyu District, Putian, Fujian

Location
- Country: China

Highway system
- National Trunk Highway System; Primary; Auxiliary; National Highways; Transport in China
| ← G1516 | → G1518 |

The G1517 Putian–Yanling Expressway (Chinese: 莆田—炎陵高速公路), also referred to as the Puyan Expressway (Chinese: 莆炎高速公路), is an expressway in China that connects Putian, Fujian to Yanling County, Hunan.

== Route ==
The expressway starts in Xiuyu District, Putian, before passing through Fuzhou (Fujian), Sanming, Fuzhou (Jiangxi), Ganzhou and Ji'an, before terminating in Yanling County, Zhuzhou.

The route travels through the provinces of Fujian, Jiangxi and Hunan.
