= China National Highway 326 =

Road in China

National Highway 326
- 326国道

Route information
- Length: 1,562 km (971 mi)

Major junctions
- From: Xiushui, Chongqing
- To: Hekou, Yunnan

Location
- Country: China

Highway system
- National Trunk Highway System; Primary; Auxiliary
← G325	→ G327

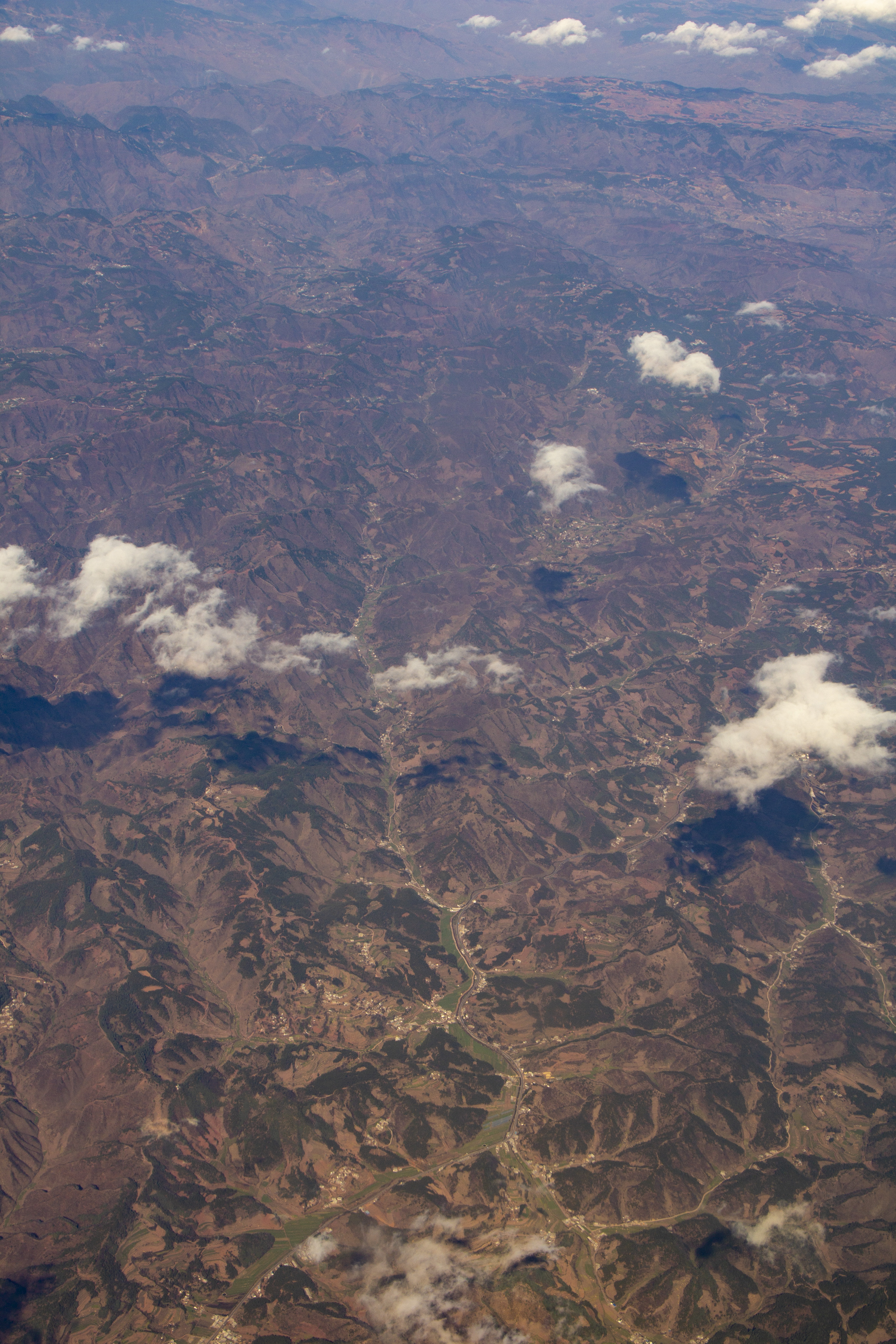
A part of G326.

China National Highway 326 (G326) runs southwest from Xiushui, Chongqing towards Guizhou Province, and ends in Hekou, Yunnan Province, which borders the northern Vietnamese town of Lào Cai. It is 1,562 kilometres in length.

== Route and distance ==
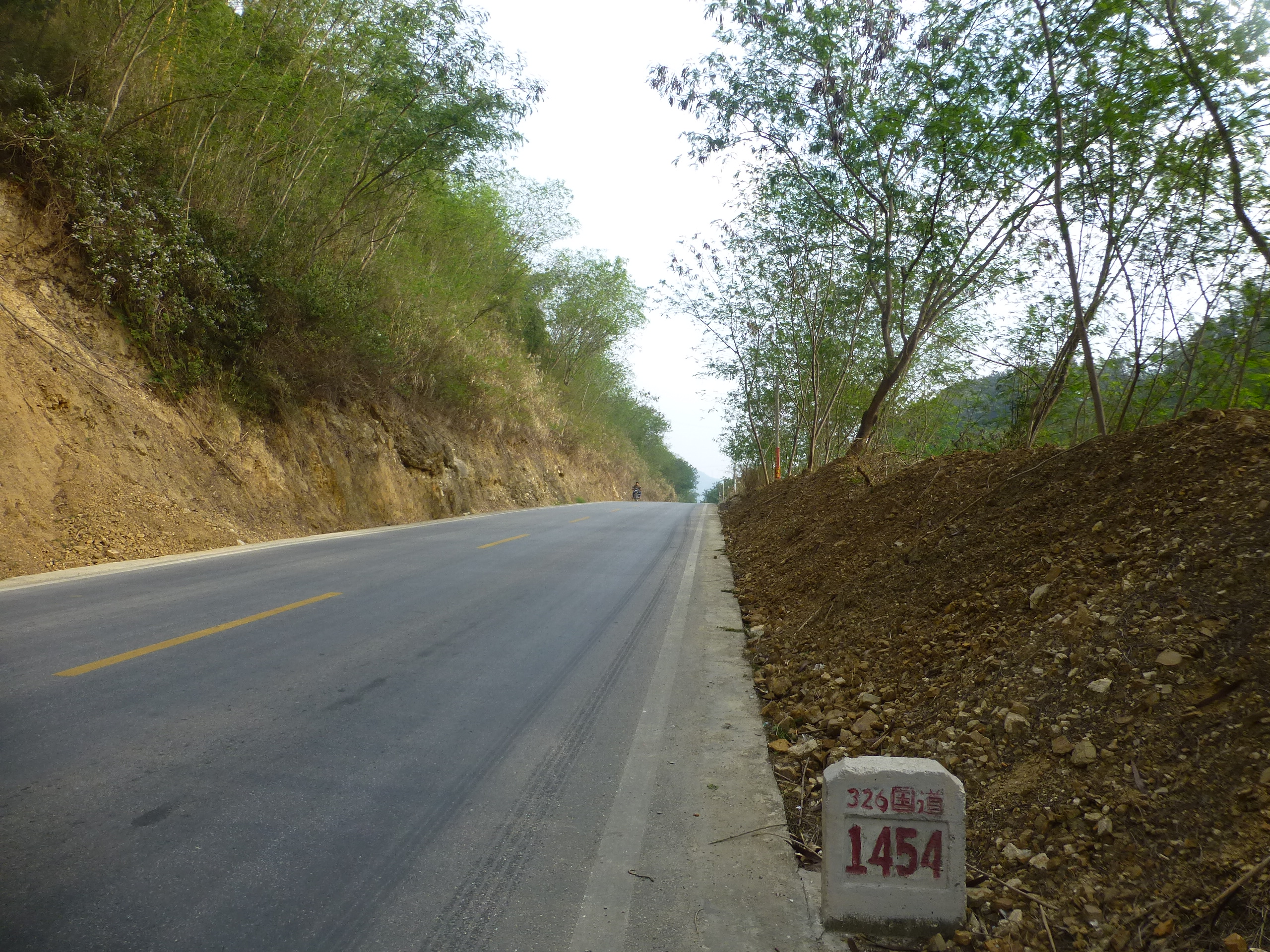
On G326 in Lianhuatan Township, Hekou County

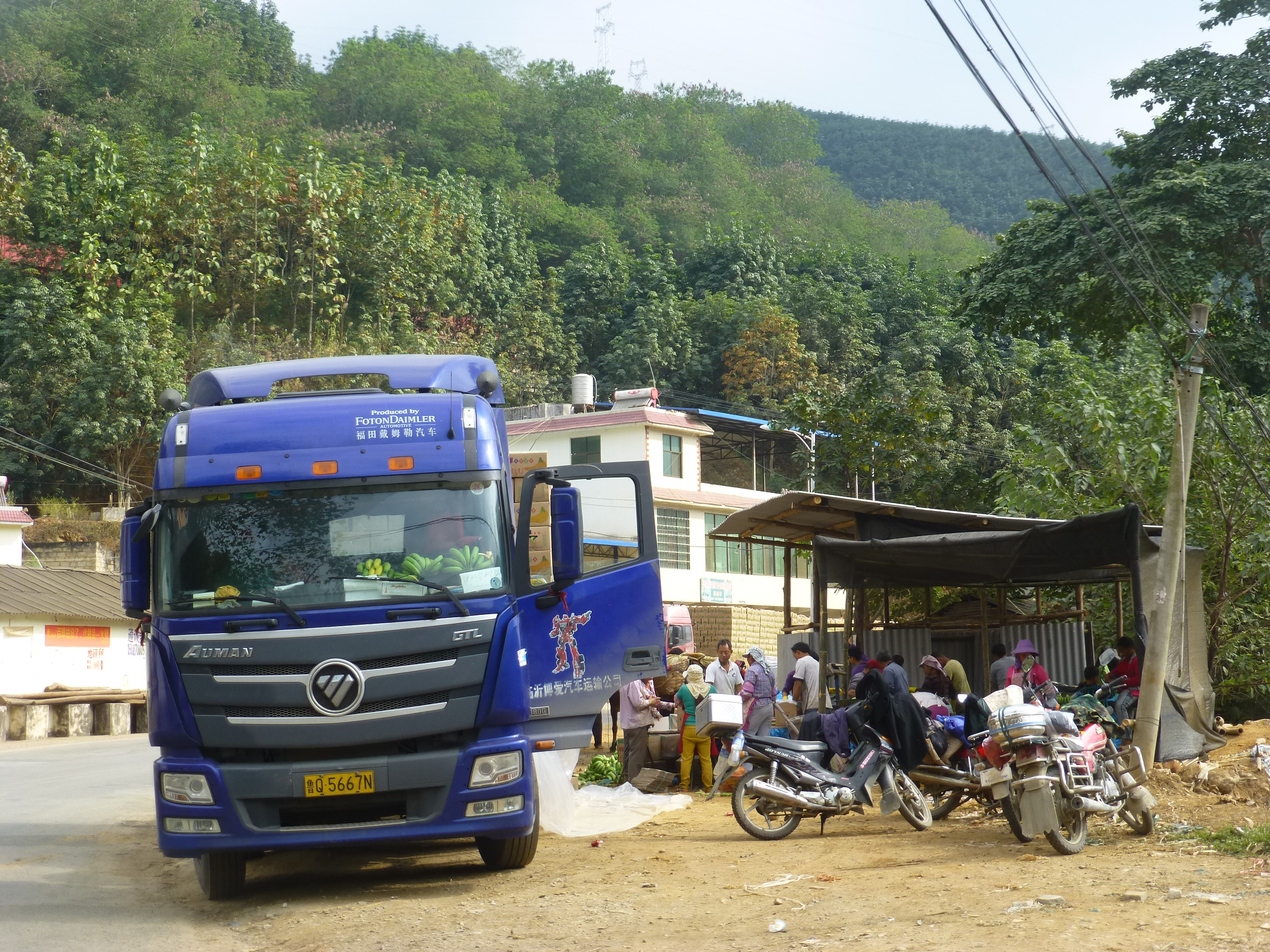
Loading a banana truck (Hekou County). Bananas are a major cargo on this part of the highway.

Route and distance

City	Distance (km)
Xiushan, Chongqing	0
Yanhe, Guizhou	97
Dejiang, Guizhou	186
Fenggang County, Guizhou	254
Meitan, Guizhou	294
Zunyi, Guizhou	373
Jinsha County, Guizhou	463
Dafang, Guizhou	572
Bijie, Guizhou	622
Hezhang, Guizhou	716
Weining, Guizhou	791
Xuanwei, Yunnan	963
Zhanyi, Yunnan	1053
Qujing, Yunnan	1066
Luliang County, Yunnan	1132
Shilin, Yunnan	1192
Mile County, Yunnan	1248
Kaiyuan, Yunnan	1337
Mengzi County, Yunnan	1394
Hekou, Yunnan	1562

== See also ==
- China National Highways
