= Qingzhou Bridge =

Qingzhou Bridge 青洲大桥
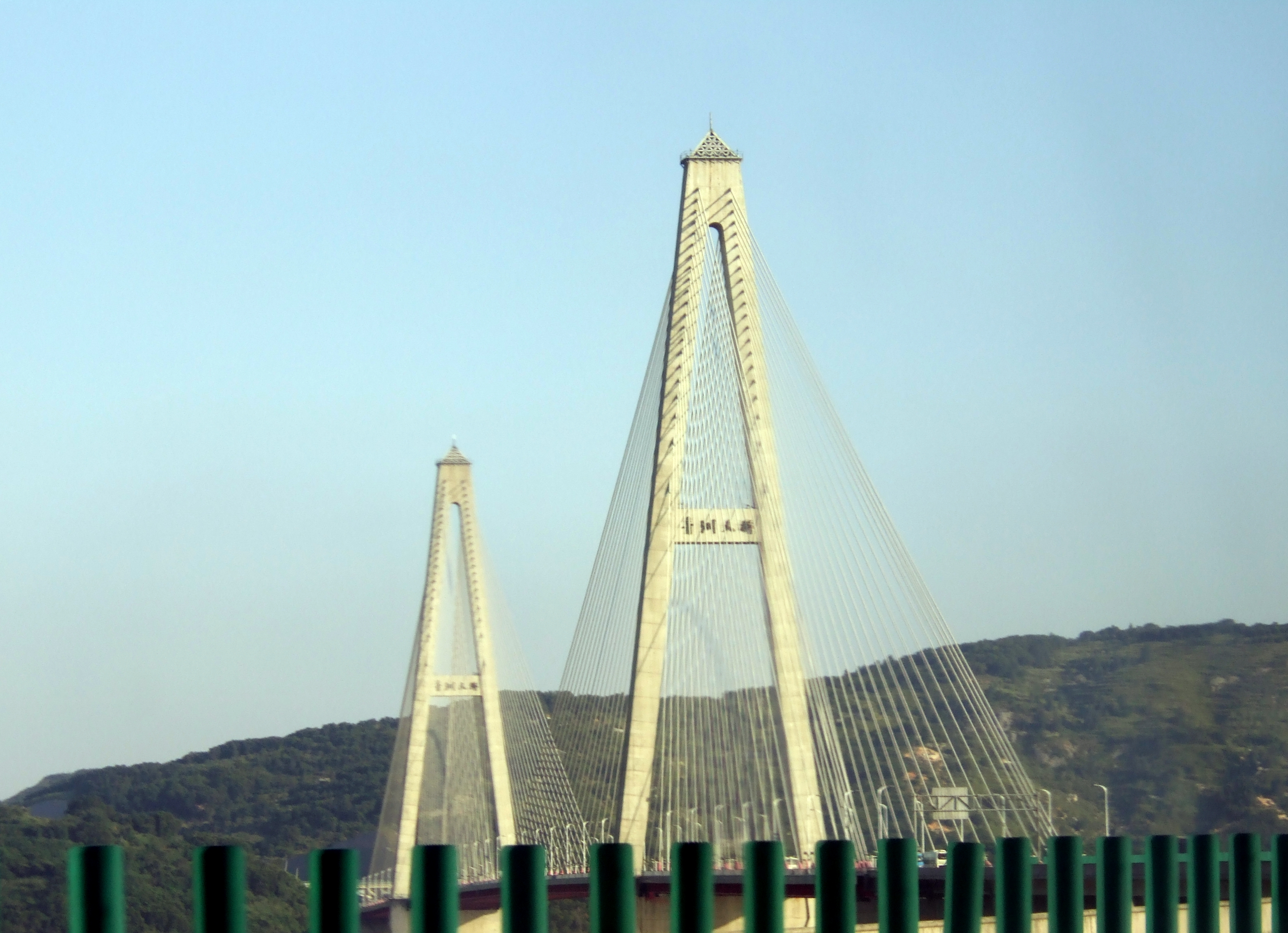
- Coordinates: 25.98775°N 119.471528°E
- Carries: 6 lanes of G15 Shenhai Expressway and the S1531 Airport Expressway
- Crosses: Min River
- Locale: Fuzhou, Fujian, China
- Owner: Fuzhou Municipal Government

Characteristics
- Design: Cable-stayed
- Total length: 1,196 m (3,923.9 ft)
- Width: 29 m (95.1 ft)
- Height: 175.5 m (575.8 ft)
- Longest span: 605 m (1,984.9 ft)
- No. of spans: 1
- Piers in water: 2

History
- Construction start: 1998
- Construction cost: $80 million
- Opened: 2001

Statistics
- Daily traffic: 60,000
- Toll: ¥2000

Location
- Interactive map of Qingzhou Bridge

The Qingzhou Minjiang Bridge, also known as the Qingzhou Bridge, is a cable-stayed bridge over the Min River in Fuzhou, Fujian, China. The bridge's main span is 605 metres (1,985 ft) placing it among the largest cable-stayed bridges in the world, the span arrangement is 250+605+250 m. The bridge carries six lanes of traffic on the G15 Shenyang–Haikou Expressway and the S1531 Airport Expressway.

== See also ==
- List of bridges in China
- List of longest cable-stayed bridge spans
- List of tallest bridges
