= G92 Hangzhou Bay Ring Expressway =

Beltway in Shanghai and Zhejiang, China

Hangzhou Bay Ring Expressway
- 杭州湾地区环线高速公路
- Hangzhou Bay Ring Expressway 杭州湾环线高速

- Map of the Expressway in Zhejiang Province

Route information
- Length: 427 km (265 mi)

Major junctions
- North end: G1503 / G60 in Shanghai Shanghai S32 in Shanghai; Shanghai S36 in Jiaxing, Zhejiang; G1521 / G60 in Jiaxing, Zhejiang; G15 / G1521- Zhejiang S11 / Zhejiang S16 in Jiaxing, Zhejiang; Western portion of loop: G1522(under construction)- Zhejiang S16 in Jiaxing, Zhejiang; G2504 / G60- Zhejiang S16 in Jiaxing, Zhejiang; G2504 / G60 in Hangzhou, Zhejiang; G2504 / G60- Zhejiang S2 in Hangzhou, Zhejiang; G1522 in Shaoxing, Zhejiang; G15 / G1504- Zhejiang S5 in Ningbo, Zhejiang; Eastern portion of loop: G15 / G9221 in Ningbo, Zhejiang G15 / G1504 in Ningbo, Zhejiang
- South end: Zhejiang S5- Zhejiang S1 in Ningbo, Zhejiang

Location
- Country: China

Highway system
- National Trunk Highway System; Primary; Auxiliary; National Highways; Transport in China
← G9111	→ G9211

The Hangzhou Bay Ring Expressway (simplified Chinese: 杭州湾环线高速; traditional Chinese: 杭州灣環線高速), officially the Hangzhou Bay Region Ring Expressway (simplified Chinese: 杭州湾地区环线高速公路; traditional Chinese: 杭州灣地區環線高速公路) and designated G92, is an expressway in China that connects the city of Shanghai to the cities of Hangzhou and Ningbo in the neighbouring province of Zhejiang. Part of its route traverses the Hangzhou Bay Bridge. It is 427 km (265 mi) in length.

== Route ==
Its name as a ring expressway partially incorrect because the expressway has a northern terminus in Shanghai. It can be considered an orbital expressway with an extra section of roadway not part of the orbital to its north and east. This extra section extends from an interchange with the orbital and two other expressways, the S11 Zhapu–Jiaxing–Suzhou Expressway and the G15 Shenyang–Haikou Expressway, in Jiaxing, Zhejiang, to an interchange with G1503 Shanghai Ring Expressway at Dagang Interchange, Songjiang District, Shanghai.

=== The orbital ===
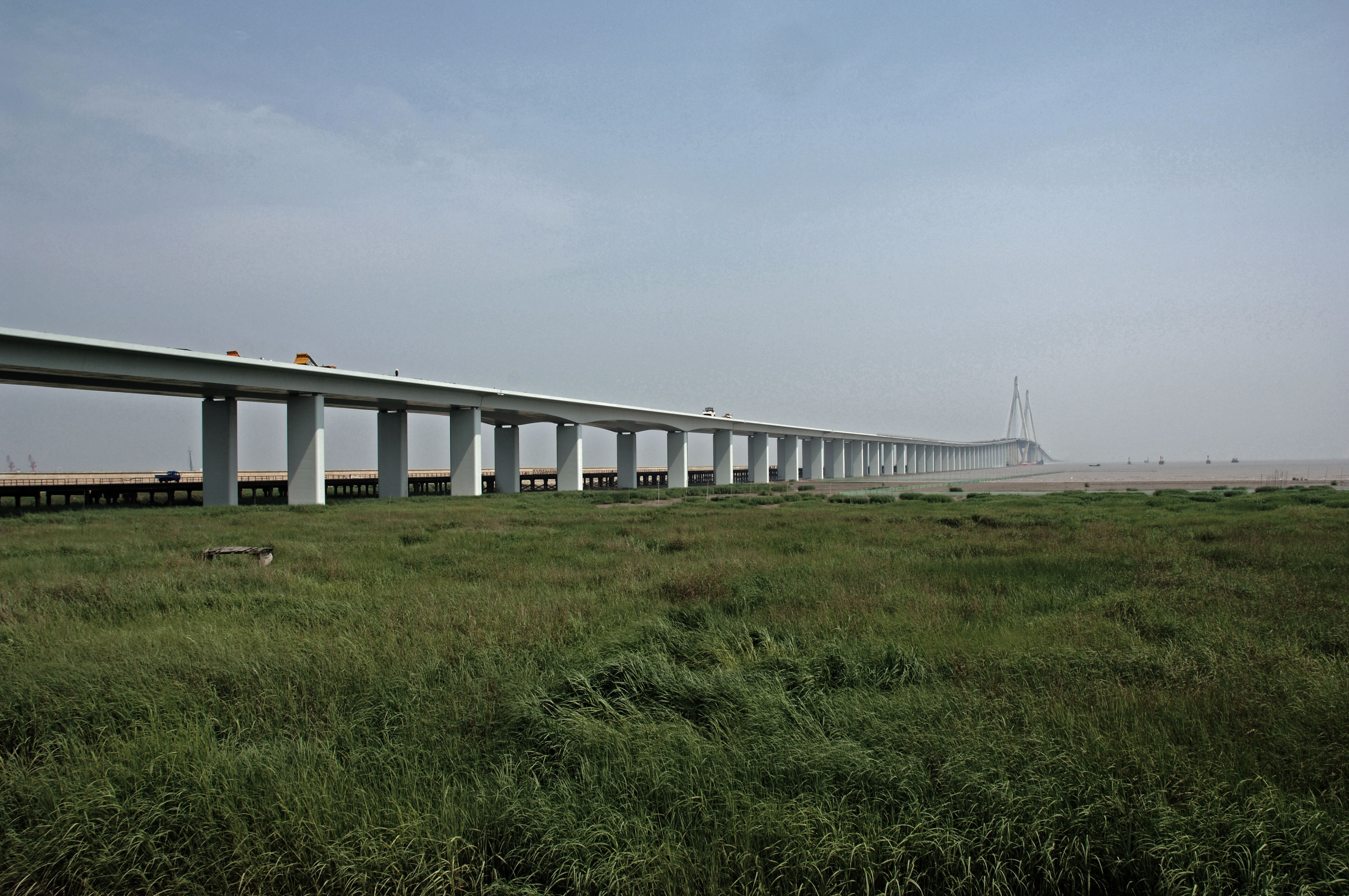
The Hangzhou Bay Bridge carries six lanes of G92 Hangzhou Bay Ring Expressway and G15 Shenyang–Haikou Expressway

The ring of the Hangzhou Bay Ring Expressway is entirely in Zhejiang Province. It begins at its southern end in Gaoqiao, Yinzhou District, Ningbo, at an interchange with the G15 Shenyang–Haikou Expressway and the G1504 Ningbo Ring Expressway. Clockwise, it follows the southern shore of Hangzhou Bay to Hangzhou, where it turns north and becomes concurrent with G60 Shanghai–Kunming Expressway and G2504 Hangzhou Ring Expressway. The G2504 Hangzhou Ring Expressway eventually splits off to the west at an interchange in Jianggan District, and the Hangzhou Bay Ring Expressway turns to the east as it splits with the G60 Shanghai–Kunming Expressway. The expressway continues eastward, following the north shore of Hangzhou Bay until it reaches an interchange with the S11 Zhapu–Jiaxing–Suzhou Expressway and the G15 Shenyang–Haikou Expressway in Jiaxing. At this interchange, the extra, non-orbital section of expressway to Shanghai branches off to the north while the orbital continues to the south and crosses the bay using the Hangzhou Bay Bridge. This section, including the Hangzhou Bay Bridge, is concurrent with the G15 Shenyang–Haikou Expressway. After the bridge, the expressway continues south past Cixi City to an interchange with G9211 Ningbo–Zhoushan Expressway and G1504 Ningbo Ring Expressway. It continues south in a concurrency with G15 Shenyang-Haikou Expressway and G1504 Ningbo Ring Expressway for a short section in Yinzhou District before returning to its southern terminus.

=== The section to Shanghai ===
The section to Shanghai is not part of the ring or loop but is designated part of the expressway. It begins on the north side of the Hangzhou Bay Bridge, at an interchange with the S11 Zhapu–Jiaxing–Suzhou Expressway and the G15 Shenyang–Haikou Expressway, where it leaves the orbital section of the expressway. It travels north in a section concurrent with the S7 Hangzhou Bay Bridge North Connector Line to an interchange with G60 Shanghai–Kunming Expressway. At this interchange, the expressway turns eastward and is concurrent with G60 to Shanghai, where the expressway ends at an interchange with the G1503 Shanghai Ring Expressway at Dagang Interchange.
