= Ebu =

Ebu 鹅埠镇
- Town
- Location in Guangdong
- Coordinates: 22°49′43″N 114°59′56″E
- Country: People's Republic of China
- Province: Guangdong
- Prefecture-level city: Shanwei
- County: Haifeng
- Village-level divisions: 1 residential community 9 villages
- Elevation: 3.7 m (12 ft)
- Time zone: UTC+8 (China Standard)
- Postal code: 516473
- Area code: 0660

Ebu (simplified Chinese: 鹅埠; traditional Chinese: 鵝埠; pinyin: Ébù) is a town of Haifeng County in eastern Guangdong province, China, located 6 kilometres (3.7 mi) from the South China Sea coast and 36 km (22 mi) southwest of the county seat and served by China National Highway 324. As of 2011, it has one residential community (社区) and nine villages under its administration.
