= China National Highway 327 =

Road in China

National Highway 327
- 327国道

Route information
- Length: 2,024 km (1,258 mi)

Major junctions
- From: Heze, Shandong
- To: Lianyungang, Jiangsu

Location
- Country: China

Highway system
- National Trunk Highway System; Primary; Auxiliary
| ← G326 | → G328 |

China National Highway 327 (G327) runs southeast from Guyuan, Ningxia via Heze, Shandong towards Lianyungang, Jiangsu. It is 2,024 kilometres in length. It was extended to Guyuan in the 2013 National Highway Network Plan.

== Route and distance ==
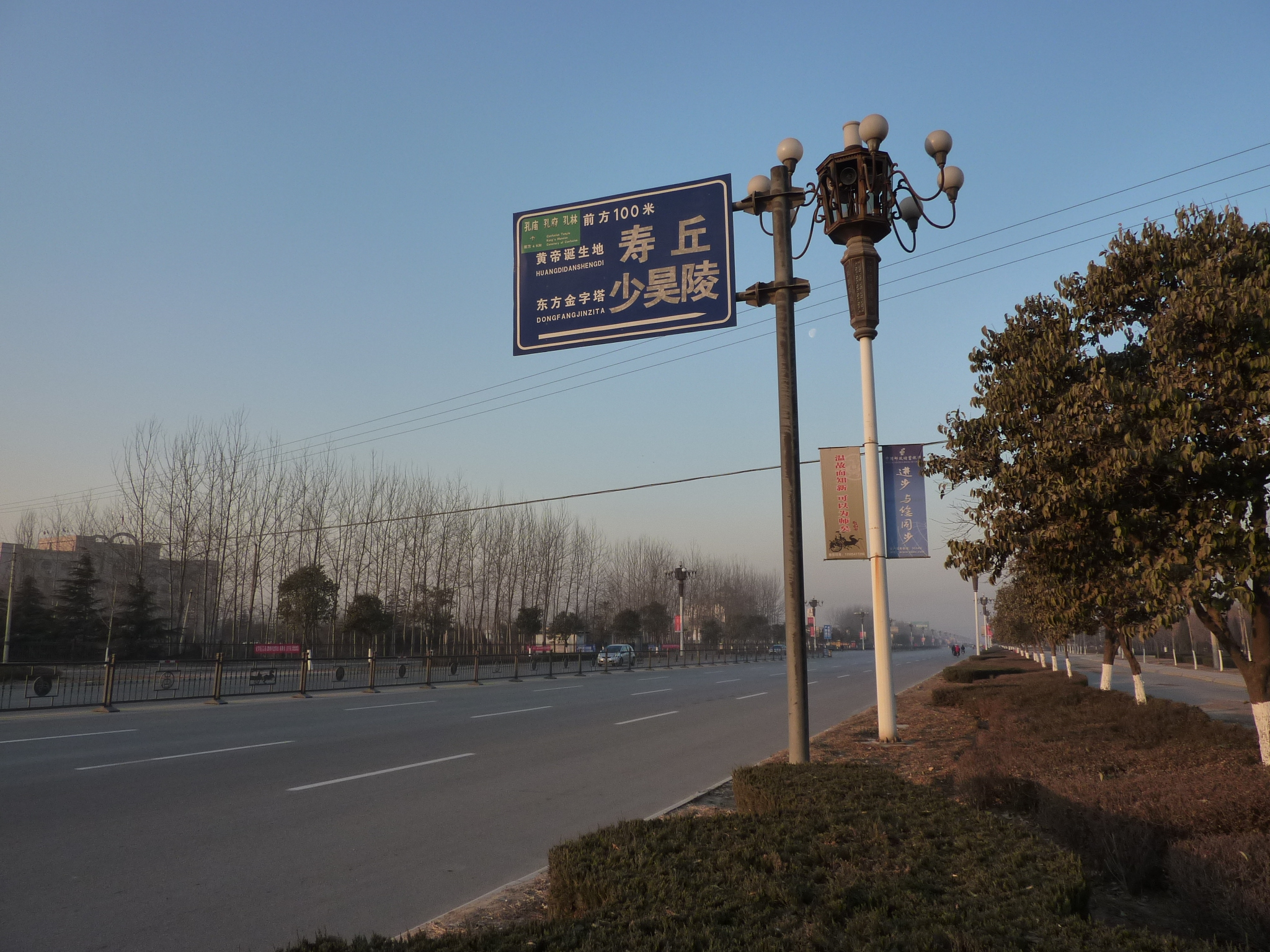
G327 on the eastern outskirts of Qufu (near the turnoff for Shou Qiu and Shaohao Tomb)

Route and distance

| City | Distance (km) |
|---|---|
| Guyuan, Ningxia | |
| Pengyang County | |
| Zhenyuan County, Gansu | |
| Qingyang City (Xifeng District) | |
| Heze, Shandong | 0 |
| Juye, Shandong | 163 |
| Jiaxiang County, Shandong | 286 |
| Jining, Shandong | 310 |
| Yanzhou, Shandong | 538 |
| Qufu, Shandong | 654 |
| Sishui, Shandong | 721 |
| Pingyi, Shandong | 1123 |
| Fei County, Shandong | 1167 |
| Linyi, Shandong | 1207 |
| Linshu, Shandong | 1345 |
| Lianyungang, Jiangsu | 2024 |

== See also ==
- China National Highways
