= Zhifu Island =

Island in Shandong, China

Native name: Chih-fu tao
- Location within Shandong

Geography
- Coordinates: 37°36′43.4″N 121°22′46.3″E
- Area: 11.5 km^{2} (4.4 sq mi)
- Coastline: 22.5 km (13.98 mi)
- Highest elevation: 294.1 m (964.9 ft)
- Highest point: Laoye Mountain (老爺山 Lǎoyé Shān)

Administration
- China

Additional information
- Average temperature: 11.4–13.5°C

Zhifu Island (Chinese: 芝罘島; pinyin: Zhīfú dǎo; Wade–Giles: Chih-fu tao) or North Island (Chinese: 北島; pinyin: Běi dǎo; Wade–Giles: Pei tao), is an islet with historical significance in Shandong Province, China. The name of the islet Chefoo was generalized to mean the entire Yantai region in older western literature.

== Etymologies ==
Possibilities include:

1. "A Barrier in the Shape of a Magical Plant"
  - Zhi is a magical and powerful plant, which the island's shape resembles
  - Fu a barrier of ocean
2. A magical mountain name (significance unknown)
  - From Qin dynasty's Zhifu (之罘), officially changed to the present character during the late Qing dynasty.

== Administration ==
Administratively, Zhifu Island is a part of Dàtuǎn Village (大疃村), Xingfu Sub-district, Zhifu District, Yantai City, Shandong Province. Dàtuǎn has a part on the mainland, where the offices and most residents are.

== History ==
Archeological excavations have uncovered over 200 artifacts, including stone axes, and short axes (錛 : Bēn), pottery fragments, bone needles, and bone hairpins. These and Carbon-14 dating indicated that the island has been settled since the Neolithic period.

People were buried here during the Zhou dynasty, including Duke Kang of Qi, who died on the island in 379 BC. The ruins of the cemetery still exist today. The Lord Yang Temple (陽主廟 Yángzhǔ Miào) was built during the early Zhou dynasty by rulers of the State of Qí in honor of Lord Yang, the fifth deity of the Eight Divine Generals (八神將).

Because of a legend of a Mountain of Immortality, China's first emperor Qin Shi Huang is traditionally said to have visited the island while searching for the elixir of life. Local tradition attributes these visits to his quest for immortality and later place names on the island, although no Qin-era stone inscriptions from Zhifu Island have been archaeologically verified.

Today, there are places like Shihuang Avenue (始皇道 Shihuang Dao), and Fish-shooting Tower (射魚台 Sheyu Tai) named after the emperor. Having failed to discover the elixir, Qin Shihuang dispatched the court sorcerer Xu Fu from Yantai, to sail away and find the elixir of life with hundreds of men and women.

After performing a ceremony in the Yangzhu Temple, Emperor Wudi of the Han dynasty also left an inscription in 94 BC: "Arrived at Zhifu, which floats on Great Ocean. Mountains call out 'Ten thousand years!" (登芝罘，浮大海，山稱萬歲).

Now, the island is mainly a tourist attraction where clams and abalone can be fished here in abundance.

== Geography ==
Located in the Bohai Sea, the island is 4 km from downtown Zhifu and is 10 km x 1 km. Part of Public Road No. 26 connects the western end of the island and the north part of the mainland peninsula. Originally, the island was disconnected from the mainland, but for a period of millennium of years, the sand and soil in the ocean floor built up a 600-metre wide pathway. Thus the island is called the "Mainland-connecting Island" in Chinese (陸連島); it could even be considered a small peninsula.

The island's largest mountain is Laoye Mountain (老爺山 Lǎoyé Shān) at 294.1m. The Old Lady Stone (婆婆石 Pópó Shí) is on a cliff, at 43.49 metres above sea level, named because of its resemblance to a woman hugging the ocean waves. The southern part of the island is forested.
