= Longdu =

Longdu 隆都镇
- Town
- Location in Guangdong
- Coordinates: 23°34′27″N 116°43′49″E
- Country: People's Republic of China
- Province: Guangdong
- Prefecture-level city: Shantou
- District: Chenghai

Area
  - Total: 34 km^{2} (13 sq mi)

Population
  - Total: 74,000
  - Density: 2,200/km^{2} (5,600/sq mi)
- Time zone: UTC+8 (China Standard)
- Postal code: 515825
- Area code: 0754

Longdu (Chinese: 隆都; pinyin: Lóngdū) is a town of Chenghai District, in the northern suburbs of Shantou, in eastern Guangdong province, China. As of 2011, It has 1 residential community (社区) and 14 villages under its administration, and a hukou population of 74,000 living in an area of 34 km^{2} (13 sq mi).
