= China National Highway 325 =

Road in China

National Highway 325
- 325国道

Route information
- Length: 868 km (539 mi)

Major junctions
- From: Guangzhou, Guangdong
- To: Nanning, Guangxi

Location
- Country: China

Highway system
- National Trunk Highway System; Primary; Auxiliary
← G324	→ G326

China National Highway 325 (G325, Guangnan Highway) runs west from Guangzhou, Guangdong towards Nanning, Guangxi. It is 868 kilometres in length.

== Route and distance ==
Route and distance

City	Distance (km)
Guangzhou, Guangdong	0
Foshan, Guangdong	10
Heshan, Guangdong	47
Kaiping, Guangdong	103
Enping, Guangdong	162
Yangdong, Guangdong	207
Yangjiang, Guangdong	257
Yangxi, Guangdong	311
Dianbai, Guangdong	397
Wuchuan, Guangdong	435
Mazhang, Guangdong	505
Suixi, Guangdong	520
Hepu County, Guangxi	668
Nanning, Guangxi	868

== See also ==
- China National Highways
- AH1
