= China National Highway 328 =

Road in China

National Highway 328
- 328国道

Route information
- Length: 300 km (190 mi)

Major junctions
- From: Nanjing
- To: Hai'an in Jiangsu

Location
- Country: China

Highway system
- National Trunk Highway System; Primary; Auxiliary
← G327	→ G329

China National Highway 328 (G328) runs from Nanjing to Nantong in Jiangsu. It is 300 kilometres (190 mi) in length and runs east from Nanjing, going through Liuhe Town and Yangzhou.

== Route and distance ==
Route and distance

City	Distance
Nanjing, Jiangsu	0
Liuhe District, Jiangsu	44 km (27 mi)
Yizheng, Jiangsu	80 km (50 mi)
Yangzhou, Jiangsu	114 km (71 mi)
Jiangdu, Jiangsu	131 km (81 mi)
Taizhou, Jiangsu	167 km (104 mi)
Jiangyan, Jiangsu	190 km (120 mi)
Hai'an County, Jiangsu	224 km (139 mi)
Nantong, Jiangsu	300 km (190 mi)

== See also ==
- China National Highways
