= S80 Port of Taicang North Port Expressway =

Road in Jiangsu, China

Port of Taicang North Port Expressway

Route information
- Length: 15.411 km (9.576 mi)
- Existed: 8 October 2013–present

Major junctions
- West end: G15 near Shaxi, Taicang
- Jiangsu S338 near Jinlang, Taicang
- East end: Gangwai Avenue, Taicang Port Development Zone, Taicang

Location
- Country: China
- Province: Jiangsu

Highway system
- Transport in China
← S79	→ S81

The Port of Taicang North Port Expressway (Chinese: 太仓港北疏港高速公路), designated S80, is a 15.411-kilometre-long (9.576 mi) provincial expressway in the county-level city of Taicang, Jiangsu, China that connects the G15 Shenyang–Haikou Expressway, a major north–south expressway running through the city, with the Port of Taicang. It is one of two expressways that connect the port with the rest of the expressway network, the other one being the S81 Port of Taicang South Port Expressway. It opened on 8 October 2013.
