= Qiaodun =

Qiaodun 桥墩
- Town
- Location in Zhejiang
- Coordinates: 27°27′47″N 120°18′21″E
- Country: China
- Province: Zhejiang
- Prefecture: Wenzhou
- County: Cangnan

Qiaodun Town is a town under the jurisdiction of Cangnan County, Wenzhou City, Zhejiang Province, People's Republic of China. It is as the southern gate of Zhejiang.

== Administrative divisions ==
Qiaodun Town administers the following village-level administrative divisions:

- Tangyang Community
- Zhenxi Community
- Songshan Community
- Xiyuan Community
- Guilan Community
- Yushan Community
- Liuyang Village
- Gushu Village
- Jinshantou Village
- Xincun Village
- Saqi Village
- Yunxian Village
- Xiantang Village
- Xingong Village
- Mu'an Village
- Reservoir Village
- Longjing Village
- Fengling Village
- Shilong Village
- Nanhu Village
- Houlong Village
- Madu Village
- Huangtan Village
- Hengqiang Village
- Tianxing Village
- Jiaokeng Village
- Xiayang Village
- Jinbutou Village
- Gaoshan Village
- Wanyao Village
- Caiyang Village
- Guanmiao Village
- Shufeng Village
- Fafeng Village
- Xiaoyan Village
- Luoyang Village
- Fangzhu Village
- Simu Village
- Xiaoyuan Village
- Guannan Village
- Siju Village
- Bamuhou Village
- Nanshantou Village
- Liyang Village
- Shuigou Village
- Jiatong Village
- Xinfeng Village
- Zheyang Village
- Xinli Village
- Tengzhong Village
- Xingqing Village
- Chuanxing Village
- Yuteng Village
- Dongshan Village
- Cangbei Village
- County Forest Farm
- Qiaodun Tea Farm

== Traditional Chinese Village ==
In 2012, Wanyao Village was named the first batch of "Traditional Chinese Villages".

== Climate ==
The bridge pier has a pleasant climate, with an average annual temperature of 18 degrees and an average annual rainfall of 1700 mm.

== Tourism ==
A 12-kilometer walking trail in the Dashi Scenic Area of Yucangshan Yin National Forest Park was recently built under the "One Wall Plank Road in Southeast Asia". It is known as the "Back Garden of Cangnan County".
