= China National Highway 324 =

Road in China

National Highway 324
- 324国道

Route information
- Length: 2,712 km (1,685 mi)

Major junctions
- From: Fuzhou, Fujian
- To: Kunming, Yunnan

Location
- Country: China

Highway system
- National Trunk Highway System; Primary; Auxiliary
← G323	→ G325

China National Highway 324 (G324) runs west from Fuzhou, Fujian towards Guangdong Province, Guangxi Province, Guizhou Province, and ends in Kunming, Yunnan Province. It is 2,712 kilometres in length.

== Route and distance ==
Route and distance

City	Distance (km)
Fuzhou, Fujian	0
Hanjiang District, Fujian	93
Putian, Fujian	108
Hui'an, Fujian	167
Quanzhou, Fujian	196
Tong'an District, Fujian	264
Zhangzhou, Fujian	328
Zhangpu, Fujian	384
Yunxiao, Fujian	425
Zhao'an, Fujian	476
Raoping, Guangdong	498
Chenghai, Guangdong	537
Shantou, Guangdong	557
Chaoyang, Guangdong	575
Puning, Guangdong	623
Lufeng, Guangdong	701
Haifeng, Guangdong	733
Huidong, Guangdong	834
Huizhou, Guangdong	872
Boluo County, Guangdong	904
Zengcheng, Guangdong	962
Guangzhou, Guangdong	1028
Dali, Guangdong	1046
Sanshui, Guangdong	1073
Zhaoqing, Guangdong	1138
Yunfu, Guangdong	1201
Luoding, Guangdong	1284
Cenxi, Guangxi	1364
Rong County, Guangxi	1445
Beiliu, Guangxi	1473
Yulin, Guangxi	1502
Xingye, Guangxi	1536
Guigang, Guangxi	1595
Binyang, Guangxi	1690
Nanning, Guangxi	1777
Long'an, Guangxi	1875
Tiandong, Guangxi	1979
Tianyang, Guangxi	2009
Baise, Guangxi	2048
Tianlin, Guangxi	2122
Ceheng, Guizhou	2265
Anlong, Guizhou	2325
Xingyi, Guizhou	2404
Luoping, Yunnan	2492
Shizong County, Yunnan	2541
Shilin, Yunnan	2631
Yiliang, Yunnan	2663
Kunming, Yunnan	2712

== See also ==
- China National Highways
