= Hangzhou Bay Bridge =

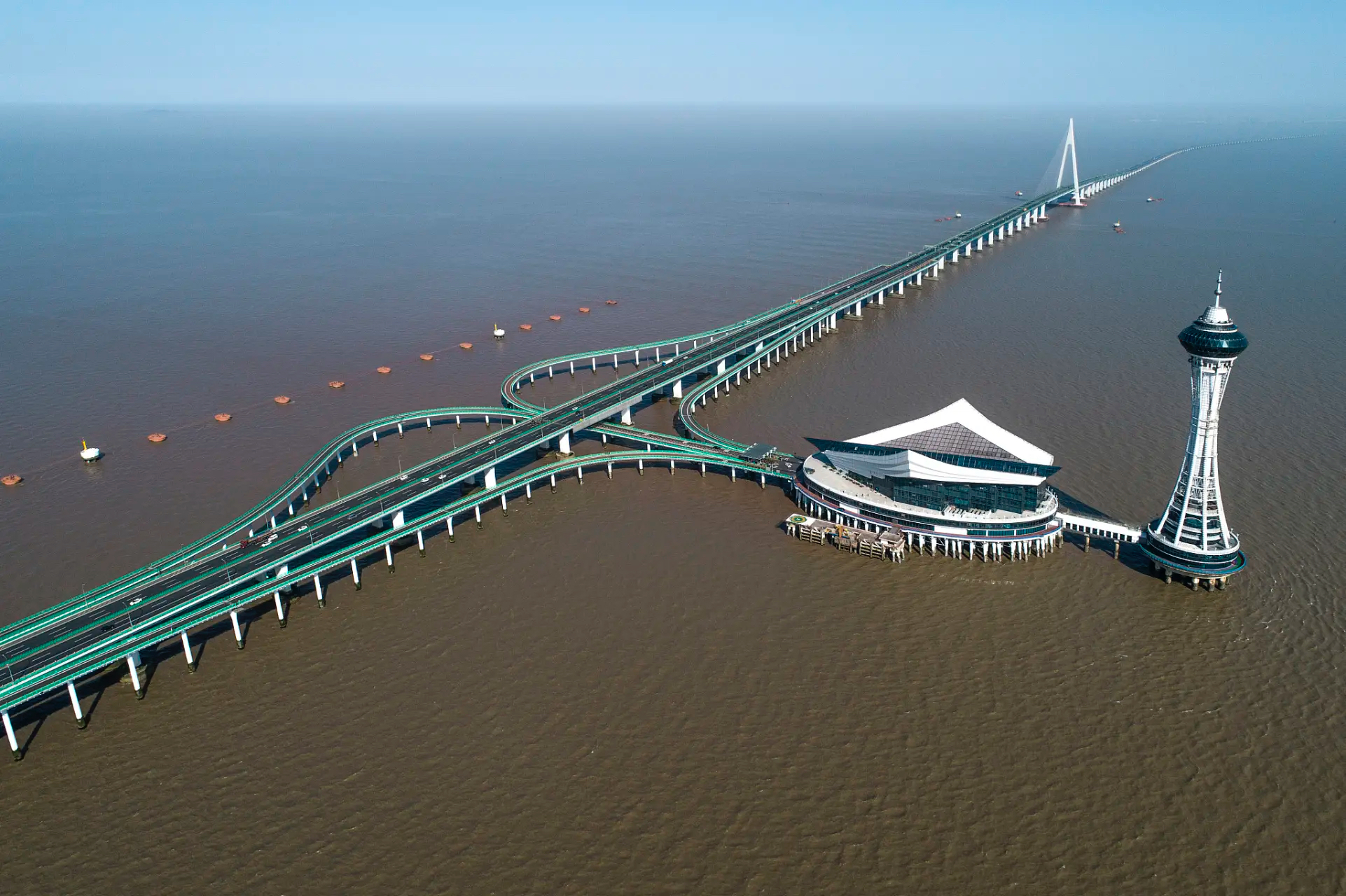
- Hangzhou Bay Bridge and its service area
- Coordinates: 30°27′N 121°08′E
- Carries: Six lanes of G15 Shenyang–Haikou Expressway and G92 Hangzhou Bay Ring Expressway
- Crosses: Hangzhou Bay
- Locale: Jiaxing / Cixi City China

Characteristics
- Design: Cable-stayed bridge
- Total length: 35.673 km (22 mi)
- Longest span: 448 m (1,470 ft)

History
- Construction start: June 8, 2003
- Construction end: June 14, 2007
- Opened: May 1, 2008

Statistics
- Toll: 80 yuan

Location
- Interactive map of Hangzhou Bay Bridge

Hangzhou Bay Bridge (simplified Chinese: 杭州湾大桥; traditional Chinese: 杭州灣大橋; pinyin: Hángzhōu Wān Dàqiáo; Wu: Han-tseu-uae du-jiau) is a long 35.7 km (22.2 mi) highway bridge with two separate cable-stayed portions, built across the mouth of Hangzhou Bay in the eastern coastal region of China. It connects the municipalities of Jiaxing and Ningbo in Zhejiang province.

Construction of the bridge was completed on June 14, 2007, and an opening ceremony was held on June 26, 2007. The bridge was opened to public May 1, 2008, after a considerable period of testing and evaluation. The bridge shortened the highway travel distance between Ningbo and Shanghai from 400 km (249 mi) to 180 km (112 mi) and reduced travel time from 4 to 2 hours. At 35.673 km (22 mi) in length, Hangzhou Bay Bridge was among the ten longest trans-oceanic bridges.

It is not to be confused with "Outer Hangzhou Bay Bridge", a project under study which would ring the bay islands between Shanghai and Ningbo. An official name does not yet exist, hence the terminology clash.

== History ==
The bridge across the Hangzhou Bay was the subject of various feasibility studies for over a decade before the final plans were approved in 2003. An earlier plan placed the bridge further east, closer to the mouth of the bay, which provided an even shorter travel distance between Ningbo and Shanghai. Under this plan, the bridge would begin in the north from Jinshan, a suburb of Shanghai. The government of Shanghai rejected the plan and focused on building the 32.5 km (20 mi)-long Donghai Bridge from Shanghai to its off-shore port at Yangshan in the mouth of the bay. The Shanghai government sought to feature Yangshan as the chief port on China's east coast and refused to allow a cross-bay bridge to be built on its territory, which would improve access to the Port of Ningbo at Beilun. The Zhejiang Provincial Government was forced to build the bridge further to the west on entirely Zhejiang territory. The Hangzhou Bay Bridge connects Cixi, a local-level city that is part of Ningbo Municipality, with Haiyan, a county in Jiaxing Municipality. The Hangzhou Bay Bridge has significantly shortened driving distance between Ningbo and the Yangtze River Delta region and improved the competitiveness of the Beilun Port.

== Structural description ==
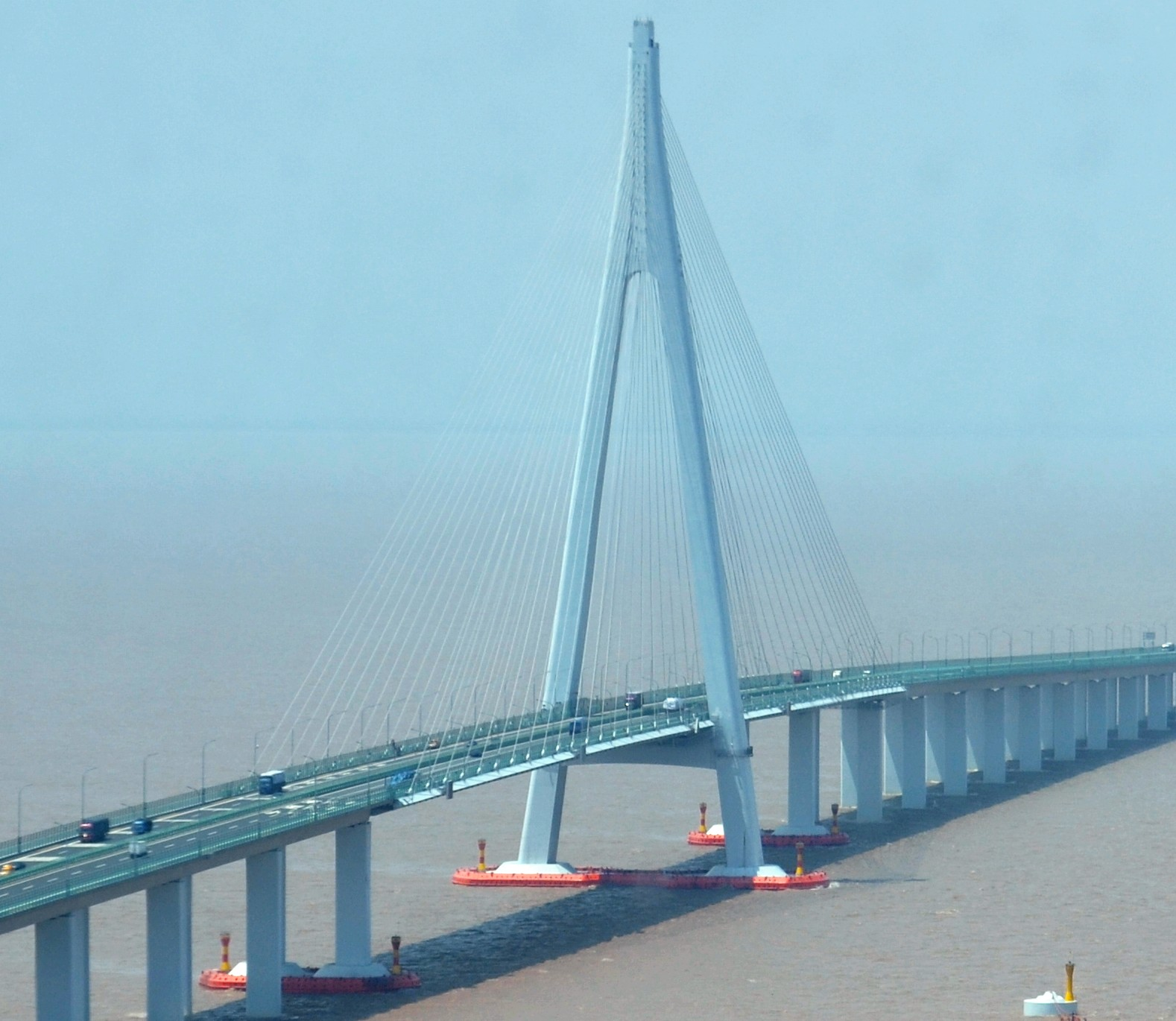
Hangzhou Bay Bridge (section)

The Hangzhou Bay Bridge is of the cable stayed bridge form. This form was chosen for this project because of the strength of the cable stayed bridge in adverse conditions. The bridge was constructed in the Qiantang River and Yangtze River Deltas and Hangzhou Bay, which all experience some of the highest tidal bore forces on the planet. The location of the bridge is also prone to earthquakes, as well as extremely high winds during typhoon season. The bridge form and construction material selections were based on strength against all the different forces the bridge would face.

Many bridges use concrete piles to support the deck but the Hangzhou Bay Bridge took a different approach and used steel piles. This choice was made based on the fact that the steel piles would be much stronger against corrosion from the extremely high tidal forces in the bay. Using the steel piles instead of the concrete piles also made the bridge far more constructible especially in the extremely difficult working conditions that they would be facing. It is not strange to see waves in the bay reaching 25 feet tall. In these conditions it would be almost impossible to construct the bridge without the use of some new construction technology and vehicles. During the construction of the bridge two massive cranes were used, one being 2,200 tons and the other being 3,000 tons. These heavy duty cranes were used to transport massive girders from the shore to the part of the bridge where they would then lift it and put it into place. The steel piles used were also transported using these cranes.

The load paths in this structure are somewhat easy to follow. The gravity load on the bridge as well as the rest of the loading on the deck such as cars are the easiest to follow which is further explained in the qualification as structural art section. The loads on the bridge due to the extreme tides are somewhat difficult to read, but they are clearly accounted for. The steel piles are the structural supports that resist the tidal loads. The piles are driven deep into the sea bed to reduce the movement on them. Having a small moment or force causing bending in the piles keeps the bridge upright. The steel is extremely strong against corrosion and are therefore the best material that could have been used in the piles.

When looking at the loading due to wind loads on the bridge the main portion that is important to analyze is the main spans. Because the two main spans are relative short the wind loading is insignificant. The wind loads however would be accounted for due to the outward bend of the towers that support the tension cables. This theory of widening the bottom of towers was first used by Gustav Eiffel when constructing the Eiffel Tower. The bent shape is very good at transferring the wind load to the base supports of the structure.

== Challenges ==
Because of the many difficulties facing such a tremendous build, almost 600 experts spent nearly a decade designing the bridge. Even after nearly a decade of design, studies, and planning, many different challenges were encountered, the first being the challenge of offshore construction. As a solution, several parts of the bridge had to be completed on land and then transported to the area for which they were built. Some components that were constructed using this process were piers, box girders (bridge panels), and even the bridge foundations.

Another construction challenge involved the weather in the region. Wang Yong, chief director of the Hangzhou Bay Trans-Oceanic Bridge Construction Command Post, described the bridge as being built "in the world's most complicated sea environment, with one of the three biggest tides on Earth, the effect of typhoons and the difficult content of the sea soil." Erosion of materials and cracking and bubbling of any concrete components became a large problem. To combat bubbling and eventual holes, engineers used a cloth-covered template over the concrete. This would improve the color and density of the pieces, making them both more aesthetically pleasing and sturdier. To reduce cracking, engineers used low-strength early-stretching technology when constructing box girders. This technology involves casting (molding) the girder, or bridge panel, letting it harden for no more than three days, and then squeezing it before it reaches its full density. This gives the girder more room to stretch after the bridge is constructed, preventing cracks in the concrete over time.

The third major challenge faced by designers and engineers was an area of toxic methane gas that was discovered roughly 50 meters underground below the location of the bridge. No drilling could be completed before the gas pressure was alleviated. To do this, steel pipes measuring 60 cm in diameter were inserted into the ground, slowly releasing the methane six months prior to drilling.

== Service Center ==
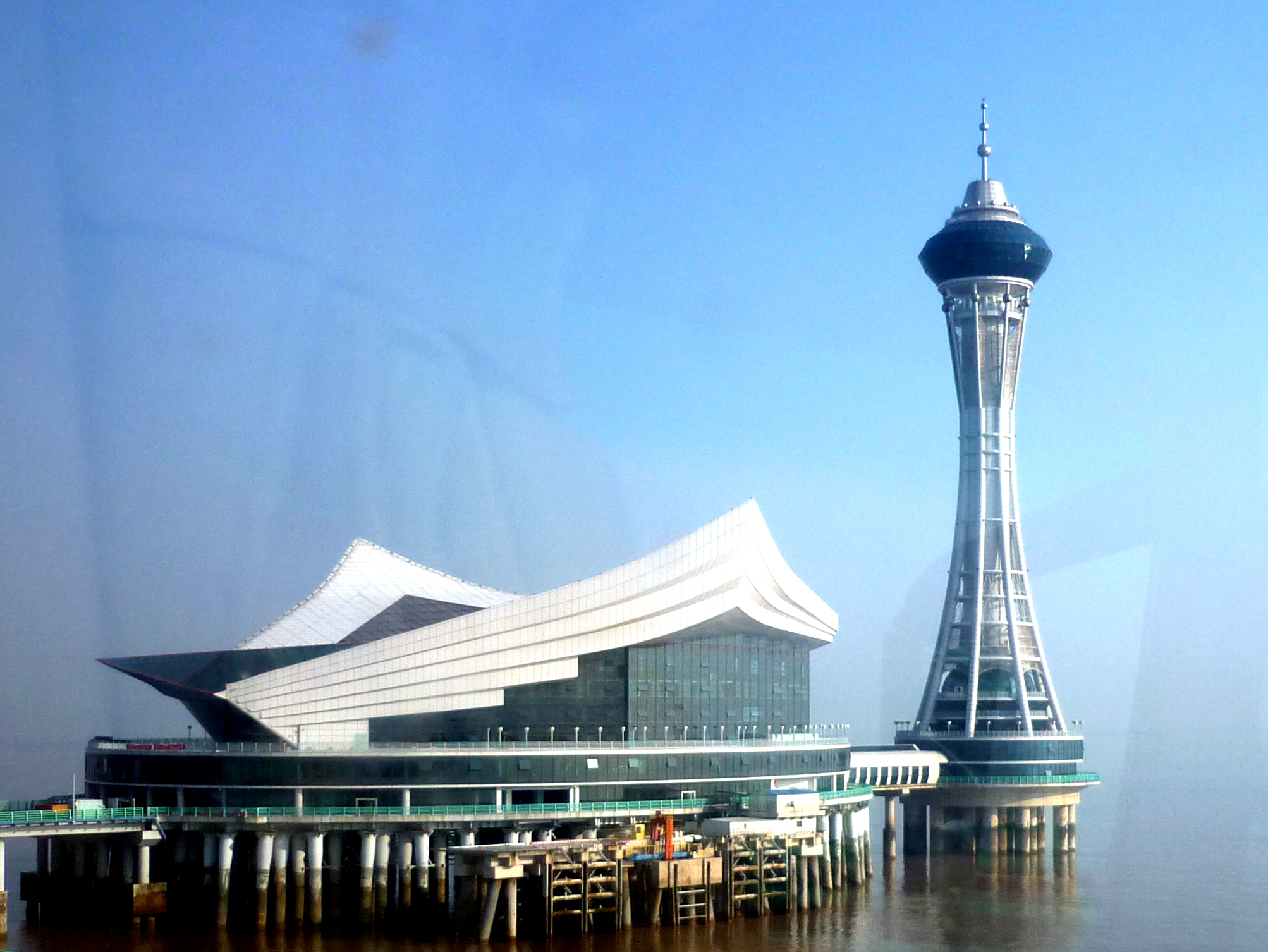
Service center with lookout tower at midpoint of Hangzhou Bay Bridge

A 10,000 m^{2} (110,000 sq ft) service centre called Land between the Sea and the Sky (Chinese: 海天一洲, Pinyin: hǎi-tiān yī-zhōu) is built in the middle of the bridge. This centre consists of shopping/exhibition/parking/restaurant facilities, a hotel and a 145.6 m-high (478 ft) lookout tower which serves as a tourist attraction from where to enjoy a bird's eye view of the bridge and the ocean. The service centre is built on an island, which is a platform resting on piers to avoid obstructing the sea current in the bay.

The service centre was slightly damaged in a fire on March 23, 2010, but opened to tourists on December 19, 2010.
