= Binhai County =

Binhai 滨海县 Pinhai
- County
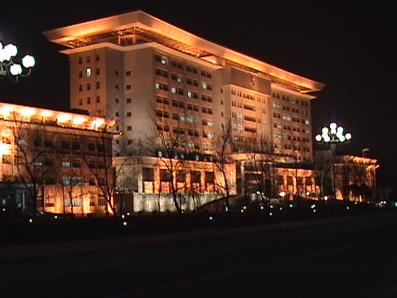
- Binhai County Government Building

- Location in Jiangsu
- Coordinates: 34°05′46″N 119°59′49″E
- Country: People's Republic of China
- Province: Jiangsu
- Prefecture-level city: Yancheng

Area
  - Total: 1,880 km^{2} (730 sq mi)

Population (2020 census)
  - Total: 820,084
  - Density: 436/km^{2} (1,130/sq mi)
- Time zone: UTC+8 (China Standard)
- Postal code: 224500

Binhai County (simplified Chinese: 滨海县; traditional Chinese: 濱海縣; pinyin: Bīnhǎi Xiàn; lit. 'marine') is a coastal county under the administration of Yancheng, Jiangsu province, China. In this county, the Yellow Sea coast turns from a north-northwest/south-southeast bearing to a northwest–southeast bearing. It is well known for its mouth-watering sausage. The sausage is made from pork seasoned with Sichuan peppercorns, star anise, cinnamon, angelica, ginger etc. and air dried for 3 to 4 days.

== Administration divisions ==
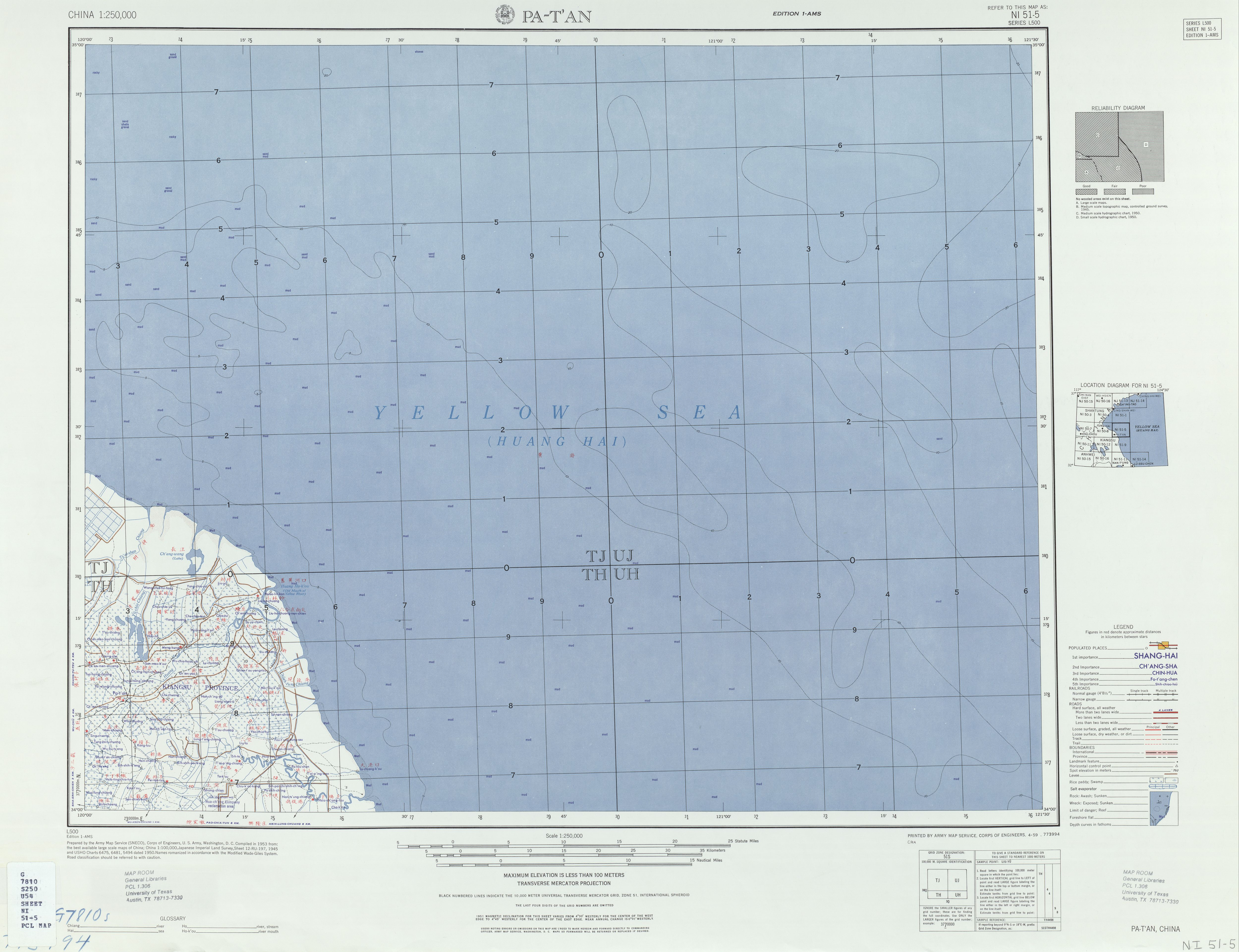
Batan (labelled as Pa-t'an 八滩) (1953)

Binhai County consists of 10 towns and 5 townships.

10 towns

- Dongkan (东坎镇)
- Batan (八滩镇)
- Caiqiao (蔡桥镇)
- Tongyu (通榆镇)
- Jiepai (界牌镇)
- Wuxun (五汛镇)
- Zhenghong (正红镇)
- Baju (八巨镇)
- Binhuai (滨淮镇)
- Binhaigang (滨海港镇)

5 townships

- Chentao (陈涛乡)
- Datao (大套乡)
- Zhendong (振东乡)
- Tianchang (天场乡)
- Fanji (樊集乡)

== Climate ==
Climate data for Binhai, elevation 4 m (13 ft), (1991–2020 normals, extremes 1981–present)
| Month | Jan | Feb | Mar | Apr | May | Jun | Jul | Aug | Sep | Oct | Nov | Dec | Year |
|---|---|---|---|---|---|---|---|---|---|---|---|---|---|
| Record high °C (°F) | 18.1 (64.6) | 25.0 (77.0) | 32.1 (89.8) | 32.3 (90.1) | 35.9 (96.6) | 36.8 (98.2) | 39.4 (102.9) | 36.6 (97.9) | 35.2 (95.4) | 30.9 (87.6) | 28.4 (83.1) | 20.0 (68.0) | 39.4 (102.9) |
| Mean daily maximum °C (°F) | 5.9 (42.6) | 8.4 (47.1) | 13.4 (56.1) | 19.7 (67.5) | 25.0 (77.0) | 28.6 (83.5) | 30.8 (87.4) | 30.3 (86.5) | 26.7 (80.1) | 21.9 (71.4) | 15.1 (59.2) | 8.3 (46.9) | 19.5 (67.1) |
| Daily mean °C (°F) | 1.3 (34.3) | 3.5 (38.3) | 8.0 (46.4) | 14.1 (57.4) | 19.6 (67.3) | 23.8 (74.8) | 27.0 (80.6) | 26.5 (79.7) | 22.3 (72.1) | 16.6 (61.9) | 10.1 (50.2) | 3.5 (38.3) | 14.7 (58.4) |
| Mean daily minimum °C (°F) | −2.2 (28.0) | −0.3 (31.5) | 3.7 (38.7) | 9.3 (48.7) | 14.9 (58.8) | 19.9 (67.8) | 24.0 (75.2) | 23.6 (74.5) | 18.7 (65.7) | 12.3 (54.1) | 6.0 (42.8) | −0.2 (31.6) | 10.8 (51.5) |
| Record low °C (°F) | −10.6 (12.9) | −15.0 (5.0) | −9.0 (15.8) | −1.1 (30.0) | 4.8 (40.6) | 11.8 (53.2) | 17.4 (63.3) | 15.4 (59.7) | 8.3 (46.9) | 0.2 (32.4) | −6.5 (20.3) | −12.4 (9.7) | −15.0 (5.0) |
| Average precipitation mm (inches) | 23.9 (0.94) | 27.7 (1.09) | 41.0 (1.61) | 45.5 (1.79) | 71.7 (2.82) | 116.9 (4.60) | 242.7 (9.56) | 202.3 (7.96) | 87.1 (3.43) | 38.8 (1.53) | 46.0 (1.81) | 24.7 (0.97) | 968.3 (38.11) |
| Average precipitation days (≥ 0.1 mm) | 5.5 | 6.1 | 7.1 | 6.9 | 9.0 | 8.6 | 13.5 | 12.5 | 8.1 | 6.1 | 6.5 | 5.1 | 95 |
| Average snowy days | 2.3 | 2.2 | 1.0 | 0 | 0 | 0 | 0 | 0 | 0 | 0 | 0.3 | 0.7 | 6.5 |
| Average relative humidity (%) | 72 | 71 | 69 | 69 | 72 | 75 | 82 | 84 | 80 | 75 | 73 | 71 | 74 |
| Mean monthly sunshine hours | 143.3 | 145.8 | 178.4 | 202.0 | 212.5 | 171.2 | 163.0 | 172.8 | 175.8 | 177.1 | 149.3 | 149.8 | 2,041 |
| Percentage possible sunshine | 45 | 47 | 48 | 51 | 49 | 40 | 37 | 42 | 48 | 51 | 48 | 49 | 46 |
Source: China Meteorological Administration all-time extreme temperature All-time September high
