= Yantai Economic and Technological Development Zone =

Economic development Zone in China

Coordinates: 37.5626°N 121.2719°E

Yantai Economic and Technological Development Area (YEDA) (Chinese: 烟台经济技术开发区) is an economic development zone established in 1984 in Shandong Province, China. It is near the Yellow Sea coast, and administratively under Yantai Prefecture. It covers 228 km^{2} and has a population of 400,000. Before its creation, most of the area were fishing villages. Now it is an industrial and famous tourist site in Shandong.

== Industry ==
YEDA is the largest producer of automotive parts in China (2006). Core industries at YEDA include industrial machinery, automobiles and parts, electronics, artificial fibers and textiles, and bio-pharmaceutics. A Foxconn plant nearby is a large source of employment in the district.

== Transportation ==
The Zone is connected by bus to Yantai and nearby Penglai. Most residents use Yantai's train station and airport to travel elsewhere.

== Tourism ==
Yantai Economic and Technological Development Zone's beach(金沙滩jinshatan) is a well known tourist destination in China.
