= Qixia, Shandong =

County-level city in Shandong, People's Republic of China

Qixia 栖霞市 Tsisia
- County-level city
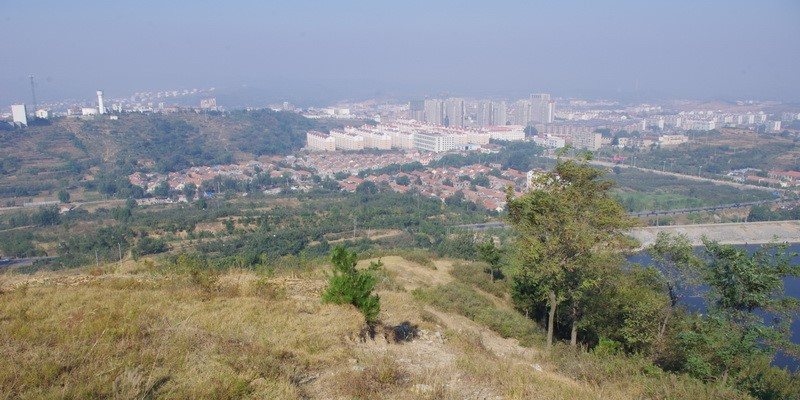
- Qixia Skyline

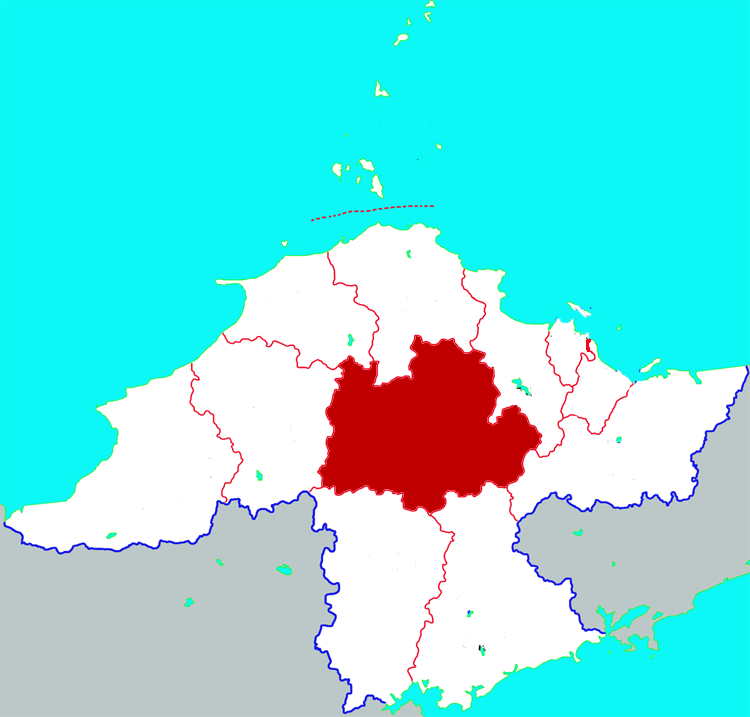
- Location in Yantai

- Location in Shandong
- Coordinates: 37.3056°N 120.829°E
- Country: People's Republic of China
- Province: Shandong
- Prefecture-level city: Yantai

Area
  - Total: 1,793 km^{2} (692 sq mi)

Population (2017)
  - Total: 622,000
- Time zone: UTC+8 (China Standard)
- Postal code: 265300
- Website: www.sdqixia.gov.cn

Qixia (simplified Chinese: 栖霞; traditional Chinese: 棲霞; pinyin: Qīxiá) is a landlocked county-level city of the Shandong Peninsula, and is under the administration of Yantai City, Shandong province.

The population was 664,510 in 1999. It borders Penglai to the north, Fushan District to the northeast, Muping District to the east, Haiyang and Laiyang to the south, Zhaoyuan to the west, and Longkou to the northwest.

== Administrative divisions ==
As of 2012, this city is divided to 3 subdistricts and 12 towns.

Subdistricts

- Cuizhan Subdistrict (翠屏街道)
- Zhuangyuan Subdistrict (庄园街道)
- Songshan Subdistrict (松山街道)

Towns

- Guanli (观里镇)
- Shewobo (蛇窝泊镇)
- Tangjiabo (唐家泊镇)
- Taocun (桃村镇)
- Tingkou (亭口镇)
- Sikou (寺口镇)
- Sujiadian (苏家店镇)
- Yangchu (杨础镇)
- Xicheng (西城镇)
- Guandao (官道镇)
- Miaohou (庙后镇)

== Climate ==
Climate data for Qixia, elevation 206 m (676 ft), (1991–2020 normals, extremes 1981–present)
Month	Jan	Feb	Mar	Apr	May	Jun	Jul	Aug	Sep	Oct	Nov	Dec	Year
Record high °C (°F)	13.3 (55.9)	19.5 (67.1)	26.4 (79.5)	32.3 (90.1)	35.9 (96.6)	40.2 (104.4)	36.6 (97.9)	37.8 (100.0)	35.9 (96.6)	30.6 (87.1)	24.3 (75.7)	16.5 (61.7)	40.2 (104.4)
Mean daily maximum °C (°F)	1.8 (35.2)	4.8 (40.6)	10.9 (51.6)	18.2 (64.8)	24.2 (75.6)	27.9 (82.2)	29.8 (85.6)	29.1 (84.4)	25.6 (78.1)	19.4 (66.9)	11.4 (52.5)	4.2 (39.6)	17.3 (63.1)
Daily mean °C (°F)	−2.5 (27.5)	−0.2 (31.6)	5.2 (41.4)	12.2 (54.0)	18.3 (64.9)	22.3 (72.1)	25.1 (77.2)	24.6 (76.3)	20.5 (68.9)	14.1 (57.4)	6.6 (43.9)	0.0 (32.0)	12.2 (53.9)
Mean daily minimum °C (°F)	−5.8 (21.6)	−3.9 (25.0)	0.8 (33.4)	7.3 (45.1)	13.2 (55.8)	17.8 (64.0)	21.6 (70.9)	21.3 (70.3)	16.3 (61.3)	9.8 (49.6)	2.9 (37.2)	−3.2 (26.2)	8.2 (46.7)
Record low °C (°F)	−16.1 (3.0)	−14.9 (5.2)	−9.6 (14.7)	−3.9 (25.0)	2.8 (37.0)	9.5 (49.1)	13.7 (56.7)	12.0 (53.6)	7.0 (44.6)	−2.1 (28.2)	−7.6 (18.3)	−11.5 (11.3)	−16.1 (3.0)
Average precipitation mm (inches)	7.3 (0.29)	11.8 (0.46)	16.4 (0.65)	31.3 (1.23)	52.7 (2.07)	76.5 (3.01)	182.1 (7.17)	169.2 (6.66)	49.6 (1.95)	28.1 (1.11)	26.9 (1.06)	12.8 (0.50)	664.7 (26.16)
Average precipitation days (≥ 0.1 mm)	4.0	3.8	3.5	5.3	7.3	8.2	11.3	11.4	6.2	5.5	4.9	6.1	77.5
Average snowy days	8.5	5.1	2.3	0.3	0	0	0	0	0	0.2	2.8	8.6	27.8
Average relative humidity (%)	66	60	54	53	58	68	79	81	73	67	67	67	66
Mean monthly sunshine hours	167.5	176.1	223.4	236.5	263.0	225.7	189.0	198.2	209.9	208.6	167.0	154.9	2,419.8
Percentage possible sunshine	54	57	60	60	60	51	43	48	57	61	55	52	55
Source: China Meteorological Administrationall-time extreme temperatureall-time August high
