= Sanmen County =

Sanmen 三门县
- County
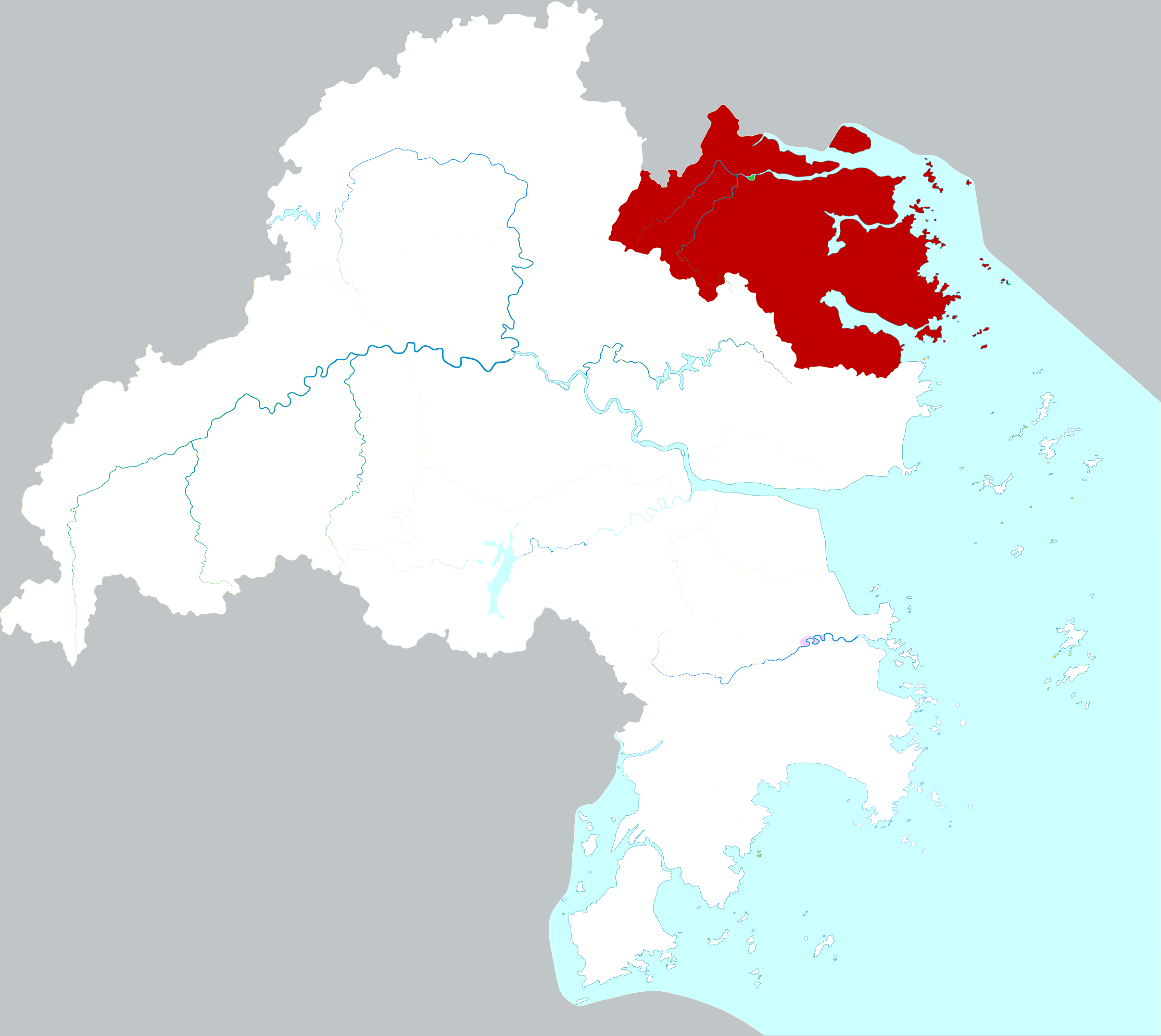
- Location of Sanmen County within Taizhou

- Location of the seat in Zhejiang
- Coordinates: 29°06′18″N 121°23′45″E
- Country: China
- Province: Zhejiang
- Prefecture-level city: Taizhou

Area
  - Total: 1,103.82 km^{2} (426.19 sq mi)
  - Land: 1,103.8 km^{2} (426.2 sq mi)
  - Water: 407 km^{2} (157 sq mi)

Population (2020)
  - Total: 379,500
  - Density: 343.8/km^{2} (890.5/sq mi)
- Time zone: UTC+8 (China Standard)

Sanmen County (Tai-chow dialect: Sæn-meng Yön; simplified Chinese: 三门县; traditional Chinese: 三門縣; pinyin: Sānmén Xiàn) is a coastal county under the jurisdiction of the prefecture-level city of Taizhou in the east of Zhejiang Province, China. The county's total area is 1,072 km^{2} (414 sq mi), and has a population of about 400,000 people. The county's postal code is 317100. The county government is located at 59 Renmin Road, in the town of Haiyou.

The Sanmen Nuclear Power Station, the first power station to implement an AP1000 pressurized water reactor (PWR), can be found here.

== History ==
During the late Qing dynasty, the Chinese forced the Italians to give up on a demand to hand over Sanmen Bay to them.

Italy demanded that the Chinese Empire grant it a lease for a naval coaling station at China's Sanmen Bay (known as "San-Mun Bay" to the Italians) similar to the lease the German Empire had secured in 1898 at Kiautschou Bay. From Sanmen Bay, Italy hoped to establish an area of influence in Zhejiang. The Russian Empire and the United States opposed the Italian demand, but the Italian ambassador in China, Renato De Martino, led Foreign Minister Felice Napoleone Canevaro to believe that the area was ripe for the taking. The British government, although ambivalent toward the Italian move, gave its approval as long as Italy did not use force against the Chinese, but the British did not inform Canevaro that the United Kingdom's representatives in China had advised that Italy could not achieve its goals without using force. Believing the opportunity to pursue Italy's interests in China was at hand, Canevaro had de Martino pass Italy's demands to the Chinese imperial government in the winter of 1899, but the Chinese summarily rejected them on 4 March 1899. On 8 March, Canevaro instructed De Martino to present the demands again as an ultimatum and authorized the armored cruiser Marco Polo and protected cruiser Elba to occupy the bay. When the British ambassador in Rome reminded him that the United Kingdom did not support an Italian use of force, Canevaro issued a counterorder cancelling his authorization to use the two cruisers in the bay, but De Martino received the counterorder before he received the original authorization to employ the ships. Unable to decipher the counterorder, De Martino presented the Italian ultimatum to China again on 10 March 1899, and China immediately refused to comply. Italy withdrew its ultimatum, becoming at the end of the 19th century the first and only Western power to fail to achieve its territorial goals in China. The fiasco was an embarrassment that gave Italy – still stung by its defeat at the hands of the Ethiopian Empire in the Battle of Adowa during the First Italo-Ethiopian War in 1896.

Since the Neolithic humans have been present in modern-day Sanmen County. Xia, suppliers, Zhou is Ouyue ground. Autumn belongs to the country, 306 BC, Chu eliminate Yue, the state of Chu. Qin, three under the central Fujian county. Han Hui Di three years (192 BC), three county Dongou country. Jianyuan six years, Three county to county. Emperor Han Zhao began yuan two years (85 BC), three belong answers riverside county to county. Eastern Han Guangwu period (25 AD), three genera County chapter. Three Dadi Dynasty (AD 222–252 years) Linhai County, three is a coastal county, belong to county. Wu Shaodi Taiping two years (AD 257), east to county Linhai County, three is a coastal county. Sui waste County for the state, county waste sea change into the State Department, three is a coastal county, Li Wu states. Emperor cause Dynasty (AD 605), and state for the county, three belong to Yongjia County. Tang Takenori first year (AD 618), Linhai County to the sea state, Takenori four years (AD 621) three Li Haizhou. Takenori five years (AD 622), changed the sea state Taizhou, Taizhou three genera. Taizong Zhenguan the first year (627 AD), Taizhou under the Jiangnan Circuit. Tang Tsung Qianyuan first year (785 years), said the resumption of Taizhou Linhai County, under the Zhejiang East Road. Song Ancestor Xining seven years (AD 1074), points to Liangzhe Liangzhe East, Liangzhe West, is a coastal division, Ninghai two counties, Li Taizhou. Yuan ancestor Yuan fourteen years (AD 1277), changed the way Taizhou Taizhou, eastern Zhejiang executive secretariat under the road. Local Administrative Region Ming Yuan attack system, change of Taizhou Road station state capital. Qing Ming inherited, located Jiaxing-Huzhou, Ningbo, Shaoxing, Jinhua and Quzhou strict temperature at four, three belong to the sea, Ninghai two counties, under the Zhejiang Ningbo, Shaoxing Road. Republic of China, three belong to the sea, Ninghai two counties. In twenty-nine years (AD 1940) set Sanmen County, Taizhou, under the Chief Inspector. February 17, 1949 liberation of three, is the first in Zhejiang Province liberation of the county, under the Taizhou. May 22, 1954 three counties under the jurisdiction of Ningbo. July 1957 Sanmen County, Taizhou recovery genus. May 1983, Ninghai County Salix communes classified Sanmen County. August 1994, the State Council approved, removed to build the city of Taizhou, under the Sanmen County, Taizhou City today.

== Administrative regions ==
Subdistricts:

- Haiyou Sub-District (海游街道), Shaliu Sub-District (沙柳街道)

Towns:

- Hengdu (横渡镇), Jiantiao (健跳镇), Tingpang (亭旁镇), Zhu'ao (珠岙镇), Huaqiao (花桥镇), Pubagang (浦坝港镇)

Townships:

- Shepan Township (蛇蟠乡)

== Geography ==
Sanmen County ocean located northeast, east, southeast on three sides, the total sea area of 481.7 square kilometers, accounting for 31.9% of the total area of Sanmen County, North Ninghai connected to the sea, east and Xiangshan County waters phase, South and Linhai sea phase adjacent. Coastal Mountains and more towards the direction of the coastline into a more perpendicular or oblique. Coastline of 167 kilometers, along the coast of the stream, Pearl River tour, pavilion next to the river, head Ao River, White River, Huaqiao Creek, Mountain Creek and other streams field into the sea.

=== Climate ===
Sanmen County has a subtropical monsoon climate, with long summers and dry, cold winters. Spring is short, with four distinct seasons that have abundant rainfall and is suitable for light, such as in southern Zhejiang. Zhejiang usually has humid summers while in the winter, it can get cold with slight humidity. Minimum monthly temperatures throughout the year, such as in January, tend to be on an average temperature of about 5.3 °C; the highest monthly temperature in July tends to be on an average temperature of about 27.9 °C; annual average temperature overall is usually 16.6 °C, with a frost-free period of 242 days. Seasonal distribution occurs throughout the year, through Spring and Autumn, with summer lasting more than four months, while winter usually lasts about two months.

By the maritime monsoon, which can have abundant rainfall, the average annual rainfall is about 1645.3 mm, a larger interannual variability of precipitation, which has an interannual difference of up to 1200 mm. Changes in annual precipitation has two rainy seasons and two relatively opposing dry season of bimodal distribution, from March to June being the first rainy season; July has a relatively light rain period; from August to September by the typhoon season, it has the second rainy season in October - the second in February for the second period is relative to small drizzles. Marsh water mountain precipitation is most abundant, with Sanmen County being the storm center, with the average annual precipitation being about 1700 mm. The average annual sunshine is usually 1863.7 hours.

Climate data for Sanmen, elevation 6 m (20 ft), (1991–2020 normals, extremes 1981–present)
Month	Jan	Feb	Mar	Apr	May	Jun	Jul	Aug	Sep	Oct	Nov	Dec	Year
Record high °C (°F)	25.4 (77.7)	30.1 (86.2)	33.3 (91.9)	35.2 (95.4)	35.8 (96.4)	38.8 (101.8)	43.1 (109.6)	38.9 (102.0)	37.7 (99.9)	35.2 (95.4)	30.7 (87.3)	27.5 (81.5)	43.1 (109.6)
Mean daily maximum °C (°F)	11.3 (52.3)	13.3 (55.9)	17.2 (63.0)	22.7 (72.9)	26.4 (79.5)	29.2 (84.6)	34.1 (93.4)	33.3 (91.9)	29.3 (84.7)	25.0 (77.0)	19.6 (67.3)	13.7 (56.7)	22.9 (73.3)
Daily mean °C (°F)	6.3 (43.3)	8.0 (46.4)	11.5 (52.7)	16.6 (61.9)	21.2 (70.2)	24.7 (76.5)	28.9 (84.0)	28.3 (82.9)	24.7 (76.5)	19.6 (67.3)	14.4 (57.9)	8.4 (47.1)	17.7 (63.9)
Mean daily minimum °C (°F)	3.0 (37.4)	4.5 (40.1)	7.6 (45.7)	12.3 (54.1)	17.4 (63.3)	21.6 (70.9)	24.9 (76.8)	24.8 (76.6)	21.4 (70.5)	15.9 (60.6)	10.9 (51.6)	4.8 (40.6)	14.1 (57.4)
Record low °C (°F)	−7.6 (18.3)	−5.5 (22.1)	−4.0 (24.8)	2.0 (35.6)	8.3 (46.9)	12.2 (54.0)	18.8 (65.8)	19.1 (66.4)	12.5 (54.5)	2.5 (36.5)	−2.5 (27.5)	−6.3 (20.7)	−7.6 (18.3)
Average precipitation mm (inches)	62.5 (2.46)	75.4 (2.97)	105.9 (4.17)	115.9 (4.56)	139.6 (5.50)	252.6 (9.94)	191.8 (7.55)	292.7 (11.52)	224.0 (8.82)	96.5 (3.80)	80.6 (3.17)	68.9 (2.71)	1,706.4 (67.17)
Average precipitation days (≥ 0.1 mm)	11.6	13.1	15.1	14.6	16.2	18.2	14.1	16.7	14.4	7.4	11.0	10.3	162.7
Average snowy days	2.2	1.4	0.3	0.1	0	0	0	0	0	0	0.1	0.8	4.9
Average relative humidity (%)	74	76	75	75	79	84	78	80	80	76	78	73	77
Mean monthly sunshine hours	98.2	95.3	125.2	140.1	131.7	101.2	207.2	182.9	132.7	151.7	109.1	113.9	1,589.2
Percentage possible sunshine	30	30	34	36	31	24	49	45	36	43	34	36	36
Source: China Meteorological Administration all-time extreme temperature all-time September Record High

== Cuisine ==
One particular piece of cuisine that could be found here is Sanmen crab, which is well known in China for its delicious taste.

The popularity of said crab has created a saying that is used in Sanmen for advertising the crab: "San men crabs, walking all over the world."

== Famous Sights ==
Sanmen has some famous sights, such as Shepan Island, Mushao beach, and Duobaojiang Temple.

== Language ==
The people of Sanmen speak Wu, a language native to the region.

== See also ==
- The Taizhou Museum displays a section about the customs and festivals of this city.
