= Qiantong =

Qiantong may refer to the following locations in China:

- Qiantong, Hebei (千童镇), town in Yanshan County
- Qiantong, Zhejiang (前童镇), town in Ninghai County
