= Zhang Zhaozhong =

Chinese admiral (born 1952)

- 张召忠
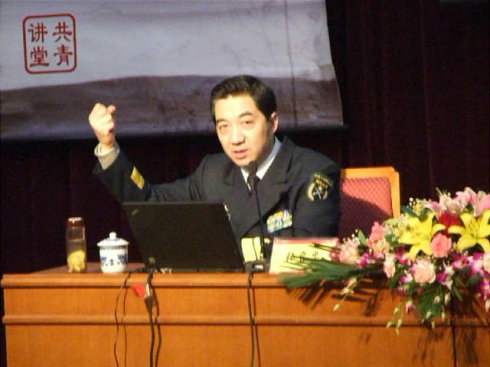
- Zhang Zhaozhong doing a speech at Beijing Institute of Technology in 2008
- Born: May 6, 1952 (age 74); Yanshan County, Hebei, China
- Military career
- Allegiance: China
- Branch: PLA Navy
- Service years: 1970-2015
- Rank: Rear admiral
- Commands: military theorist at the PLA National Defense University

Zhang Zhaozhong (Chinese: 张召忠; born May 6, 1952) is a retired Chinese military theorist at the PLA National Defense University. He held the rank of rear admiral in the People's Liberation Army Navy prior to his retirement.

== Earlier Life ==
Zhang was born in a small agricultural village in Yanshan County, Cangzhou, Hebei province. He grew up poor and attended trade school before enlisting in the People's Liberation Army Navy. Due to the Cultural Revolution, he was given the opportunity to attend university as a WPS student but was unable to pick his preferred profession as a missile engineer when he was enrolled, and was sent to major in Arabic language in Beijing University, which he graduated in 1978. He later was dispatched to the Middle East to work as an interpreter and observer during the Iran-Iraq War.

Zhang later also studied at the PLA National Defense University and Royal Military Academy Sandhurst during the late 1990s and early 2000s, and speaks English and some Japanese in addition to Arabic.

== Media career ==
Zhang first appeared as a media personality when he served as a guest analyst on China Central Television's Military World (军事天地) programme from 1991 to 2004. He later became an regular guest on CCTV-7's news analysis show Defense Review Weekly (防务新观察) in 2006, and was a frequent guest commentator on CCTV-4, Beijing TV and Phoenix TV.

Zhang became famous for his successful predictions about the progress of the Gulf War, but is better known for his wrong predictions during the CCTV live broadcast of the Iraq War, mainly due to his overestimation of Iraqi military's will to fight for the Saddam regime and failure to completely understand the American shock and awe strategy. He is also known for some of his dismissive comments to hide the real military strength of China. The best-known instance was his dramatical denial of the existence of the stealth fighter J-20 by exaggerating the American technological advantages, calling the J-20 prototype a "modified J-10".

In contrast, Zhang also sometimes expresses a low opinion of U.S. military-political will, with his 2012 assertion that the U.S. would "run like a rabbit" if China went to war with Japan over the Diaoyu Islands being an example. He also suggested that the PLAN might equip civilian fishing boats for suicide attacks against the United States Navy. Zhaozhong is also known for his other seemingly outrageous commentaries, for instance that smog is a good thing for China because it would obscure US laser weapon systems in the event of an attack, pigeon swarms can be used against F-22s, and that seaweed farms can be used as anti-submarine nets.

Due to his often playfully humorous but obviously inaccurate statements, seen by some as deliberate disinformation to misguide observers from China's true military advancement, Zhang has become an internet meme, which has led Chinese netizens to mockingly (and somewhat also reverently) refer to him as the "Chief of the Strategic Fool-You Agency" (战略忽悠局局长) or simply "Sir Chief" (局座). This ironically has gathered Zhang a cult following, where he gathered 880,000 new followers within the first day of establishing an account on Sina Weibo in 2016. The long-term costs and chaotic fallouts of the war on terror and Libyan crisis also vindicated some of Zhang's earlier failed predictions of the Americans getting bogged into a people's war. His consistently condescending mockeries of the Indian military, especially the 2012 comment regarding the INS Vikramaditya that he "hope it doesn't catch fire" just hours before the Indian aircraft carrier coincidentally had seven out of the eight boilers malfunctioning on its first sea trial, earned him the nicknames "the Mysterious Oriental Force" (神秘的东方力量) and "Causality Weapon" (因果律武器) among netizens, particularly on the backdrop of rising Sino-Indian border dispute since the Modi prime ministership.

Zhang retired from public appearances in 2020 and had since kept a low profile.
