= Xidian =

Xidian may refer to:

- Xidian, Zhejiang, a town in Ninghai County, Zhejiang, China
- Xidian University, a university in Xi'an, Shaanxi, China
