= History of science and technology in the People's Republic of China =

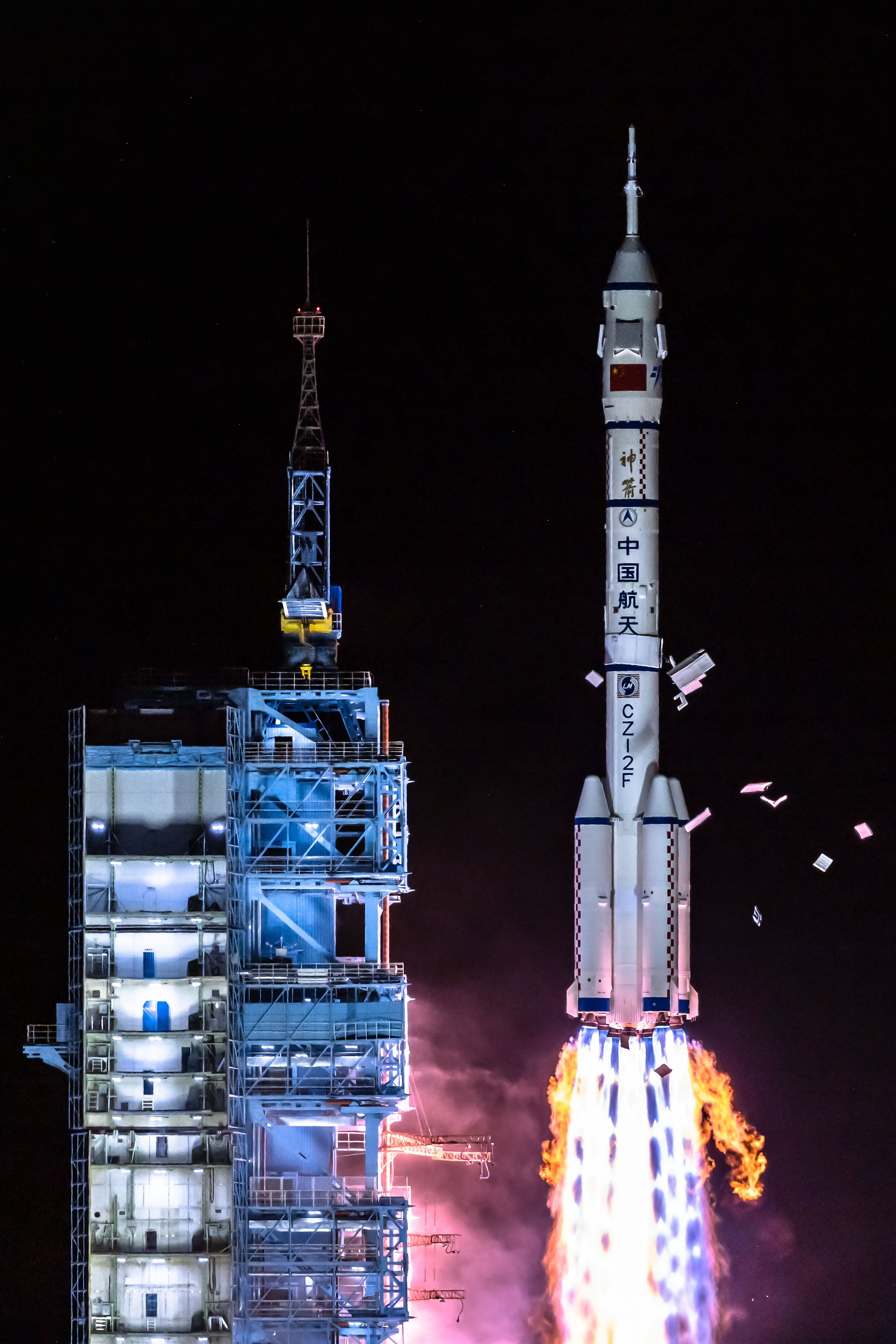
Shenzhou 13, a Chinese spaceflight to the Tiangong space station, launched on 16 October 2021

The evolving structure of science and technology and frequent reversals of policy under the People's Republic have combined to give Chinese science a distinctive character. The variation in quality and achievements stems in part from a large and poorly educated rural populace and the somewhat limited opportunities for secondary and higher education — conditions common to all developing countries. The character of Chinese science has also reflected the concentration of resources in a few key fields and institutions, some with military applications. In more politically radical periods — such as the Great Leap Forward (1958–60) and the Cultural Revolution (1966–76) — efforts were made to expand the ranks of scientists and technicians by sharply reducing education and certification standards.

== Historical development of science and technology policy ==
China's leaders have involved themselves in the formulation of science policy to a greater extent than have the leaders of most countries. Science policy also has played a significant part in the struggles between contending leaders, who often acted as patrons to different sectors of the scientific establishment. Chinese Communist Party (CCP) leaders, not themselves scientifically trained, have traditionally taken science and scientists quite seriously, seeing them as keys to economic development and national strength. Government efforts to direct science to further the economy and generate military payoffs, however, have historically been met with repeated frustrations. The frustration in turn contributed to frequent reversals of policy and had exacerbated the inherent tension between the scientific and political elites over the goals and control of the nation's science and technology. In any economic system there are likely to be tensions and divergences of interest between managers and scientists, but in China such tensions had been extreme and had led to repeated episodes of persecution of scientists and intellectuals. Science in China had been marked by uneven development, wide variation in quality of work, high level of involvement with politics, and high degree of policy discontinuity.

In the post-Mao Zedong era, the anti-intellectual policies of the Cultural Revolution were reversed, and such top leaders as Deng Xiaoping encouraged the development of science. But China's leaders in the 1980s remained, like their predecessors over the past 100 years, interested in science primarily as a means for national strength and economic growth. The policy makers' goal was the creation of a vigorous scientific and technical establishment that operated at the level of developed countries while contributing in a fairly direct way to agriculture, industry, and defense. Since the early 1980s, major efforts to reform the scientific and technical system through a range of systemic and institutional changes were initiated in order to promote the application of scientific knowledge to the economy. As in the past 100 years, policy makers and scientists have grappled with such issues as the proportion of basic to applied research, the priorities of various fields of research, the limits of professional and academic freedom, and the best mechanisms for promoting industrial innovation and widespread assimilation of up-to-date technology.

=== Pre-1949 patterns ===
In the context of China's high yield agriculture (hence surpluses in the economy which were translated into leisure time for other pursuits) and Confucian [meritocracy] (hence a continued over-supply of the literate vis-à-vis the openings in officialdom and persistent record keeping by the premodern standards), China became one of the hotbeds of scientific discoveries and technological development of the premodern world. It is commonly agreed that China led the world in science and technology from about the tenth century to about the fifteenth century. The Chinese sciences and technologies were concentrated in several fields, mainly material production, transport, weaponry and medicine. A common feature of all Chinese discoveries was their trial-and-error basis and incremental improvement. Here, China's continued history and large population became an advantage. However, this trial-and-error approach had its developmental ceiling. And, incremental improvement faced diminishing returns. So, although China once led the world in scientific progress, it was unable to realize its own version of the 16th-century European "Scientific Revolution," despite that movement having documented roots in China.

In the first two decades of the twentieth century an increasing number of colleges and universities were founded, and growing numbers of Chinese students were educated abroad. The Science Society of China, whose membership included most of the country's leading scientists and engineers, was founded by Chinese students at Cornell University in 1914. In 1915 it began publication in China of a major journal, Kexue (Science), which was patterned on the journal of the American Association for the Advancement of Science. In 1922 the Society established a major biological research laboratory in Nanjing. The Society devoted itself to the popularization of science through an active and diverse publication program, the improvement of science education, and participation in international scientific meetings.

Participants in the May Fourth Movement of 1919 advocated that science (nicknamed, "Mr. Science"), along with Democracy ("Mr. Democracy") could save China. Belief in the idea of "saving China through science" (kexue jiuguo) increased during the ROC period. Founded in 1921, the Chinese Communist Party reflected the May Fourth Movement's high regard for science, as many of its early leaders (including Chen Duxiu, its first general secretary) had been active in the movement.

The establishment of the Nationalist government at Nanjing in 1927 was followed by the creation of several government research and training institutions (see Republican China). The Academia Sinica, founded in 1928, had a dozen research institutes, whose personnel did research and advised the government. The late 1920s and early 1930s saw the establishment of many research institutes, such as the Fan Memorial Biological Institute in Beijing and the Beijing Research Laboratory, which eventually formed departments in physics, biology, pharmacology, and other fields. Most of the research institutes were characterized both by very limited funds and personnel and by productive, high-quality scientific work. By the 1930s China possessed a number of foreign-trained scientists who did research of high quality, which they published in both Chinese and foreign scientific journals. These scientists worked in the major universities or in research institutes funded by the government or foreign organizations (such as the Rockefeller Foundation) and were concentrated in Beijing, Nanjing, and Shanghai.

Mao Zedong viewed science as a liberating force, characterizing it as a "weapon in [humanity's] fight for freedom." His seminal essay On Practice defined "social practice" as "material production, class struggle, or scientific experiment."

In the Yan'an era, the CCP further embraced science as part of its drive for self-sufficiency and local industrialization to overcome economic blockade from the Nationalists. In 1939, the CCP Central Committee established a scientific research institute in Yan'an, which became the Yan'an Academy of Natural Sciences in 1940. In 1940, the Natural Science Research Society was founded in Yan'an; CCP leadership emphasized its importance, stating that "economic work and technical work are an indispensable part of revolutionary work."

=== 1950s: Soviet influence ===
After the establishment of the People's Republic in 1949, China reorganized its science establishment along Soviet lines. The Soviet approach to science and technology was highly centralized, with the Academy of Sciences if the Soviet Union and several industrial ministries, and emphasized applied science (which could be more readily applied to economic production) more than basic science.

Zhou Enlai was a major figure in developing science and technology policy in the early PRC.

The government's view of the purpose of scientific work was set forth in the September 1949 Common Program of the Chinese People's Political Consultative Conference, which stated, "Efforts should be made to develop the natural sciences in order to serve the construction of industry, agriculture, and the national defense." The Chinese Academy of Sciences was founded in November 1949; it incorporated many scientists who had studied in Western countries or worked for institutions of the Kuomintang government (like the Academia Sinica or the Beiping Academy). In March 1951 the government directed the academy to determine the requirements of the production sector of the economy and to adjust scientific research to meet those requirements. Scientists were to engage in research with significant and fairly immediate benefits to society and to work as members of collectives rather than as individuals seeking personal fame and recognition.

The Chinese Academy of Sciences was explicitly modeled on the Soviet Academy of Sciences, whose director, Sergei I. Vavilov, was consulted on the proper way to reorganize Chinese science. His book Thirty Years of Soviet Science was translated into Chinese to serve as a guide. Soviet influence also was realized through large-scale personnel exchanges. During the 1950s China sent about 38,000 people to the Soviet Union for training and study. Most of these (28,000) were technicians from key industries, but the total cohort included 7,500 students and 2,500 college and university teachers and postgraduate scientists. The Soviet Union dispatched more than 10,000 experts to China. An estimated 850 of these worked in the scientific research sector, about 1,000 in education and public health, and the rest in heavy industry. In 1954 China and the Soviet Union set up the Joint Commission for Cooperation in Science and Technology, which met annually until 1963 and arranged cooperation on over 100 major scientific projects, including those in nuclear science. When the Chinese Academy of Sciences completed a draft twelve-year plan for scientific development in 1956, it was referred to the Soviet Academy of Sciences for review. In October 1957 a high-level delegation of Chinese scientists accompanied Mao Zedong to Moscow to negotiate an agreement for Soviet cooperation on 100 of the 582 research projects outlined in the twelve-year plan.

The Soviet aid program of the 1950s was intended to develop China's economy and to organize it along Soviet lines. As part of its First Five-Year Plan (1953–57), China was the recipient of the most comprehensive technology transfer in modern industrial history. The Soviet Union provided aid for 156 major industrial projects concentrated in mining, power generation, and heavy industry. Following the Soviet model of economic development, these were large-scale, capital-intensive projects. By the late 1950s, China had made substantial progress in such fields as electric power, steel production, basic chemicals, and machine tools, as well as in production of military equipment such as artillery, tanks, and jet aircraft. The purpose of the program was to increase China's production of such basic commodities as coal and steel and to teach Chinese workers to operate imported or duplicated Soviet factories. These goals were met and, as a side effect, Soviet standards for materials, engineering practice, and factory management were adopted. In a move whose full costs would not become apparent for twenty-five years, Chinese industry also adopted the Soviet separation of research from production.

The adoption of the Soviet model meant that the organization of Chinese science was based on bureaucratic rather than professional principles. Under the bureaucratic model, leadership was in the hands of non-scientists, who had assigned research tasks in accordance with a centrally determined plan. The administrators, not the scientists, controlled recruitment and personnel mobility. The primary rewards were administratively controlled salary increases, bonuses, and prizes. Individual scientists, seen as skilled workers and as employees of their institutions, were expected to work as components of collective units. Information was controlled, was expected to flow only through authorized channels, and was often considered proprietary or secret. Scientific achievements were regarded as the result primarily of "external" factors such as the overall economic and political structure of the society, the sheer numbers of personnel, and adequate levels of funding. Under professional principles, which predominated in Western countries, scientists regarded themselves as members of an international professional community that recruited and rewarded its members according to its own standards of professional excellence. The primary reward was recognition by professional peers, and scientists participated in an elaborate network of communication, which included published articles, grant proposals, conferences, and news of current and planned research carried by scientists who circulated from one research center to another.

Contemporary optics began in China when the Chinese Academy of Sciences (CAS) established an Instrument Centre in 1950; this later became the Institute of Fine Optics and Mechanics.

In 1954, the All-China Federation of Trade Unions began a nationwide technological innovation movement. Emphasizing workers' contributions to technology, it called for learning from the Soviet experience while "giving full play to the talents and wisdom of the laboring masses."

Throughout the 1950s, the PRC encouraged overseas Chinese scientists and students to return to China. Approximately 1,954 did so between 1949 and 1958, the majority of whom specialized in engineering or the natural sciences.

In the 1950s, programs encouraged young people to extend new agricultural technology and methods in rural China.

During the 1950s, the government funded an expansion of scientific and technical publishing. From 1949 to 1959, the number of such journals increased from 80 to 356.

=== Late 1950s to 1970s ===
From the 1950s until the end of the Mao era, China emphasized self-reliance in scientific and technological development. This resulted from its relative international isolation and its ideological stance. Drawing on the experience of the Yan'an era, Mao emphasized the development of "mass science". In 1963, Mao explained:

Class struggle, the struggle for production, and scientific experiment at the three greatest revolutionary movements for building a mighty socialist country. These movements are a sure guarantee that Communists will be free from bureaucracy and immune against revisionism and dogmatism, and will for ever remain invincible.

China began a formal computing development program in 1956 when it launched the Twelve-Year Science Plan and formed the Beijing Institute of Computing Technology under the Chinese Academy of Sciences (CAS). In 1958, China completed its first vacuum-tube computer. Over the next several years, Chinese researchers expanded on these efforts with extrapolation from Soviet models.

Following the Sino-Soviet split, China continued to develop domestic computing and electronic institutions, including the Beijing Institute of Electronics in 1963. In 1964, CAS debuted China's first self-developed large digital computer, the 119. The 119 was a core technology in facilitating China's first successful nuclear weapon test (Project 596), also in 1964.

Beginning in 1964, China through the Third Front construction built a self-sufficient industrial base in its hinterlands as a strategic reserve in the event of war with the Soviet Union or the United States. The Third Front construction was primarily carried out in secret, with the location for Third Front projects following the principle of “close to the mountains, dispersed, and hidden” (靠山, 分散, 隐蔽; kàoshān, fēnsàn, yǐnbì). From 1964 to 1974, China invested more than 40% of its industrial capacity in Third Front regions. After Nixon's China trip in 1972, investment to the Third Front region gradually declined. Rapprochement between the United States and China decreased the fear of invasion which motivated the Third Front construction. Through its distribution of infrastructure, industry, and human capital around the country, the Third Front created favorable conditions for subsequent market development and private enterprise.

In 1966, China transitioned from vacuum-tube computers to fully transistorized computers. In the mid-1960s through the late 1960s, China began a semiconductor program and was producing third-generation computers by 1972.

Military science continued to develop during the Cultural Revolution period, with China conducting its first hydrogen bomb test in 1967, testing its long-range DF-4 missile in 1970, and testing its intercontinental DF-5 missile in 1971.

China launched its first satellite in 1970.

==== Trends ====
Particularly during the Great Leap Forward and the Cultural Revolution, scientists worked at local production sites like factories and villages in disciplines including cybernetics, mathematics, and data science. This was part of an effort to assist political mobilization through technology and sought to unite high-level scientific projects and mass line politics. Other Great Leap Forward efforts to incorporate the knowledge of the masses into scientific approaches included mass meteorology campaigns which used folk knowledge to improve weather forecasting. Such efforts were promoted under the slogan tuyang jiehe 土洋結合 (i.e., combining native/practical know-how with foreign/specialized expertise).

The terminology of the Mao period distinguished between "red" and "expert". Although CCP leaders spoke of the need to combine "redness" with expertise, they more often acted as if political rectitude and professional skill were mutually exclusive qualities. The period of the Great Leap Forward (1958–60) saw efforts to reassign scientists to immediately useful projects, to involve the uneducated masses in such research work as plant breeding or pest control, and to expand rapidly the ranks of scientific and technical personnel by lowering professional standards. The economic depression and famine following the Great Leap Forward, and the need to compensate for the sudden withdrawal of Soviet advisers and technical personnel in 1960, brought a renewed but short-lived emphasis on expertise and professional standards in the early 1960s.

Tensions between scientists and the communist government existed from the earliest days of the People's Republic and reached their height during the Cultural Revolution (1966–76). In the early 1950s, Chinese scientists, like other intellectuals, were subjected to regular indoctrination intended to replace bourgeois attitudes with those more suitable to the new society. Many attributes of the professional organization of science, such as its assumption of autonomy in choice of research topics, its internationalism, and its orientation toward professional peer groups rather than administrative authorities, were condemned as bourgeois. Those scientists who used the brief period of free expression in the Hundred Flowers Campaign of 1956–57 — to air complaints of excessive time taken from scientific work by political meetings and rallies or of the harmful effects of attempts by poorly educated CCP cadres to direct scientific work — were criticized for their "antiparty" stance, labeled as "rightists," and sometimes dismissed from administrative or academic positions.

During the decade between 1966 and 1976, China's leaders attempted to create a new structure for science and technology characterized by mass participation, concentration on immediate practical problems in agriculture and industry, and eradication of distinctions between scientists and workers. Ideologues saw research as an inherently political activity and interpreted all aspects of scientific work, from choice of topic to methods of investigation, as evidence of an underlying political line. According to this view, research served the interests of one social class or another and required the guidance of the CCP to ensure that it served the interest of the masses.

The "great revolutionary movement" of scientific experimentation was encouraged in rural China during the 1960s and 1970s. Millions of people in rural China, especially sent-down youth, participated in the scientific movement.

The scientific establishment was attacked during the Cultural Revolution, causing major damage to China's science and technology. Most scientific research ceased. In extreme cases, individual scientists were singled out as "counter-revolutionaries" and made the objects of public criticism and persecution, and the research work of whole institutes was brought to a halt for years on end. The entire staffs of research institutes commonly were dispatched to the countryside for months or years to learn political virtue by laboring with the poor and lower-middle peasants. Work in the military research units devoted to nuclear weapons and missiles presumably continued, although the secrecy surrounding strategic weapons research made it difficult to assess the impact of the Cultural Revolution in that sector.

In the most general sense, the Cultural Revolution represented the triumph of anti-intellectualism and the consistent, decade-long deprecation of scholarship, formal education, and all the qualities associated with professionalism in science. Intellectuals were assumed to be inherently counter-revolutionary, and it was asserted that their characteristic attitudes and practices were necessarily opposed to the interests of the masses. Universities were closed from the summer of 1966 through 1970, when they reopened for undergraduate training with very reduced enrollments and a heavy emphasis on political training and manual labor. Students were selected for political rectitude rather than academic talent. Primary and secondary schools were closed in 1966 and 1967, and when reopened were repeatedly disrupted by political struggle. All scientific journals ceased publication in 1966, and subscriptions to foreign journals lapsed or were canceled. For most of a decade China trained no new scientists or engineers and was cut off from foreign scientific developments.

The early 1970s were characterized by mass experimentation, in which large numbers of peasants were mobilized to collect data and encouraged to view themselves as doing scientific research. Typical projects included collecting information on new crop varieties, studying the effectiveness of locally produced insecticides, and making extensive geological surveys aimed at finding useful minerals or fossil fuels. Mao Zedong took a personal interest in earthquake prediction, which became a showcase of Cultural Revolution-style science. Geologists went to the countryside to collect folk wisdom on precursors of earthquakes, and networks of thousands of observers were established to monitor such signs as the level of water in wells or the unusual behavior of domestic animals. The emphasis in this activity, as in acupuncture anesthesia, was on immediate practical benefits, and little effort was made to integrate the phenomena observed into larger theoretical frameworks.

The effects of the extreme emphasis on short-term problems and the deprecation of theory were noted by Western scientists who visited China in the mid and late 1970s. For example, work in research institutes affiliated with the petrochemical industry was described as excessively characterized by trial and error. In one case, large numbers of substances were tried as catalysts or modifiers of the wax crystals in crude oil, and little attention was given to the underlying chemical properties of the catalytic or modifying agents.

=== 1977–84: Rehabilitation and rethinking ===
The Cultural Revolution's attacks on science and its deprecation of expertise were opposed by those within the government and CCP who were more concerned with economic development than with revolutionary purity. In the early 1970s, Premier Zhou Enlai and his associate Deng Xiaoping attempted to improve the working conditions of scientists and to promote research. At the January 1975 session of the Fourth National People's Congress, Zhou Enlai defined China's goal for the rest of the century as the Four Modernizations, that is, modernization of agriculture, industry, science and technology, and national defense.

Although the policies proposed in the speech had little immediate effect, they were to become the basic guide for the post-Mao period. In 1975, Deng Xiaoping, then vice chairman of the Chinese Communist Party, vice premier of the government, and Zhou Enlai's political heir, acted as patron and spokesman for China's scientists. Under Deng's direction, three major policy documents — on science and technology, industry, and foreign trade — were drafted. Intended to promote economic growth, they called for rehabilitating scientists and experts, reimposing strict academic standards in education, and importing foreign technology. The proposals for reversing most of the Cultural Revolution policies toward scientists and intellectuals were denounced by the ideologues and followers of the Gang of Four as "poisonous weeds." Zhou died in January 1976, and Deng was dismissed from all his posts in April. Deng's stress on the priority of scientific and technical development was condemned by the radicals as "taking the capitalist road." This dispute demonstrated the central place of science policy in modern Chinese politics and the link between science policies and the political fortunes of individual leaders.

Some of the immediate consequences of Mao's death and the subsequent overthrow of the Gang of Four in October 1976 were the reversals of science and education policies. During 1977 the more vocal supporters of the Gang of Four were removed from positions of authority in research institutes and universities and replaced with professionally qualified scientists and intellectuals. Academic and research institutions that had been closed were reopened, and scientists were summoned back to their laboratories from manual labor in the countryside. Scientific journals resumed publication, often carrying reports of research completed before everything stopped in the summer of 1966. The media devoted much attention to the value of science and the admirable qualities of scientists. It denounced the repressive and anti-intellectual policies of the deposed Gang of Four, who were blamed for the failure of China's science and technology to match advanced international levels. The news media now characterized scientists and technicians as part of society's "productive forces" and as "workers" rather than as potential counterrevolutionaries or bourgeois experts divorced from the masses. Considerable publicity went to the admission or readmission of scientists to CCP membership.

Hua Guofeng sought to invigorate China's science and technology institutions, which the Cultural Revolution had disrupted. In March 1978, he convened a national science conference. The March 1978 National Science Conference in Beijing was a milestone in science policy. It was attended by many of China's top leaders, as well as by 6,000 scientists and science administrators. Its main purpose was to announce publicly the government and party policy of encouragement and support of science and technology. Science and technology were assigned a key role in China's "New Long March" toward the creation of a modern socialist society by the year 2000. Hua told the conference attendees that the most powerful base for modernizing science and technology in China was "the masses of the people in their hundreds of millions"; simultaneously, "we must also make vigorous efforts to expand our ranks of professional scientists and technicians ... it is necessary to raise the level of the professionals and train large numbers of scientists and technicians who are top notch by world standards."

In Deng's speech to speech to the National Science Conference in March 1978, he stated:

"The key to the Four Modernizations is the modernization of science and technology. Without modern science and technology, it is impossible to build modern agriculture, modern industry, or modern national defense."

Deng Xiaoping also stated that science was a productive force and that scientists were workers. In stated in his speech at the conference that "Mental workers who serve socialism are part of the working people." "A correct understanding of these two facts is essential to the rapid development of our scientific enterprises." These statements had a significant impact in lifting the class stigma associated with intellectuals since 1949. The idea that scientists should be both "red and expert" fell out of favor.

By 1978 substantial progress had been made toward restoring the science and technology establishment to its pre-Cultural Revolution state. Leaders with responsibility for science and technology joined senior scientists in looking ahead, framing plans for further development. The draft Eight-Year Plan for the Development of Science and Technology, discussed at the 1978 National Science Conference, called for a rapid increase in the number of research workers, for catching up to advanced international levels by the mid-1980s, and for substantial work in such fields as laser science, crewed space flight, and high-energy physics. For some scientists, and political sponsors as well, mastering technologies and developing Chinese capabilities in the most advanced areas of science were goals in themselves, regardless of the costs or of the likely benefits to the peasants and workers.

Both political leaders and media personnel seemed captivated by the vision of rapid economic growth and social transformation made possible by the wonders of science. Further, many leaders, not themselves scientifically trained, tended toward unrealistic expectations of the immediate benefits from research. This attitude, while different from the hostility to science exhibited during the Cultural Revolution, was based on a misunderstanding of the nature of scientific work and was therefore a poor foundation for science policy.

The plans for rapid advance in many scientific areas were associated with equally ambitious calls for economic growth and the large-scale import of complete factories. During 1979 it became increasingly clear that China could not pay for all the imports or scientific projects wanted by all the ministries, regional authorities, and research institutes. It also became increasingly evident that those promoting the projects had overlooked financial constraints and severe shortages of scientific and technical manpower and that they lacked a comprehensive plan. In February 1981 a report of the State Science and Technology Commission reversed the overly ambitious 1978 eight-year scientific development plan and called for renewed emphasis on the application of science to practical problems and on training more scientists and engineers.

As scientists and administrators confronted the problems of applying and linking research with development, they became aware of the constraints of the existing system and of the extent to which the endemic difficulties in applying scientific knowledge were consequences of the Soviet-style structure for science and industry that China had uncritically adopted in the 1950s. Attention shifted to reforming the existing system and promoting greater efficiency and better use of scarce resources, such as trained manpower. Between 1981 and 1985, a number of new journals discussed China's scientific system and suggested improvements, while national and local administrators sponsored a wide range of experimental reforms and reorganizations of research bodies. The extensive discussion and experimentation culminated in a March 1985 decision of the CCP Central Committee calling for thorough reform of China's science system.

== Science and technology in the 1980s ==
As General Secretary, Hu Yaobang praised China's scientists and stated that they would have the Communist Party's full support. Hu supported state-led science and technology; in his view, "large-scale technological transformation must be promoted in a planned way."

As Premier, Zhao Ziyang had a substantial role in developing China's science and technology policies in the 1980s. His first major address as highlighted policy and science as the major drivers of China's development.

=== Supply of skilled manpower ===
Research and development (R&D) is a labor-intensive endeavor, in which the critical resource is the size and quality of the pool of trained manpower. China suffered both from an absolute shortage of scientists, engineers, and technicians and from maldistribution and misuse of those it had. Chinese statistics on the number and distribution of scientific personnel were neither complete nor consistent. According to the State Statistical Bureau, at the end of 1986 there were some 8.2 million personnel (out of 127.7 million workers) in the natural sciences working in state-owned enterprises, research institutes, and government offices. These numbers probably excluded military personnel and scientists in military research bodies, but they included support personnel in research institutes. "Scientific and technical personnel" comprised about 1.5 percent of all employed persons, but only about 350,000 of them were "research personnel." Their number had increased markedly from the 1970s as well-trained students began graduating from Chinese colleges and universities in substantial numbers and as postgraduates began returning from advanced training in foreign countries. Between 1979 and 1986, China sent over 35,000 students abroad, 23,000 of whom went to the United States.

More significant than sheer numbers of scientific personnel were their quality and distribution. The total numbers masked wide variations in educational background and quality, lumping together graduates of two-year institutions or those who had attended secondary or post secondary schools during periods of low standards with those who had graduated from major institutions in the early 1960s or the 1980s, that is, before or after the period of the Cultural Revolution. The Cultural Revolution had removed an entire generation from access to university and professional training, creating a gap in the age distribution of the scientific work force. The scientific community included a small number of elderly senior scientists, often trained abroad before 1949, a relatively small group of middle-aged personnel, and a large number of junior scientists who had graduated from Chinese universities after 1980 or returned from study abroad. In the mid-1980s many of the middle-aged, middle-rank scientists had low educational and professional attainments, but generally they could be neither dismissed nor retired (because of China's practice of secure lifetime employment); nor could they be retrained, as colleges and universities allocated scarce places to younger people with much better qualifications. Scientists and engineers were concentrated in specialized research institutes, in heavy industry, and in the state's military research and military industrial facilities, which had the highest standards and the best-trained people. A very small proportion of scientists and engineers worked in light industry, consumer industry, small-scale collective enterprises, and small towns and rural areas.

=== Research institutes ===
In the late 1980s, most Chinese researchers worked in specialized research institutes rather than in academic or industrial enterprises. The research institutes, of which there were about 10,000 in 1985, were, like their Soviet exemplars, directed and funded by various central and regional government bodies. Their research tasks were, in theory, assigned by higher administrative levels as part of an overall research plan; the research plan was, in theory, coordinated with an overall economic plan. Research institutes were the basic units for the conduct of research and the employment of scientists, who were assigned to institutes by government personnel bureaus. Scientists usually spent their entire working careers within the same institute. Research institutes functioned as ordinary Chinese work units, with the usual features of lifetime employment, unit control of rewards and scarce goods, and limited contact with other units not in the same chain of command. Each research institute attempted to provide its own staff housing, transportation, laboratory space, and instruments and to stockpile equipment and personnel. The limited channels for exchanges of information with other institutes often led to duplication or repetition of research.

=== National organization and administration ===
The research institutes belonged to larger systems or hierarchies, defined by the administrative bodies that directed and funded their subordinate institutes. Research institutes were grouped into five major subsystems, known in China as the "five main forces" (Chinese Academy of Sciences, institutions of higher learning, industrial branches, national defense departments, and local scientific research institutes) The five subsystems were administratively distinct and had little contact or communication among them.

In December 1982, the Science and Technology Leading Small Group was established with Zhao Ziyang as its head. This body was tasked with "unified leadership over economic planning, research and development, and scientific and technical manpower training and allocation." In late 1983 and 1984, Science and Technology Leading Groups were established at the provincial level.

China began to develop its national laboratories in 1983, with the first being the National Synchrotron Radiation Laboratory at China University of Science and Technology in Hefei. National laboratories were intended to be flagship facilities with the newest technology.

In 1984, China began its state key laboratory program. These laboratories were an instrument for focusing investment and raising the level of basic research in China at a time when resources were limited and distributed unevenly across the country.

In 1986, the National Natural Sciences Foundation of China was established.

==== Chinese Academy of Sciences ====
In the late 1980s, the Chinese Academy of Sciences remained the most prestigious research agency in the natural sciences. It administered about 120 research institutes in various parts of China, with major concentrations in Beijing and Shanghai. In 1986 the academy employed 80,000 persons, over 40,000 of whom were scientific personnel. It also operated the elite Chinese University of Science and Technology of China, located in Hefei, Anhui Province, as well as its own printing plant and scientific instrument factory. Its institutes concentrated on basic research in many fields and did research (such as that on superconductor materials) that met international standards. The Chinese Academy of Sciences institutes employed China's best-qualified civilian scientists and had better laboratories, equipment, and libraries than institutes in the other four research systems. The academy's concentration on basic research was intended to be complemented by the work of the more numerous institutes affiliated with industrial ministries or local governments, which focused on applied research.

Although nominally subordinate to the State Science and Technology Commission, the Chinese Academy of Sciences in practice reported directly to the State Council. Before 1956 the academy was directly responsible for overall science planning, and in 1987 it retained a fairly high degree of institutional autonomy and influence on national science policy. The academy provided expert advice, when asked, to the State Council and its ministries, commissions, and agencies. Its specialized research institutes also did work for the military research and development program. Additionally, it had responsibility for interdisciplinary research, monitoring the level of technology in Chinese industries and suggesting areas where foreign technology should be purchased. During the 1980s the academy repeatedly was asked to pay more attention to the needs of production and the application of knowledge.

The membership of the Chinese Academy of Sciences included the nation's most senior and best-known scientists, some of whom had long-standing personal ties with senior political leaders. Such ties and the prestige of the academy helped it win favorable treatment in the state budgetary process and operate with relatively little outside interference. Its relatively privileged position generated resentment among those working in less well-funded institutes under the industrial ministries, whose workers — as well as some planners in the state administration — reportedly considered the academy both overfunded and overstaffed with theoreticians who contributed little to the national economy.

==== State Science and Technology Commission ====
The State Science and Technology Commission, a ministerial-level organ of the State Council, had responsibility for overseeing the work of civilian research institutes subordinate to the various industrial ministries, such as the Ministry of Electronics Industry and the Ministry of Coal Industry, or to provincial-level, prefectural, or municipal bureaus. More than 80 percent of China's 10,000 research institutes fell in this category, and their range of quality was considerable. Central planners and administrators considered the proliferation of low-quality research institutes a waste of scarce research funds, but by mid-1987 they had not been able to overrule powerful ministries or local governments. Such institutes, which employed the majority of China's scientists and engineers, were expected to devote themselves to the application of science and to useful innovations and improvements to industrial processes and products. They had little direct contact with factories and manufacturing, and they reported their research results up the chain of command of their department or ministry, which was responsible for passing them on to factories. The scientists and engineers had little opportunity for interchanges with research institutes that were doing similar work but that were subordinate to a different ministry or commission.

The State Science and Technology Commission also has primary responsibility for coordinating science policy with the State's planning and budgeting operations working in coordination with the State Planning Commission, the State Economic Commission, and the Ministry of Finance. The importance of science and science policy was indicated by the high state and party rank of the ministers and vice ministers placed in charge of the State Science and Technology Commission. Provincial-level units, responsible for budgeting, planning, and coordinating across administrative hierarchies, had their own science and technology commissions. The demarcation between the responsibilities of the Chinese Academy of Sciences and the State Science and Technology Commission in policy formulation and consultation was not entirely clear, and there was probably a certain degree of ambiguity and contention in their dealings with each other. The commission was apprised of the research being done at the academy institutes and approved the academy budget as a whole, but it could not direct the allocation of funds within the academy.

==== National Defense Science, Technology, and Industry Commission ====
Since the 1950s much of China's research and development effort has been channeled into military work. Military research facilities and factories are reported to have China's best-trained personnel, highest level of technology, and first priority for funding. Although the military sector has been shrouded in secrecy, its work evidently has resulted in the largely independent development of nuclear and thermonuclear weapons, intercontinental ballistic missiles, nuclear submarines and submarine-launched ballistic missiles, and the successful launch and recovery of communications and reconnaissance satellites. Little information on the military research sector has been made public, and secrecy has been reinforced by isolation of many military research centers in the remote deserts and mountains of China's western regions. The overall level of China's military technology is not high by international standards, and the achievements in nuclear weapons and missiles were apparently resulted from projects featuring concentrated resources, effective coordination of distinct specialties and industries, and firm leadership directed at the achievement of a single, well-defined goal. The style recalled the 1940s Manhattan Project in the United States, and the accomplishments demonstrated the effectiveness of the Soviet-style "big push" mode of organizing research and development.

The military sector was developed in comparative isolation from the civilian economy, and until the 1980s its higher level of skills made little contribution to the national economy. Throughout the 1980s efforts were made to break down some of the administrative barriers separating the military and civilian research and development systems. The military sector was relatively privileged, and the spirit of self-reliance was strong. Nevertheless, the rapid development of electronics and computer applications in the 1970s and 1980s rendered much of China's military industry obsolete. Consequently, pressure for more contact between the military research units and civilian institutes (which, with foreign contact and up-to-date foreign technology, surpassed the technical level of the military institutes) was generated.

In 1987 the work of the military research institutes continued to be directed by the State Council's National Defense Science, Technology, and Industry Commission (NDSTIC). The NDSTIC was created in 1982 with the merger of the National Defense Science and Technology Commission, National Defense Industries Office, and Office of the Science, Technology, and Armament Commission of the party Central Military Commission. The NDSTIC functioned in a manner similar to the State Science and Technology Commission, concentrating on high-level planning and coordination across the vertical chains of command in which military research institutes and factories were organized.

==== Research in colleges, universities, and enterprises ====
As a consequence of China's adopting the Soviet model for the organization of science and industry — featuring strict separation of research, production, and training — little research was done in Chinese universities. The State Education Commission had provided only limited funding to support research, and through the 1980s the scale of research at most colleges and universities was very modest. In the 1980s a few academic research institutes were established in such areas as computer science. The World Bank supported a major effort to increase research in Chinese universities and to better use the scarce skills of faculty members. On the whole, though, universities continued to play only a minor role in scientific research.

Research institutes associated with or organized as constituent parts of productive enterprises were quite rare and represented the smallest of the five systems of research institutes. Only the largest mines, oil fields, or factories, such as the Anshan iron and steel complex in Liaoning Province or the Yanshan petrochemical complex in Beijing, had their own research units, dedicated to solving immediate problems in production in the late 1980s. Enterprises concentrated on production, and their managers had little incentive to take the risks associated with innovation.

==== Planning scientific research ====
Since 1949 China has attempted, with mixed success, to organize research and development according to a centralized national plan. The various plans for scientific development that China has adopted since 1957 have been broad — listing topics and areas of priority without going into much detail or attempting to issue targets or dates to specific research institutes. From the 1950s through the mid-1980s, the "iron rice bowl" of guaranteed employment and funding applied to research institutes and researchers as much as to any other enterprises or state-sector workers. No institute ever had its budget cut for failing to make a planned discovery, and no scientist was dismissed for failing to publish or to make progress in research.

Much of the initiative in research seems to have come from below, with institutes submitting proposals for projects and funding to the State Science and Technology Commission. The commission's plans were drawn up after conferences in which scientists and directors of institutes suggested work that seemed feasible and worthwhile. The Beijing headquarters of the commission had a staff of between 500 and 1,000, not all of whom had scientific or economic backgrounds. Some of their energies were devoted to communication and coordination with other elements of the central administration, such as the State Planning Commission and the State Economic Commission. The core of the responsibility and power of the State Science and Technology Commission was in its allocation of funds for research and approval of projects. It possessed neither the manpower nor the expertise to monitor the work of the several thousand research institutes it oversaw, and of necessity it concentrated on major projects and relied on the advice of expert scientists and the regional scientific and technological commissions, which processed reports and applications for new projects. Much of its work consisted of "balancing" the competing requests for limited funds, and its decisions often were made on grounds other than scientific merit. Although China's leaders addressed the rhetoric of centralized planning to scientific research, research activities were more decentralized and more subject to pressures from powerful ministries and provincial-level governments.

In March 1986, China launched the large-scale technology development plan, the 863 Project.

=== Integration of administrative systems ===
In the late 1980s, two of the five research subsystems — the Chinese Academy of Sciences and the military system — were relatively privileged in receiving government financing and being supplied with scarce resources and historically had tended to form closed, self-sufficient domains. The system under the State Science and Technology Commission, which included the largest number of research institutes, was marked by wide variations in quality and a vertical, bureaucratic mode of organization that inhibited collaboration and exchange of information. Both the universities and the research institutes attached to large industrial complexes were short of funds and out of the mainstream of research.

Overall, China's science and technology structure was marked by lopsided distribution of skilled manpower, pervasive fragmentation, compartmentalization, and duplication of research — an outcome of the 1950s decision to adopt a bureaucratic mode of organization for science and technology. Chinese policy makers were well aware of these problems and, over the years, had responded with two forms of organizational remedies: high-level coordinating bodies and mass scientific associations that cut across administrative boundaries.

==== Leading Group for Science and Technology ====
The growth of China's scientific system and the tendencies toward compartmentalization inherent in the Soviet mode of scientific and industrial organization, which it emulated, were matched by the creation of administrative bodies intended to coordinate the activities of vertically organized administrative hierarchies. Both the State Science and Technology Commission and the NDSTIC, which were formed by the amalgamation of earlier coordinating bodies founded as long ago as the mid-1950s, had this primary function.

Efforts to fill the need for progressively more authoritative and comprehensive coordination culminated in the establishment of the State Council's Leading Group for Science and Technology in January 1983. The leading group, a special-purpose task force formed by the State Council to address problems that cut across administrative boundaries, was China's highest-level policymaking organ for science and technology. In 1987 its chairman was Premier Zhao Ziyang, and its membership included Fang Yi, state councillor and former head of the State Science and Technology Commission and the Chinese Academy of Sciences, and leading members of the State Science and Technology Commission, NDSTIC, State Planning Commission, State Economic Commission, State Education Commission, Chinese Academy of Sciences, and Ministry of Labor and Personnel. That the leading group was headed by the premier indicated both the significance China's leaders attached to science policy and the level of authority necessary to settle disputes and encourage cooperation.

==== China Association of Science and Technology ====
At the lower end of the administrative hierarchy, communication and cooperation were intended to be promoted by professional organizations, whose membership cut across administrative boundaries. The primary organization was the China Association of Science and Technology, a non-government mass organization. Because it was funded by the government and, like all organizations in China, directed by party cadres, its autonomy had limits. The China Association of Science and Technology was an umbrella organization: in 1986 it comprised 139 national scientific societies organized by discipline and 1.9 million individual members. It succeeded earlier scientific associations that had been founded in 1910–20.

The China Association of Science and Technology served three major purposes. First, like professional associations in most countries, it brought individual scientists and administrators together with their professional peers from other bodies at conferences, lectures, and joint projects, and it promoted communication across administrative boundaries. Second, the China Association of Science and Technology had a major role in the popularization of science and dissemination of scientific knowledge to the general public. This latter function was accomplished through the publication of popular-science journals and books aimed at an audience with a high-school education and through lecture series, refresher training for technicians and engineers, and consultation for farmers and rural and small-scale industries. The China Association of Science and Technology and its constituent associations served increasingly as consultants to government officials. Third, the China Association of Science and Technology played a major role in China's international scientific exchanges and hosted delegations of foreign scientists, sponsored international scientific conferences in China, participated in many joint research projects with foreign associations and scientific bodies, and represented China in many international science societies.

=== International ties ===
Since emerging from the self-imposed isolation and self-reliance of the Cultural Revolution, China expanded its international scientific exchanges to an unprecedented degree. The 1980s policy of opening up to the outside world, a basic element of Deng Xiaoping's prescription for modernization, was nowhere better exemplified than in science and technology policy (see Four Modernizations). The goal was to help China's science and technology reach world-class standards as quickly as possible and to remedy the damage done by the Cultural Revolution. This was achieved by participating in international conferences, cooperating in projects with foreign scientists, and sending thousands of Chinese graduate students and senior researchers to foreign universities for training and joint research.

Scientific cooperation has come to play a significant part in China's foreign relations and diplomatic repertoire. Visits of Chinese leaders to foreign countries are often marked by the signing of an agreement for scientific cooperation. In mid-1987 China had diplomatic relations with 133 countries and formal, government-to-government agreements on scientific cooperation with 54 of them (see Foreign relations of the People's Republic of China). When diplomatic relations were established between China and the United States in January 1979, the Joint Commission in Scientific and Technological Cooperation was founded. Since then, the two governments have signed twenty-eight agreements on scientific and technical cooperation in fields ranging from earthquake prediction to industrial management. China has mutually beneficial scientific exchange programs with both technically advanced nations and those having only a minimal scientific capability. Although China tended to receive aid from more scientifically advanced nations and to render aid to the less developed, the equality implied in scientific exchange made it a useful diplomatic form.

In 1987 China had scientific-exchange relations with 106 countries — usually in the form of agreements between the China Association of Science and Technology and a foreign equivalent. Incomplete statistics indicated that by 1986 Chinese scientists had completed over 500 joint projects with scientists in the United States and were working on 1,500 projects with counterparts in various West European countries, 300 with those in Eastern Europe, and at least 30 with Japanese researchers. In June 1986 the Chinese Academy of Sciences signed an agreement with the Soviet Academy of Sciences for scientific cooperation in unspecified fields. Many exchanges with the United States involved Chinese-American scientists and engineers, who collaborated with visiting Chinese researchers in the United States and visited China to lecture on their specialties and to advise scientific bodies.

By 1986 the China Association of Science and Technology or its constituent associations were full members of 96 international scientific societies and committees, and over 300 Chinese scientists held office in international scientific bodies. China also was an active participant in United Nations scientific activities in the 1980s. Luoyang, Henan Province, is the site of the United Nations Educational, Scientific and Cultural Organization's International Silt Research and Training Center, which specialized in problems of river silts. Apart from the 35,000 students China sent abroad for training between 1979 and 1986, approximately 41,000 Chinese scientists took part in various international exchanges. Between 1980 and 1986, China hosted 155 international academic conferences, which were attended by 10,000 foreign scholars and 30,000 Chinese participants. China also has employed substantial numbers of foreign experts, often retired scientists or engineers, as short-term consultants — managed by the State Administration of Foreign Experts Affairs.

These international exchanges represent an aspect of the Chinese government's efforts to raise the level of science and demonstrate the strength of the centralized direction and funding possible under China's bureaucratic organization of science. Less successful efforts to improve the internal functioning and productivity of the domestic science and technology establishment and have generated a major effort to reform that establishment.

== Reform program ==
During era of reform and opening up, the state took a less active role in directing science and technology than in the Mao era, although Deng Xiaoping and other top leadership continued to emphasize the state's ability to "concentrate forces" on national priorities. Technological advancement was promoted under the motto of "Science is the Primary Productive Force."

Beginning in the 1990s, innovation became a focus of national policy-making.

=== Shortcomings of the science and technology system ===
From the perspective of China's leaders, the entire science and technology system of the late 1980s, with its 8 million personnel and 10,000 research institutes, represented an expensive, underutilized and not very productive capital investment. Dissatisfaction with the system had become pervasive by the early 1980s, and both scientists and political leaders agreed on the necessity for fundamental reform. The primary complaint of the leadership was that, despite thirty years of policy statements, central plans, and political campaigns directed at the attitudes of scientists and engineers, science still was not serving the needs of the economy. Reformist political leaders and senior scientists identified a number of organizational problems that were inherent in the system adopted from the Soviet Union and that had been compounded by Chinese work unit and lifetime job assignment practices.

In an October 1982 speech to the National Science Awards Conference, Premier Zhao Ziyang identified the following as primary problems: uneven development and lack of coordination among scientific fields; lack of communication between research and production units; duplication of research and facilities; rivalry among institutes, administrative bodies, and hierarchies; and maldistribution of personnel, with some units and fields overstaffed and others very short of skilled personnel. Zhao's speech drew upon and was followed by extensive discussions of management and organization by scientists and administrators. These discussions emphasized the prevalence of departmentalism, compartmentalism, and fragmentation of efforts. These problems, when combined with poor management, poorly educated managers, absence of incentives for good work or of penalties for poor performance, and absence of direct communication between research units and productive enterprises, resulted in the failure of the science and technology establishment to serve production and economic growth.

=== Program ===
The Chinese Academy of Sciences (CAS) was reformed and discontinued its Soviet-style management model.

In March 1985, after extensive discussion, consultation, and experimentation, the party Central Committee called for sweeping reforms of science management. The reforms proposed in the "Decision on the Reform of the Science and Technology Management System" represented a major break with past practices, and they assumed corresponding reforms in the nation's industrial and economic systems. By changing the method of funding research institutes, encouraging the commercialization of technology and the development of a technology market, and rewarding individual scientists, the reforms of the mid-1980s were meant to encourage the application of science to the needs of industry. It was envisaged that most research institutes would support themselves through consulting and contract work and would cooperate with factories through partnerships, mergers, joint ventures, or other appropriate and mutually agreeable means. The ultimate goal was to encourage exchange and cooperation and to break down the compartmentalization characterizing China's research and development structure.

The principal means for accomplishing the reforms was changing the funding system to force research institutes to establish contact with productive enterprises and to do work directly supporting those enterprises. Direct allocation of funds to research institutes was to be phased out and replaced by a system under which institutes sold their services in the marketplace. The distinctions among institutes subordinate to the Chinese Academy of Sciences, the industrial ministries, provincial-level governments, colleges and universities, and even the NDSTIC were to be minimized, and all were to compete and collaborate in a single market-oriented system. Institutes doing basic research were to compete for grants from a National Natural Science Foundation (which was subsequently established). The reforms were not intended as a budget-cutting measure, and total state funding for science and technology was to be increased.

A technology market and the commercialization of technology in the late 1980s were to be developed to encourage the transfer of technology and the transformation of research results into products and services. Direct centralized administration and supervision of research were to decline, and institutes were to be headed by younger, technically qualified directors, who were to be given broad powers to select their own research topics and to seek out partners for cooperation and consultation. Scientific personnel were to receive better pay and benefits, recognition of their achievements, and the right to do supplementary consulting work and to transfer to units where their talents could be better utilized.

In the 1980s research institutes, like all Chinese work units, responded to an economic system in which supplies were uncertain by attempting to be as self-sufficient as possible. Exchanges of information, services, or personnel across the very strictly defined administrative boundaries were difficult, resulting in failure to share expensive imported equipment and in widespread duplication of facilities. The absence of information on work being done in other research institutes, even in the same city, frequently led to duplication and repetition of research.

Like all other workers in China, scientists were assigned to research institutes or universities by government labor bureaus. Such assignments frequently did not reflect specialized skills or training. Assignments were meant to be permanent, and it was very difficult for scientists or engineers to transfer to another work unit. In many cases, talents or specialized training were wasted. Institutes that may have had the funds to purchase advanced foreign equipment often had no way to hire a Chinese chemist or mathematician. Not only were China's scientists and engineers in short supply, many were underemployed or misemployed.

==== Relation with the reform and opening up ====
Implementing the reforms of the science and technology system, however, presupposed reforms of the economic, industrial, and local administrative systems. In general, science and technology reforms represented the application to that sector of the principles underlying the sweeping reforms of the economy proposed in the October 1984 "Decision of the Central Committee of the Chinese Communist Party on Reform of the Economic Structure." Both reform "decisions" emphasized greater autonomy for institutions, a greater role for the market, more competition, and rewards for the successful introduction of improved products and processes. In every case, the goal was increased productivity and economic benefit.

The central provisions of the 1980s reform related to funding, the technology market and cooperative ventures, and the rights and potential job mobility of individual researchers. The intent of the reformers was to change the basic conditions of the economic system, so that the self-interest that had pushed managers of factories and research institutes toward compartmentalization, duplication, and hoarding of resources would henceforth push them toward cooperation, division of labor, and orientation toward the needs of the market. Because these reforms represented a radical departure from the procedures developed since the 1950s, the leadership anticipated that their implementation would be slow, and it planned to phase them in over a number of years.

Perhaps because of the centrality of funding to the whole reform scheme and because the administrative machinery for handling budgets was already in place, many concrete provisions for funding research were adopted following the March 1985 Central Committee decision. In February 1986 the State Council promulgated provisional regulations under which science and technology projects listed in the annual state economic plan were to be completed as contract research, in which there would be nationwide open bidding on the contracts. Banks were to monitor expenditures under the contract. Institutes conducting basic research were to have their regular operating expenses guaranteed by the state, but all other income would come from competitive research grants. The government was to continue to fund completely the institutes working in public health and medicine, family planning, environmental science, technical information, meteorology, and agriculture. In 1986 the newly established National Natural Science Foundation, explicitly modeled on the United States National Science Foundation, disbursed its first competitive awards, totaling ¥95 million, to 3,432 research projects selected from 12,000 applications. The amount of money awarded to individual projects was not large, but the precedent of competition, disregard of administrative boundaries, and expert appraisal of individual or small-group proposals was established and widely publicized. And, early in 1987, the NDSTIC announced that henceforth weapons procurement and military research and development would be managed through contracts and competitive bidding.

==== Technology markets and joint ventures ====
Commercializing technology requires markets, and China in the late 1980s had to develop market institutions to handle patents, the sale of technology, and consulting contracts. This was a major endeavor and one that promised to take many years. Deciding how to set prices for technology and how to write and enforce contracts for technical consulting proved difficult, largely because of the complexity of technology markets. Further, China lacked the legal and commercial frameworks to support such markets. Nevertheless, institutes and factories participated in "technology fairs" and established contractual relations in great numbers, with the total technology trade volume in 1986 reaching an estimated ¥2.3 billion. Research institutes and universities formed companies to sell technical services and develop products. Even the formerly self-contained Chinese Academy of Sciences set up companies to export specialty magnets and to develop optical products.

In the late 1980s, China's technology markets and efforts to commercialize scientific and technical knowledge were growing rapidly amid considerable confusion, ferment, and turmoil. Although progressing, the commercialization of technology was proving difficult to implement, and, perhaps for this reason, the State Council announced in February 1987 that most applied scientific research institutes were to be incorporated into large and medium-sized productive enterprises to coordinate research with the needs of production. The precise form the technology market would take was not clear, but its development had wide support and was not likely to be halted or reversed.

==== Personnel and job mobility ====
From one perspective the most important element of China's science and technology system has been its human capital — its trained scientists and engineers. By the 1980s it was widely recognized in the Chinese press that scientists, like all intellectuals, had been poorly treated, underpaid, and burdened with difficult living conditions that reduced their productivity. In many cases scientists' abilities were wasted because they were assigned to jobs outside their expertise or because their institute already had all the professionals in their field it needed and there was no way for them to change jobs. Many Chinese science policy writers were familiar with the conclusion of Western specialists that scientific progress and the effective application of science to practical problems are facilitated by personnel mobility. Accordingly, the March 1985 party Central Committee decision called for reform of the personnel system to promote a "rational flow" of scientific and technical personnel.

Throughout the late 1980s, however, job mobility and attempts to place scientists where their talents could have the greatest effect were the aspect of reform in which least was achieved. Transfer of scientists from one unit to another remained a major step, and a relatively infrequent one. According to the State Science and Technology Commission, 2 percent of scientists and engineers changed work units in 1983, and only 4 percent in 1985. Personnel still required the permission of their work unit heads to transfer, and that permission often was withheld. Many directors of institutes were accused of having a "feudal mentality," that is, regarding personnel as part of their unit's property.

The State Council reiterated in the mid-1980s that scientists and engineers had the right to do consulting work in their spare time. In practice, however, such spare-time consulting often created problems within the work unit as some institute directors attempted to confiscate payments for consulting or even to charge their personnel in the local courts with corruption and theft of state property. Although the press gave considerable publicity to scientists who had left the "iron rice bowl" of a Chinese Academy of Sciences institute to start their own business or to join a growing collective or rural factory, such resignations remained relatively rare. Possibly more common were practices whereby institutes detailed their personnel on temporary consulting contracts to productive enterprises.

The difficulties in transferring scientific personnel even when the Central Committee and the State Council made it official policy demonstrated the significance of China's unique work-unit system of employment and economic organization and the obstacles it presented to reform. Allowing personnel to decide for themselves to move out of the work units to which the state and the party assigned them was a major break with the practices that had become institutionalized in China since 1949. Some observers believed that because of its potential challenge to the authority of the party, which controlled personnel matters in all work units, job mobility for scientists, even though it would have promoted scientific productivity and the growth of the economy, may have been too extreme a reform to be feasible.

== Contemporary China ==
In 1998, the Commission on Science, Technology, and Industry for National Defense (COSTIND) began the "national defense science and technology innovation project."

The discourse of a "whole of nation system" (xinxing juguo tizhi) for China's science and technology innovation policies developed in 2006 and 2007, and was then adapted into official innovation policy discourses a few years later. "Whole of nation system" discourse was adapted from its use in the context of training athletes in China for international competition.

During the Xi Jinping era, China has increasingly focused on innovation, through the paradigm of "innovation-driven development." "Innovation consortia" have developed: these are groups of organizations including firms, universities, research institutes, and national laboratories which are connected through contractual relationships to work together on a particular technology.

In 2014, the China Integrated Circuit Industry Investment Fund was established in an effort to reduce dependence on foreign semiconductor companies. Jointly established by the Ministry of Industry and Information Technology and the Ministry of Finance, the fund was valued at more than 138 billion rmb within a year.

In 2022, China passed both the US and the European Union in the number of high-impact research papers published.

In 2023, the Communist Part of China established the Central Science and Technology Commission (CSTC), chaired by Ding Xuexiang, as a science, technology, and innovation policy body.

As of 2024, the Nature Index ranked seven Chinese universities or institutions in the global top ten for volume of research output. The Leiden Ranking rates six in the global top ten.

== Technology transfer ==
=== Policy ===
In the late 1980s, China's goals of modernization and rapid economic growth depended on the large-scale introduction of foreign technology. The task was to import technology to renovate and upgrade several thousand factories, mines, and power stations whose levels of productivity and energy efficiency were far below prevailing international standards.

Since 1980 Chinese policy statements stressed the need to improve existing facilities, to import technology rather than finished goods, and to renovate factories through selective purchase of key technology rather than through purchase of whole plants. This was an unprecedented problem, since China's previous experience with technology transfer, both in the massive Soviet technical-aid program of the 1950s and in the more modest purchases of fertilizer and petrochemical plants in the 1960s and early 1970s, featured large projects that brought in complete plants. In the 1980s much of the technology imported was production or process technology, representing better ways of producing items China already manufactured, such as truck transmissions or telephone cables. Such technology was usually the proprietary knowledge of foreign corporations, and China demonstrated an unprecedented willingness to cooperate with such firms. With the explicit aim of promoting technology imports, China made great efforts to attract foreign businesses and foreign capital and permitted joint ventures and even foreign-owned subsidiaries to operate in China.

China's economic planners gave priority in technology imports to electronics, telecommunications, electric-power generation and transmission, transportation equipment, and energy-saving devices. The degree of central control over technology imports fluctuated in the 1980s, reflecting changing foreign trade policies and foreign exchange balances, but the overall trend was toward devolution of decision making to those who used the technology or equipment. Bank loans and other means were made available to encourage end users to select appropriate technology.

=== Modes of transfer ===
The transfer of proprietary technology from a foreign corporation is, among other things, a commercial transaction, and such transactions take many forms. Chinese authorities have selected joint-equity ventures as their preferred mode of technology transfer. In such ventures, both the foreign and the Chinese partner contribute capital, each provides what it has the advantage in (usually technology and access to the global market from the foreign partner and labor and a factory from the Chinese partner), management and profits are then split. Many major foreign corporations with technology that China desires have been reluctant to risk their capital in such ventures. But enough have agreed to produce such items as jet airliners, computers, and machine tools that Chinese authorities can claim success for their policies.

=== Linking technology and economics ===
China's special economic zones facilitated technology transfer. Foreign investors in SEZs could negotiate to sell some of their goods produced in the SEZ to Chinese markets provided they agree to significant technology transfer. This policy approach became known as "trading market for technology".

As they have accumulated experience in dealing with foreign corporations, Chinese economic administrators and enterprise managers have become better able to negotiate contracts that still permit the necessary training and consultation in the use of foreign technology. By the late 1980s, the transfer of foreign technology had become a normal commercial transaction. To an increasing extent, policy and practices for technology transfer were becoming part of general economic and foreign trade policies. China faced problems in assimilating technology in the factories that imported it and in deciding which foreign technologies to import. It was becoming clear to Chinese planners and foreign suppliers of technology that these problems reflected overall deficiencies in technical and management skills and that they were general economic and management problems. The solution to these problems was increasingly seen by Chinese administrators as lying in reforms of the economy and industrial management. The effort to import and assimilate foreign technology thus served to help unify technology policy and economic policy and to overcome the problems of the separation of science, technology, and the economy, which China's leaders had been trying to solve since the early 1950s.

== See also ==
- History of science and technology in China (Chinese civilization)
- Science and technology in China (present day)
- Science in newly industrialized countries
- Scientific publishing in China
