= Yanshan =

Yanshan may refer to:

== Places ==
- Yanshan County, Hebei (盐山县)
- Yanshan County, Jiangxi (铅山县)
- Yanshan County, Yunnan (砚山县)
- Yanshan District (雁山区), Guilin, Guangxi
  - Yanshan Subdistrict (雁山街道), in Yanshan District
- Yanshan Avenue Subdistrict (燕山大街街道), Haigang District, Qinhuangdao, Hebei

Area

- Yanshan, Beijing (燕山地区), in Fangshan District, Beijing

Towns

- Yanshan Town, Guangxi (雁山镇), in Yanshan District
- Yanshan, Guizhou (砚山镇), in Wuchuan Gelao and Miao Autonomous County
- Yanshan, Cangzhou (盐山镇), seat of Yanshan County, Hebei
- Yanshan, Heilongjiang (砚山镇), in Fujin City

== Others ==
- Yan Mountains (燕山), mountain range to the north of the North China Plain
- Yanshan Temple (岩山寺), in Fanzhi County, Shanxi
- Yanshan University (燕山大学), in Qinhuangdao, Hebei
