= Baixi Reservoir =

Reservoir in China

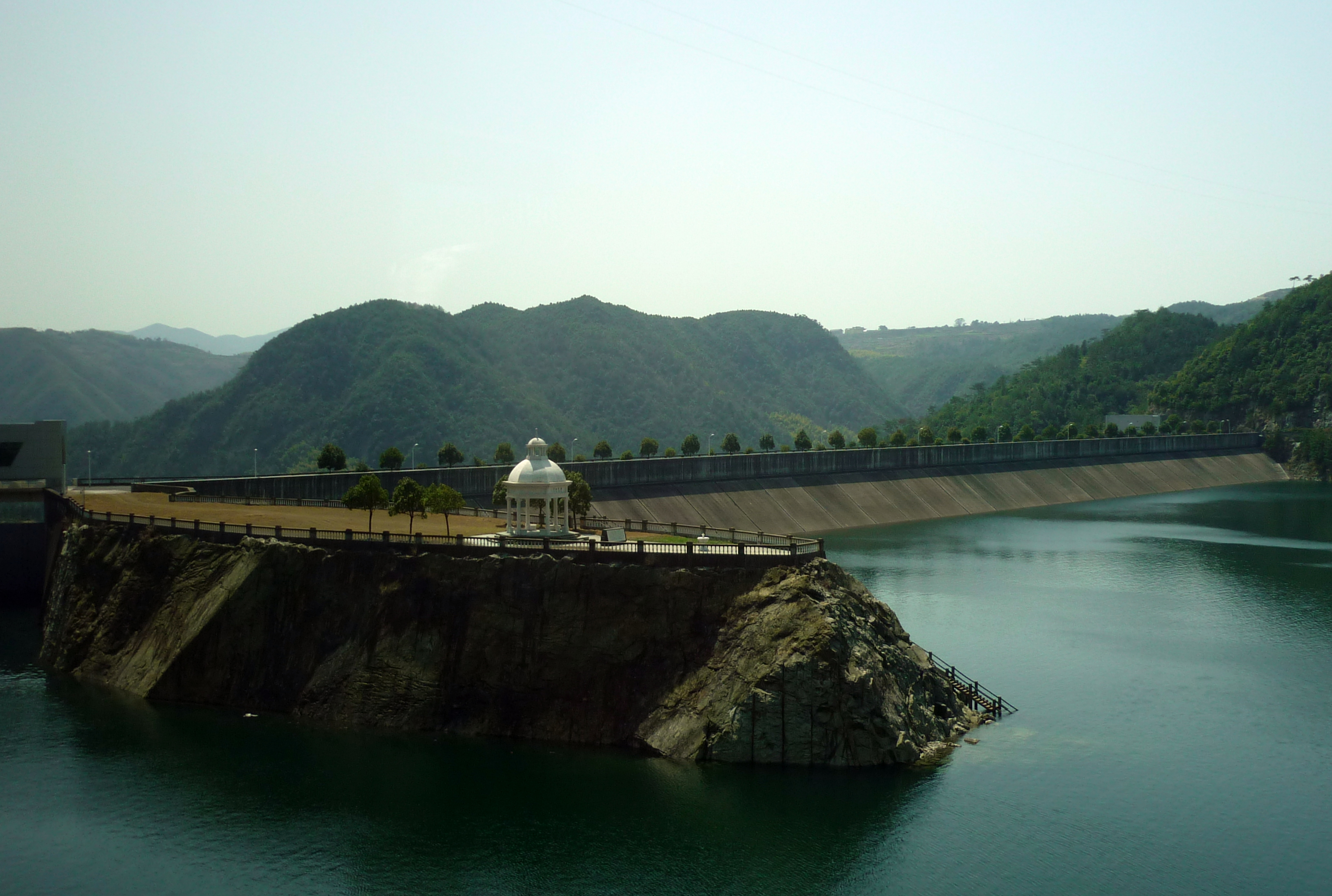
- Interactive map of Baixi Reservoir
- Location: Ninghai County, Ningbo City, Zhejiang Province
- Coordinates: 23.7284°N 115.2193°E
- Purpose: water supply and flood control
- Construction began: December 31, 1996

Baixi Reservoir (simplified Chinese: 白溪水库; traditional Chinese: 白溪水庫; pinyin: Báixī shuǐkù) is a reservoir in Ninghai County, Ningbo City, Zhejiang Province, China, located in the middle reaches of the main stream of Baixi. It is a large (2) scale water conservancy hub project mainly for water supply and flood control, taking into account power generation and irrigation. It is Ningbo's main drinking water source.

Construction on the Baixi Reservoir started on December 31, 1996, and was completed on March 31, 2001. It has a total storage capacity of 168.4 million cubic metres (5.95×10^{9} cubic feet) and a rainwater collection area of 254 square metres (2,730 square feet).

Experts argued that in drought years, Baixi Reservoir can supply 173 million cubic meters of clear and high-quality raw water to Ningbo every year.

In 2001, Ningbo Tianhe Ecological Scenic Area, which is based on Baixi Reservoir, was named a National Water Conservancy Scenic Area by the Ministry of Water Resources of China.
