= Chalu, Zhejiang =

Chalu 岔路镇
- Town
- Location in Zhejiang
- Coordinates: 29°12′11″N 121°28′30″E
- Country: People's Republic of China
- Province: Zhejiang
- Prefecture-level city: Ningbo
- County: Ninghai County
- Time zone: UTC+8 (China Standard)

Chalu (Chinese: 岔路; pinyin: Chàlù) is a town under the administration of Ninghai County, Zhejiang, China. As of 2020, it administers Xingzhong (兴中) Residential Neighborhood and the following 21 villages:

- Chalu Village
- Xiafan Village (下畈村)
- Hutou Village (湖头村)
- Zhao'an Village (兆岸村)
- Gankeng Village (干坑村)
- Shanglikeng Village (上李坑村)
- Chaijia Village (柴家村)
- Qianhoulou Village (前后娄村)
- Dudong Village (渡东村)
- Shangjin Village (上金村)
- Meihua Village (梅花村)
- Baixi Village (白溪村)
- Dayan Village (大岩村)
- Shanyang Village (山洋村)
- Shangwuji Village (上屋基村)
- Gaotang Village (高塘村)
- Quanfeng Village (泉峰村)
- Dingfeng Village (顶峰村)
- Lüjia Village (吕家村)
- Guanfeng Village (冠峰村)
- Tianhe Village (天河村)
