= Ninghai County =

County in Zhejiang, China

Ninghai 宁海县
- County
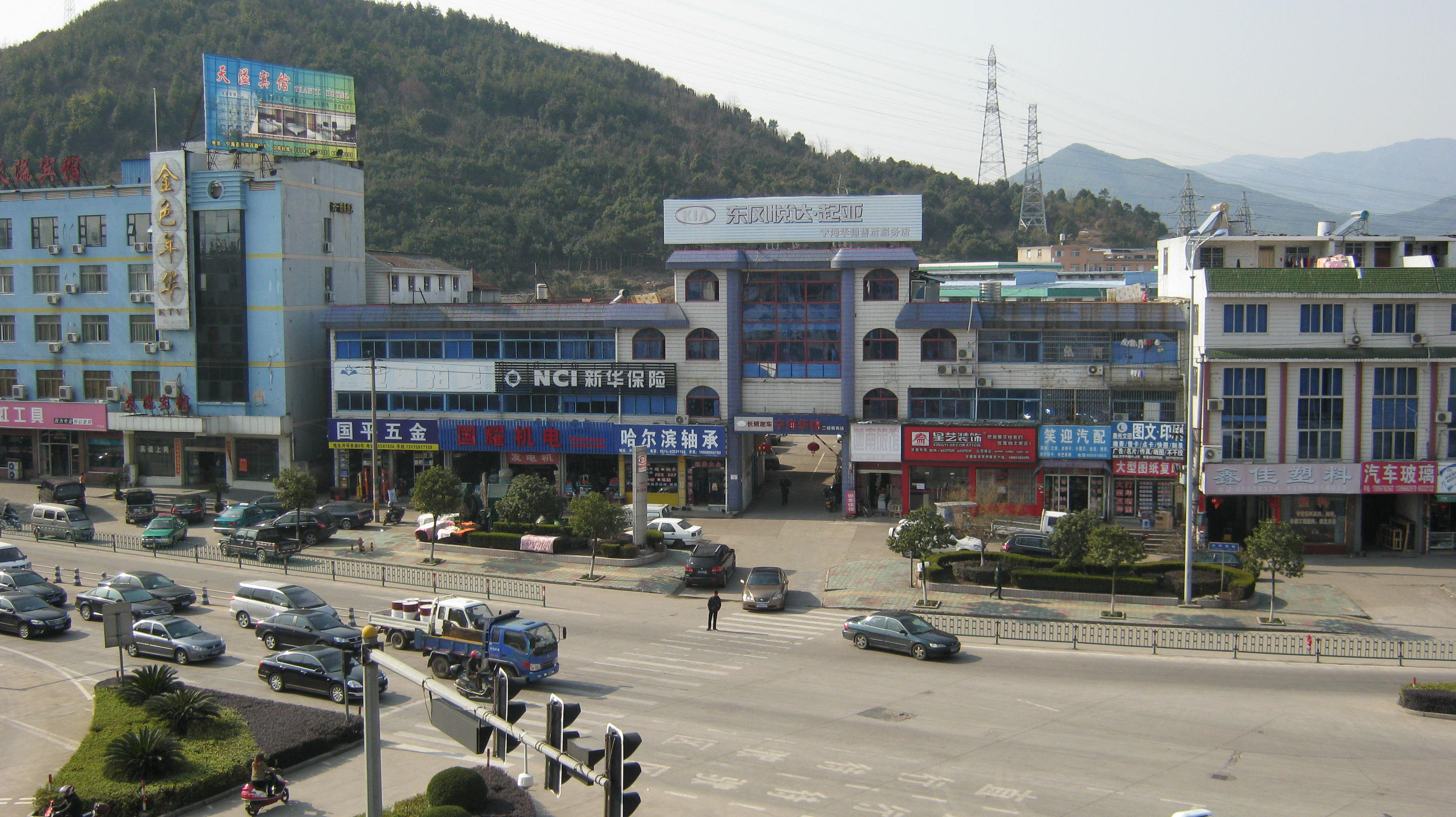
- Ninghai with Wushi mountain at the back.

- Ninghai in Ningbo

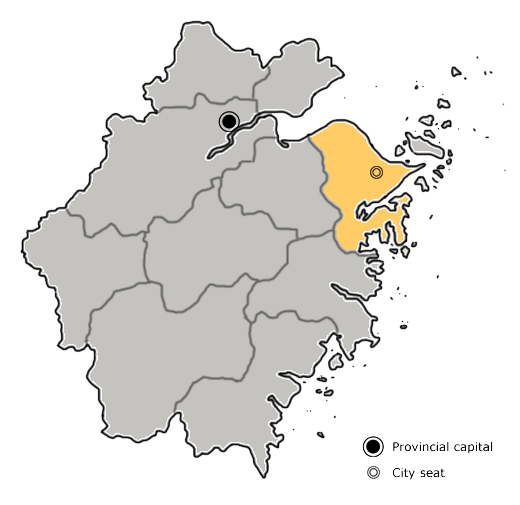
- Ningbo in Zhejiang
- Coordinates: 29°17′17″N 121°25′44″E
- Country: People's Republic of China
- Province: Zhejiang
- Prefecture-level city: Ningbo

Area
  - Total: 1,861.20 km^{2} (718.61 sq mi)

Population (2020)
  - Total: 682,000
  - Density: 366/km^{2} (949/sq mi)
- Time zone: UTC+8 (China Standard)

Ninghai County (simplified Chinese: 宁海县; traditional Chinese: 寧海縣; pinyin: Nínghǎi Xiàn; lit. 'peaceful sea') is a county under the administration of Ningbo, in the east of Zhejiang province, People's Republic of China. It covers a land area of 1,712.50 km^{2} (661.20 sq mi) and a sea area 213.35 km^{2} (82.37 sq mi) of and has a 173.86 km (108.03 mi) coastline. It has four sub-districts, 11 towns, three townships and a population of 682,000.

== Natural Geography ==
Ninghai is located in the eastern part of Zhejiang and on the southern flank of the Yangtze Delta. It is part of the Shanghai Economic Development Region. It is 70 km (43 mi) away from the Ningbo urban area, 66 km (41 mi) away from Ningbo International Airport, 90 km (56 mi) away from Beilun port. 210 km (130 mi) and 380 km (240 mi) separate Ninghai from respectively Hangzhou and Shanghai. From a meteorological standpoint, it belongs to the subtropical monsoon zone, and is under the influence of perennial southeast winds. Ninghai enjoys a comfortably warm and humid climate, rainfall and sunshine. Temperature and relative hygrometry average 15.3-17 Celsius and 78% respectively, while the average annual rainfall registers at 1000–1600 mm. Ninghai County was established as a trial county for the state ecological preservation program. As a result, its air quality is comparatively fresh and clean, and the water quality of the five major rivulets is excellent.

== History ==
In the late Stone Age, Ninghai was already home to primitive settlements. In 280 AD (during the West Jin dynasty) it was recognized as a county, whose seat was at Baijiao. Later, during the Sui dynasty (589 AD), it ceased to be an independent county and instead became part of the Linhai County. The year 621 AD saw it restored as a county, with its seat at Haiyou (part of the present Sanmen County), subsequently merged into the Zhang’an County. In 689 AD, as Empress Wu Zetian rose to power, Ninghai's administrative status was once more restored to county level, with its seat placed at Guangduli (the present Chengguan Town). During the year 706 AD, the eastern land expanse of the county was put under the jurisdiction of the Xiangshan county.

In 1940, i.e. the 29th year of the Minguo period, a new county, Sanmen, was established. It comprised 17 towns, including the town of Haiyou. After its establishment as a county, Ninghai had successively been part of Linhai Prefecture, of the Taizhoulu Prefecture, and of the Taizhou Prefecture. When the PRC was founded in 1949, the county land was first part of the Taizhou Prefecture, then became part of the Ningbo Prefecture before it reverted to the Taizhou Prefecture. But in October 1958, it was abolished as an independent county and was incorporated into the Xiangshan county, whose seat was successively the towns of Liyang and Chengguan. In October 1961, Ninghai county was re-established as part of the Ningbo Prefecture, of which became Ningbo City in July 1983.

== Administrative divisions ==
Subdistricts:

- Yuelong Subdistrict (跃龙街道), Meilin Subdistrict (梅林街道), Qiaotouhu Subdistrict (桥头胡街道), Taoyuan Subdistrict (桃源街道)

Towns:

- Changjie (长街镇), Chalu (岔路镇), Dajiahe (大佳何镇), Huangtan (黄坛镇), Liyang (力洋镇), Qiangjiao (强蛟镇), Qiantong (前童镇), Shenquan (深甽镇), Sangzhou (桑洲镇), Xidian (西店镇), Yishi (一市镇)

Townships:

- Chayuan Township (茶院乡), Huchen Township (胡陈乡), Yuexi Township (越溪乡)

== Climate ==
Climate data for Ninghai, elevation 39 m (128 ft), (1991–2020 normals, extremes 1981–present)
Month	Jan	Feb	Mar	Apr	May	Jun	Jul	Aug	Sep	Oct	Nov	Dec	Year
Record high °C (°F)	26.1 (79.0)	29.7 (85.5)	33.0 (91.4)	34.1 (93.4)	33.7 (92.7)	38.2 (100.8)	40.7 (105.3)	40.8 (105.4)	38.0 (100.4)	34.1 (93.4)	29.9 (85.8)	25.7 (78.3)	40.8 (105.4)
Mean daily maximum °C (°F)	10.2 (50.4)	12.0 (53.6)	15.7 (60.3)	21.3 (70.3)	25.6 (78.1)	28.6 (83.5)	32.8 (91.0)	32.4 (90.3)	28.6 (83.5)	24.1 (75.4)	18.8 (65.8)	12.9 (55.2)	21.9 (71.5)
Daily mean °C (°F)	5.9 (42.6)	7.4 (45.3)	10.9 (51.6)	16.1 (61.0)	21.0 (69.8)	24.5 (76.1)	28.5 (83.3)	28.1 (82.6)	24.5 (76.1)	19.5 (67.1)	14.1 (57.4)	8.2 (46.8)	17.4 (63.3)
Mean daily minimum °C (°F)	2.7 (36.9)	4.0 (39.2)	7.3 (45.1)	12.1 (53.8)	17.3 (63.1)	21.5 (70.7)	25.2 (77.4)	24.9 (76.8)	21.2 (70.2)	15.7 (60.3)	10.4 (50.7)	4.6 (40.3)	13.9 (57.0)
Record low °C (°F)	−8.4 (16.9)	−6.1 (21.0)	−4.9 (23.2)	−0.5 (31.1)	7.1 (44.8)	12.0 (53.6)	17.7 (63.9)	18.1 (64.6)	11.4 (52.5)	1.2 (34.2)	−3.3 (26.1)	−7.1 (19.2)	−8.4 (16.9)
Average precipitation mm (inches)	74.2 (2.92)	73.1 (2.88)	120.8 (4.76)	114.7 (4.52)	147.2 (5.80)	252.0 (9.92)	205.2 (8.08)	292.7 (11.52)	191.5 (7.54)	88.3 (3.48)	72.1 (2.84)	62.4 (2.46)	1,694.2 (66.72)
Average precipitation days (≥ 0.1 mm)	11.8	12.2	16.1	14.5	15.3	18.0	14.5	16.7	13.4	8.1	11.2	10.1	161.9
Average snowy days	2.4	2.0	0.5	0.1	0	0	0	0	0	0	0	0.9	5.9
Average relative humidity (%)	75	76	76	76	79	84	80	81	80	76	77	74	78
Mean monthly sunshine hours	102.9	100.9	118.4	138.7	138.4	105.5	203.7	191.3	146.9	154.5	115.6	120.9	1,637.7
Percentage possible sunshine	32	32	32	36	33	25	48	47	40	44	36	38	37
Source: China Meteorological Administrationall-time extreme temperature

== Cultural Heritage ==
A number of famous people originated from Ninghai. In the Southern Song dynasty, the Privy Council Secretary Zheng Lin, the Right Prime Minister Ye Mengding, the historian Hu Sansheng and the litterateur Shu Yueyang took official posts in the Court, together with the powerful minister Jia Sidao. The three were reluctant to submit to Jia's influence. After Zheng Lin was killed by Jia Sidao, Ye Mengding, Hu Sansheng and another official named Shu Yuexiang renounced their governmental posts and devoted themselves to academic studies.

Fang Xiaoru was a Ming official and scholar who wrote several works and advised the emperor. The emperor to whom Fang Xiaoru had pledged his allegiance fell from power, after a civil war in 1399. Zhu Di, the new emperor, asked Fang to draft new law legitimizing his succession. Fang Xiaoru refused, was tortured and killed.

In modern times, writer Rou Shi, one of the Five Martyrs of the League of Left-Wing Writers, and the great painter Pan Tianshou came from Ninghai.

== Tourism ==
Ninghai sits at the foot of the Tiantai Mount (Chinese: 天台山) facing the East China Sea. It presents attractive opportunities for tourism. Xu Xiake mentions the Lianghuang Mountain, located in the western part of the county, in the first chapter of his travels stories. In the north, the Yancang Mountain was a place of residence for Mr. Huang during the West Han dynasty. It is now one of the ten Scenic Spots associated with Ningbo City. In the south, the Shouning Temple is where famous Monk Jian Zhen lived during the Tang dynasty, before sailing off to Japan. Ninghai also boasts Nanxi hot spring as one of the three best hot springs in the nation. A national forest park, deep gorges in east Zhejing, the Liantou Mountain and a number of antique buildings in the town of Qiantong make worthy scenic spots, where culture and nature combine. Further Ninghai counts with trade centers, complete with cultural and entertainment facilities, besides 11 hotels suitable for foreign tourists, two of them ranked at four stars.

Ninghai is known for its mountainous landscape. One of the mountains, called Wangai (王爱山), stands close to Tiantai Mount. It was there that Xu Xiake (徐霞客) started his travel to Tiantai Mount. From its flanks, one has a full view of the Zhejiang Grand Canyon (浙江大峡谷) and of the Baixi Reservoir (白溪水库). The local peach is a local specialty.

== Economy ==
In the late 1980s Ninghai developed a stationary industry from its existing molding industry. Nowadays it is the largest center for stationary production in China, 70% of the production is exported, which corresponds to 10% of China's stationary products export in total. Ninghai produces 80% of binder clips worldwide, and 10% of hole punchers and pencil sharpeners sold worldwide. In 2012 the total revenue of the local stationary industry reached 8.6 billion RMB. A major stationary producer from Ninghai is Deli Stationary.
