= Qiantong, Zhejiang =

Qiantong 前童镇
- Town
- Interactive map of Qiantong
- Coordinates: 29°13′42″N 121°20′54″E
- Country: People's Republic of China
- Province: Zhejiang
- Sub-provincial city: Ningbo
- County: Ninghai

Area
  - Total: 68.77 km^{2} (26.55 sq mi)
- Elevation: 37 m (121 ft)

Population
  - Total: 24,300
  - Density: 353/km^{2} (915/sq mi)
- Time zone: UTC+8 (China Standard)
- Postal code: 315606
- Area code: 0574
- Website: qt.ninghai.gov.cn

Qiantong (Chinese: 前童; pinyin: Qiántóng) is a town in southwestern Ninghai County in eastern Zhejiang province, China, situated along G15 Shenyang–Haikou Expressway around 11 kilometres (6.8 mi) southwest of the county seat as the crow flies. As of 2011, it has 29 villages under its administration. The town was established in the last years of the Song dynasty, though much of its architecture dates from the Ming or Qing; a large proportion of its residents are surnamed Tong (童).

== See also ==
- List of township-level divisions of Zhejiang
