= Xidian, Zhejiang =

Xidian 西店镇
- Town
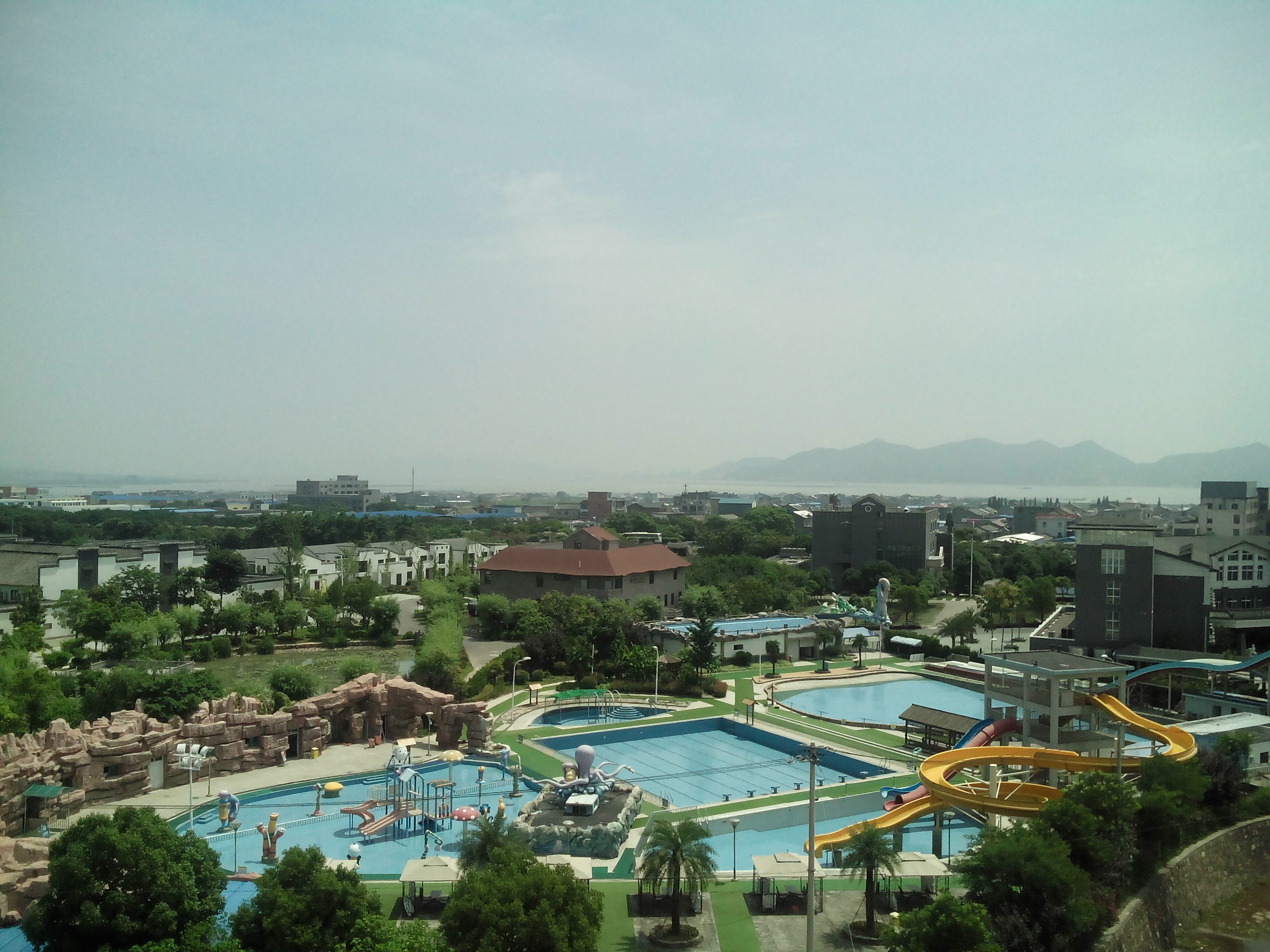
- Interactive map of Xidian
- Coordinates: 29°28′43″N 121°26′12″E
- Country: People's Republic of China
- Province: Zhejiang
- Sub-provincial city: Ningbo
- County: Ninghai
- Village-level divisions: 1 residential community 21 villages

Area
  - Total: 102.3 km^{2} (39.5 sq mi)
- Elevation: 17 m (56 ft)

Population
  - Total: 42,400
- Time zone: UTC+8 (China Standard)
- Postal code: 315613
- Area code: 0574
- Website: xd.ninghai.gov.cn

Xidian (Chinese: 西店; pinyin: xīdiàn) is a town in Ninghai County in eastern Zhejiang province, China, abutting Xiangshan Harbour (象山港) to the east and about 20 kilometres (12 mi) north of the county seat. It borders Fenghua to the north, Meilin Subdistrict (梅林街道) to the south, and Shenquan (深甽镇) to the west. As of 2011, it had one residential community (社区) and 11 villages under its administration. In January 2010, Xidian was designated a satellite town of Ningbo, rendering it some county-level economic and social administrative rights, though it is de jure a town, one level below the county.

== Economy ==
Xidian's industrial output primarily consists of household electronics, educational materials, automotive spare parts, and in 2001, the town was the No. 1 producer of flashlights at the township-level.

== Transport ==
G15 Shenyang–Haikou Expressway has an exit, also designated as the northern exit for Ninghai County, in the town. The Ningbo–Taizhou–Wenzhou Railway also passes through the vicinity.

== See also ==
- List of township-level divisions of Zhejiang
