= Qiantong, Hebei =

Qiantong 千童镇
- Town
- Interactive map of Qiantong
- Coordinates: 37°51′38″N 117°08′08″E
- Country: People's Republic of China
- Province: Hebei
- Prefecture-level city: Cangzhou
- County: Yanshan
- Elevation: 13 m (43 ft)
- Time zone: UTC+8 (China Standard)
- Postal code: 061306
- Area code: 0317

Qiantong (Chinese: 千童; pinyin: Qiāntóng) is a town in Yanshan County in southeastern Hebei province, China, situated around 2 kilometres (1.2 mi) north of the border with Shandong and 23 km (14 mi) south-southwest of the county seat. As of 2011, it has 29 villages under its administration.

== See also ==
- List of township-level divisions of Hebei
