= Yanshan, Beijing =

Former district of Beijing, China

Yanshan 燕山区
- District of the People's Republic of China
- 1980–1986
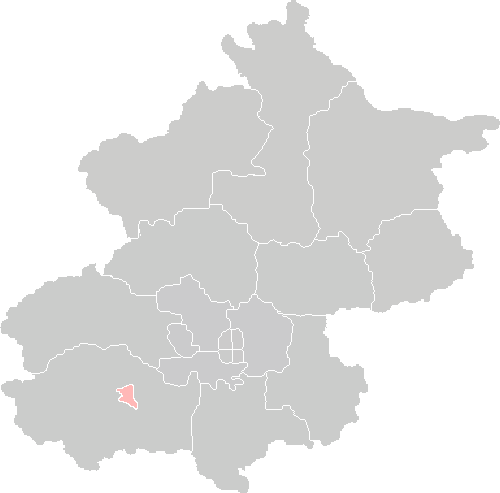
- Location of Yanshan on Beijing.
- History
  - Established: 1980
  - Disestablished: 1986
Succeeded by
Fangshan District
- Today part of: Fangshan District, Beijing

Yanshan District (simplified Chinese: 燕山区; traditional Chinese: 燕山區; pinyin: Yànshān Qū) is a former district of Beijing, located southwest of the city center, and was situated in the middle of Fangshan. It spanned an area of 37.8 square kilometres (14.6 mi^{2}). It bordered Fangshan throughout on all four sides. It merged into the Fangshan in 1986.
