= Yanshan County, Hebei =

Yanshan County 盐山县 Yenshan
- County
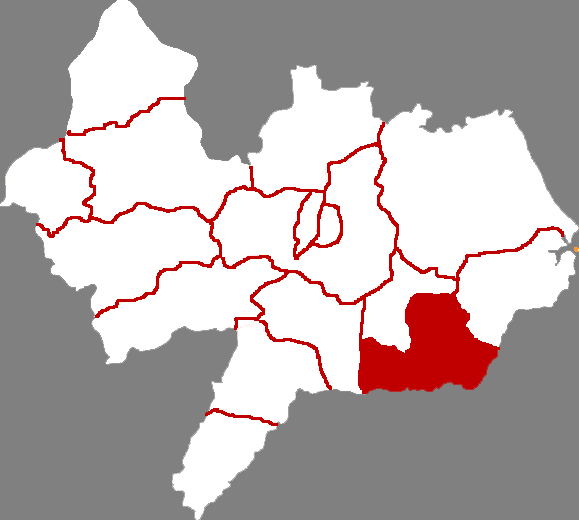
- Yanshan in Cangzhou

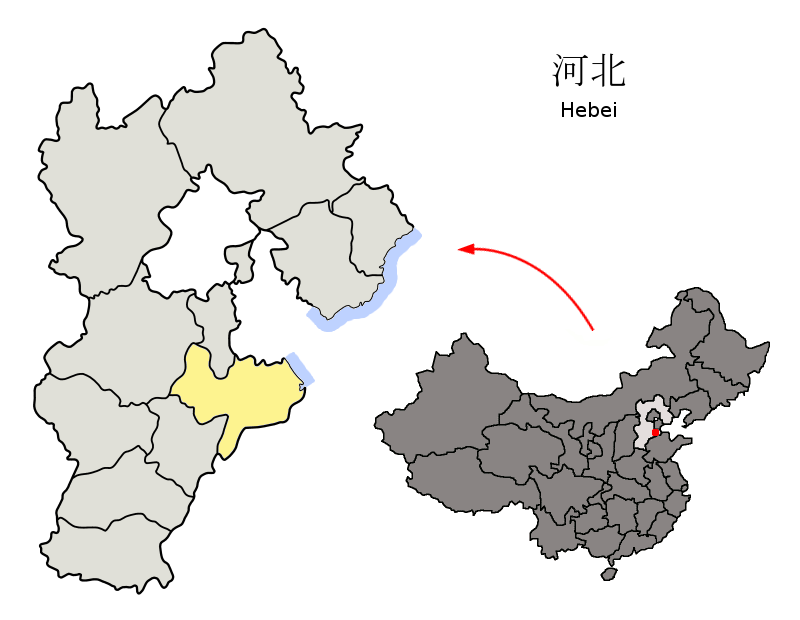
- Cangzhou in Hebei
- Coordinates: 38°03′29″N 117°13′52″E
- Country: People's Republic of China
- Province: Hebei
- Prefecture-level city: Cangzhou
- County seat: Yanshan Town (盐山镇)

Area
  - Total: 795 km^{2} (307 sq mi)
- Elevation: 12 m (39 ft)

Population (2020)
  - Total: 411,356
  - Density: 517/km^{2} (1,340/sq mi)
- Time zone: UTC+8 (China Standard)
- Postal code: 061300
- Area code: 0317

Yanshan County (simplified Chinese: 盐山县; traditional Chinese: 鹽山縣; pinyin: Yánshān Xiàn; lit. 'Salt Mountain') is a county in the east of Hebei province, China, bordering Shandong to the south and east. It is under the administration of Cangzhou City, and it has a population of 411,356 residing in an area of 795 km^{2} (307 sq mi). China National Highway 205 runs northwest–southeast through the county.

== Administrative divisions ==
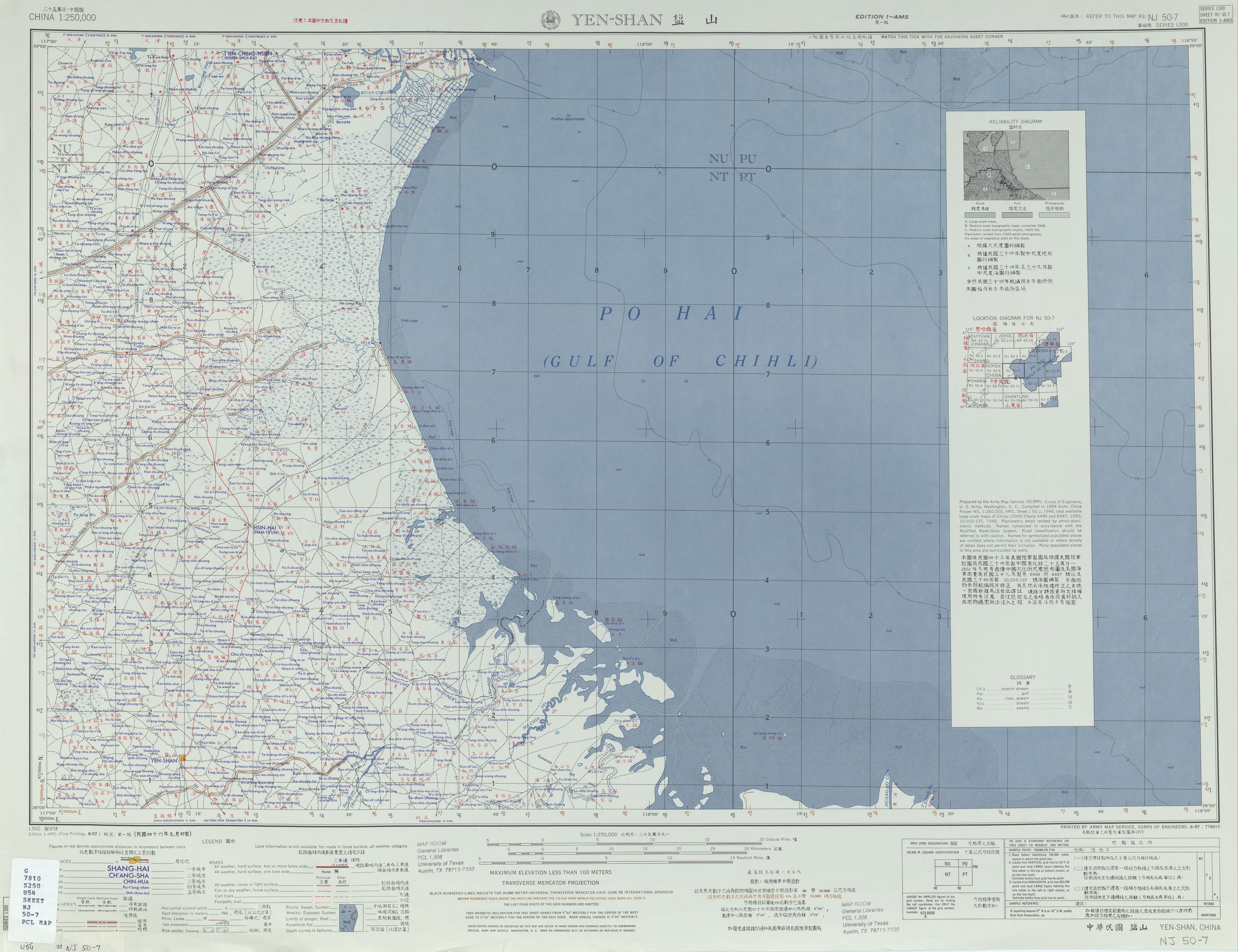
Yanshan (labelled as YEN-SHAN 𥂁山) (1957)

There are 6 towns and 6 townships under the county's administration.

Towns:

- Yanshan (盐山镇), Wangshu (望树镇), Hanji (韩集镇), Shengfo (圣佛镇), Qingyun (庆云镇), Qiantong (千童镇)

Townships:

- Bianwu Township (边务乡), Xiaoying Township (小营乡), Mengdian Township (孟店乡), Xiaozhuang Township (小庄乡), Yangji Township (杨集乡), Changzhuang Township (常庄乡)

== Climate ==
Climate data for Yanshan, elevation 8 m (26 ft), (1991–2020 normals, extremes 1981–2010)
Month	Jan	Feb	Mar	Apr	May	Jun	Jul	Aug	Sep	Oct	Nov	Dec	Year
Record high °C (°F)	16.8 (62.2)	22.0 (71.6)	29.7 (85.5)	31.8 (89.2)	40.3 (104.5)	41.2 (106.2)	41.1 (106.0)	36.5 (97.7)	35.6 (96.1)	31.2 (88.2)	25.0 (77.0)	17.6 (63.7)	41.2 (106.2)
Mean daily maximum °C (°F)	2.7 (36.9)	6.6 (43.9)	13.4 (56.1)	20.7 (69.3)	26.9 (80.4)	31.4 (88.5)	32.0 (89.6)	30.4 (86.7)	26.9 (80.4)	20.4 (68.7)	11.5 (52.7)	4.4 (39.9)	18.9 (66.1)
Daily mean °C (°F)	−2.9 (26.8)	0.4 (32.7)	7.0 (44.6)	14.2 (57.6)	20.5 (68.9)	25.3 (77.5)	27.1 (80.8)	25.7 (78.3)	21.2 (70.2)	14.3 (57.7)	5.9 (42.6)	−0.8 (30.6)	13.2 (55.7)
Mean daily minimum °C (°F)	−7.3 (18.9)	−4.3 (24.3)	1.6 (34.9)	8.3 (46.9)	14.3 (57.7)	19.6 (67.3)	22.8 (73.0)	21.9 (71.4)	16.4 (61.5)	9.2 (48.6)	1.4 (34.5)	−4.9 (23.2)	8.3 (46.9)
Record low °C (°F)	−21.5 (−6.7)	−16.4 (2.5)	−10.9 (12.4)	−3.1 (26.4)	2.6 (36.7)	10.1 (50.2)	15.6 (60.1)	13.5 (56.3)	4.5 (40.1)	−3.3 (26.1)	−13.1 (8.4)	−20.1 (−4.2)	−21.5 (−6.7)
Average precipitation mm (inches)	2.4 (0.09)	7.5 (0.30)	8.3 (0.33)	22.7 (0.89)	33.4 (1.31)	70.1 (2.76)	163.8 (6.45)	151.5 (5.96)	37.2 (1.46)	32.8 (1.29)	14.0 (0.55)	3.2 (0.13)	546.9 (21.52)
Average precipitation days (≥ 0.1 mm)	1.4	2.6	2.9	4.9	5.9	8.0	11.3	9.4	6.0	4.6	3.5	2.0	62.5
Average snowy days	2.3	2.4	0.7	0.2	0	0	0	0	0	0	0.9	1.7	8.2
Average relative humidity (%)	59	57	53	55	59	62	76	80	72	65	65	62	64
Mean monthly sunshine hours	174.2	179.4	234.7	239.2	267.1	236.8	196.4	198.4	215.2	202.5	166.2	165.8	2,475.9
Percentage possible sunshine	57	58	63	60	60	54	44	48	58	59	55	56	56
Source: China Meteorological Administration
