= Qufu South railway station =

Railway station in Jining, Shandong

Qufu South 曲阜南

General information
- Location: Qufu, Jining, Shandong; China
- Coordinates: 35°30′36.7″N 117°1′4.92″E
- Lines: Rizhao–Lankao high-speed railway; Beijing–Shanghai high-speed railway (via chord to Qufu East)
- Platforms: 2

History
- Opened: 26 December 2021
Location

Qufu South railway station (Chinese: 曲阜南站) is a railway station in Qufu, Jining, Shandong, China. Opened on 26 December 2021, it is an intermediate stop on the west–east Rizhao–Lankao high-speed railway. The nearby Qufu East railway station is an intermediate stop on the north–south Beijing–Shanghai high-speed railway. The two stations are connected via a chord.

The station has two side platforms.

Preceding station	China Railway High-speed	Following station
Sishui South towards Rizhao West	Rizhao–Lankao high-speed railway	Jining East towards Lankao South
