= Qufu railway station =

Railway station in Shandong, China

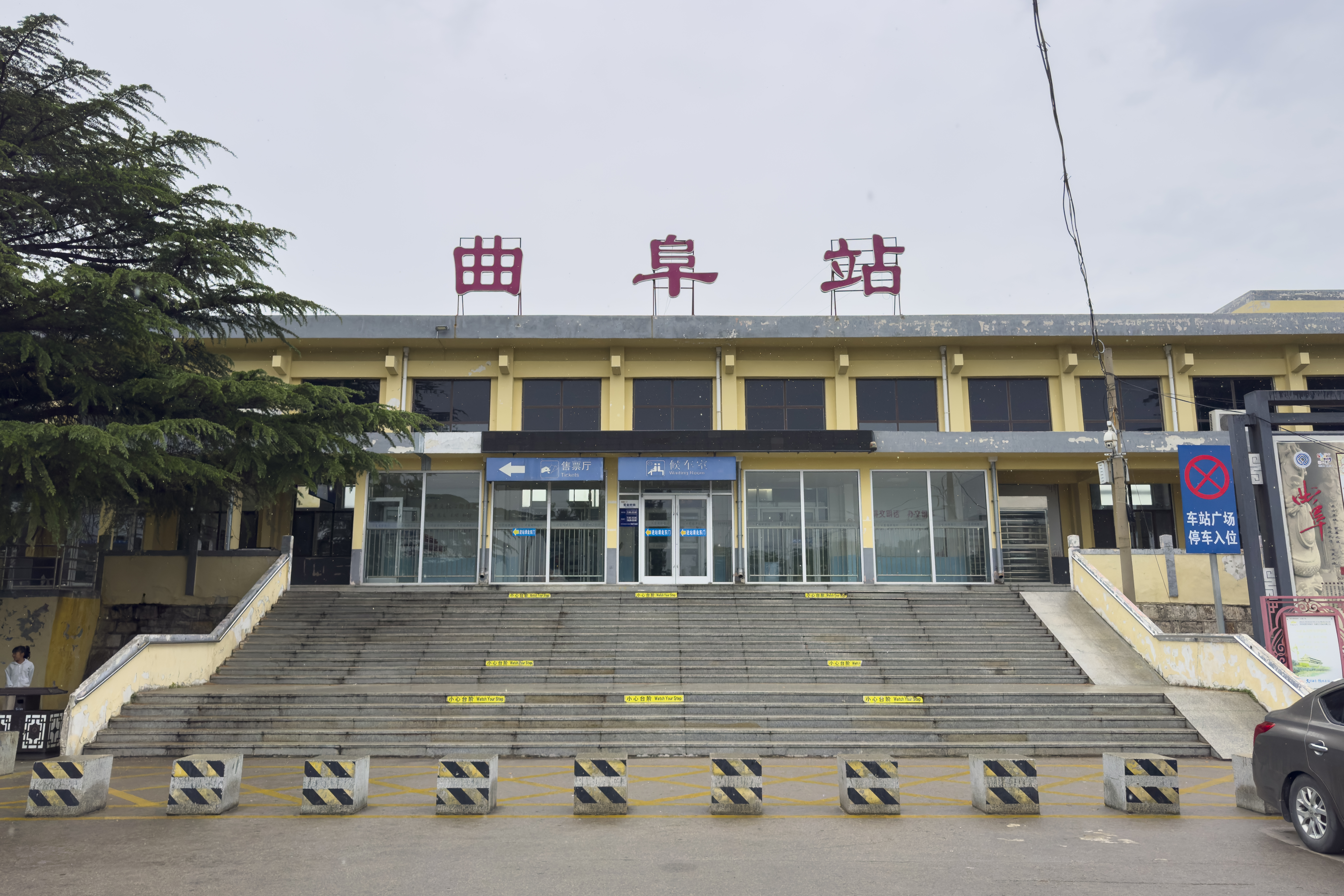
Qufu railway station

Qufu railway station is a railway station in Qufu, Jining, Shandong. It is on the Yanzhou–Shijiusuo railway. It was built in 1981 and is under the jurisdiction of China Railway Jinan Group. The station has three platforms and five tracks, but it is used less frequently than Qufu East Railway station, which offers high speed rail.

== See also ==
- Qufu East railway station

Preceding station	China Railway	Following station
Yanzhou Terminus	Yanzhou–Shijiusuo railway	Sishui towards Rizhao
