= Beijing–Shanghai high-speed train =

Railway service in China

Beijing–Shanghai high-speed train 京沪高速动车组列车
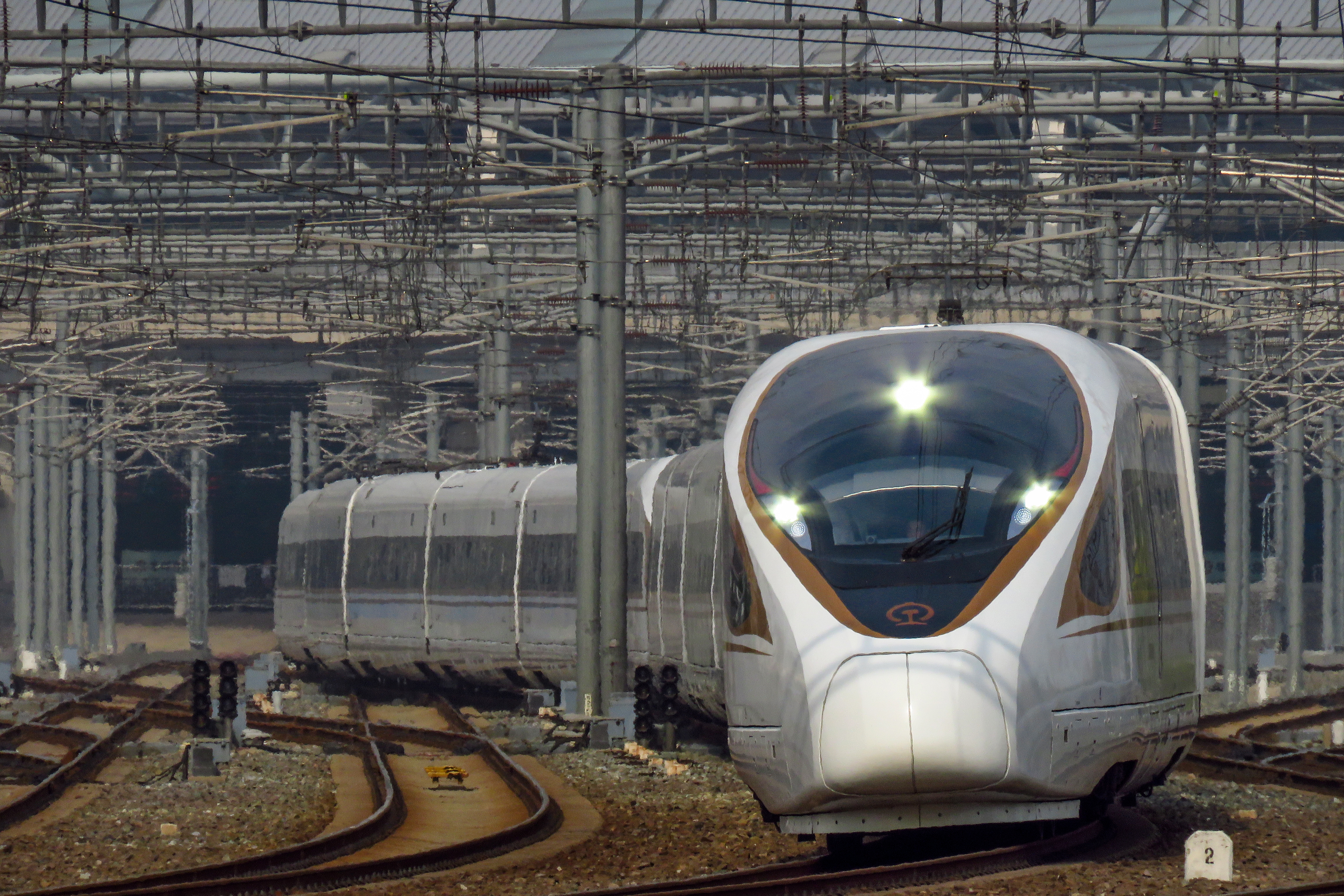
- A CR400BF EMU on G3 service

Overview
- Service type: G-series trains
- Status: Operational
- Locale: North and East China
- Predecessor: Beijing–Shanghai EMU trains
- First service: 30 June 2011
- Current operator(s): CR Beijing; CR Shanghai

Route
- Termini: Beijing South: Shanghai Hongqiao; Shanghai
- Distance travelled: 1,318 kilometres (819 mi)
- Average journey time: 4h 28m - 6h 24m
- Service frequency: 41 daily
- Train number(s): G1-18, G21/22, G101-160, G169/170, G411/412 (odd number for Shanghai-bound trains while even number for Beijing-bound trains)
- Line(s) used: Beijing–Shanghai HSR

On-board services
- Class(es): Business seat; First class seat; Second class seat
- Catering facilities: Dining car; Trolley refreshment service

Technical
- Rolling stock: CRH380BL, CRH380CL, CR400AF-B, CR400AF-BZ, CR400AF-BS, CR400BF-A, CR400BF-B, CR400BF-BZ
- Track gauge: 1,435 mm (4 ft 8 1/2 in)
- Operating speed: 350 km/h
- Track owner(s): Beijing-Shanghai High Speed Railway Co. Ltd.

The Beijing–Shanghai high-speed train (京沪高速动车组列车) are high-speed train services operated by CR Beijing and CR Shanghai on Beijing–Shanghai HSR in China. The services provide high-speed train connections between Beijing, the capital of China, and Shanghai, the economic center and largest city of the country. Currently, 41 pairs of G-series trains are operated daily.

== History ==
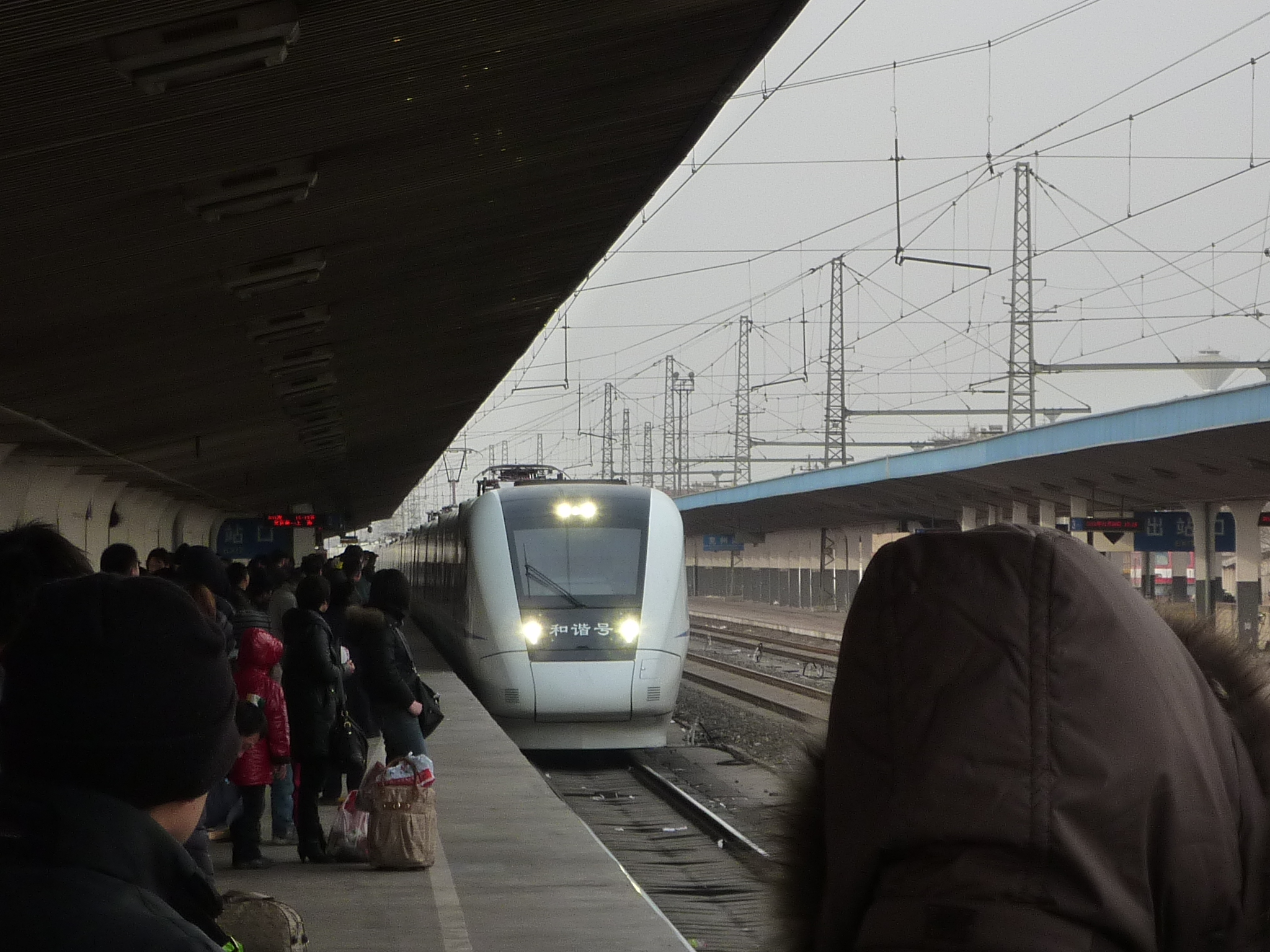
A CRH1B EMU on D31 service entering Yanzhou in 2011

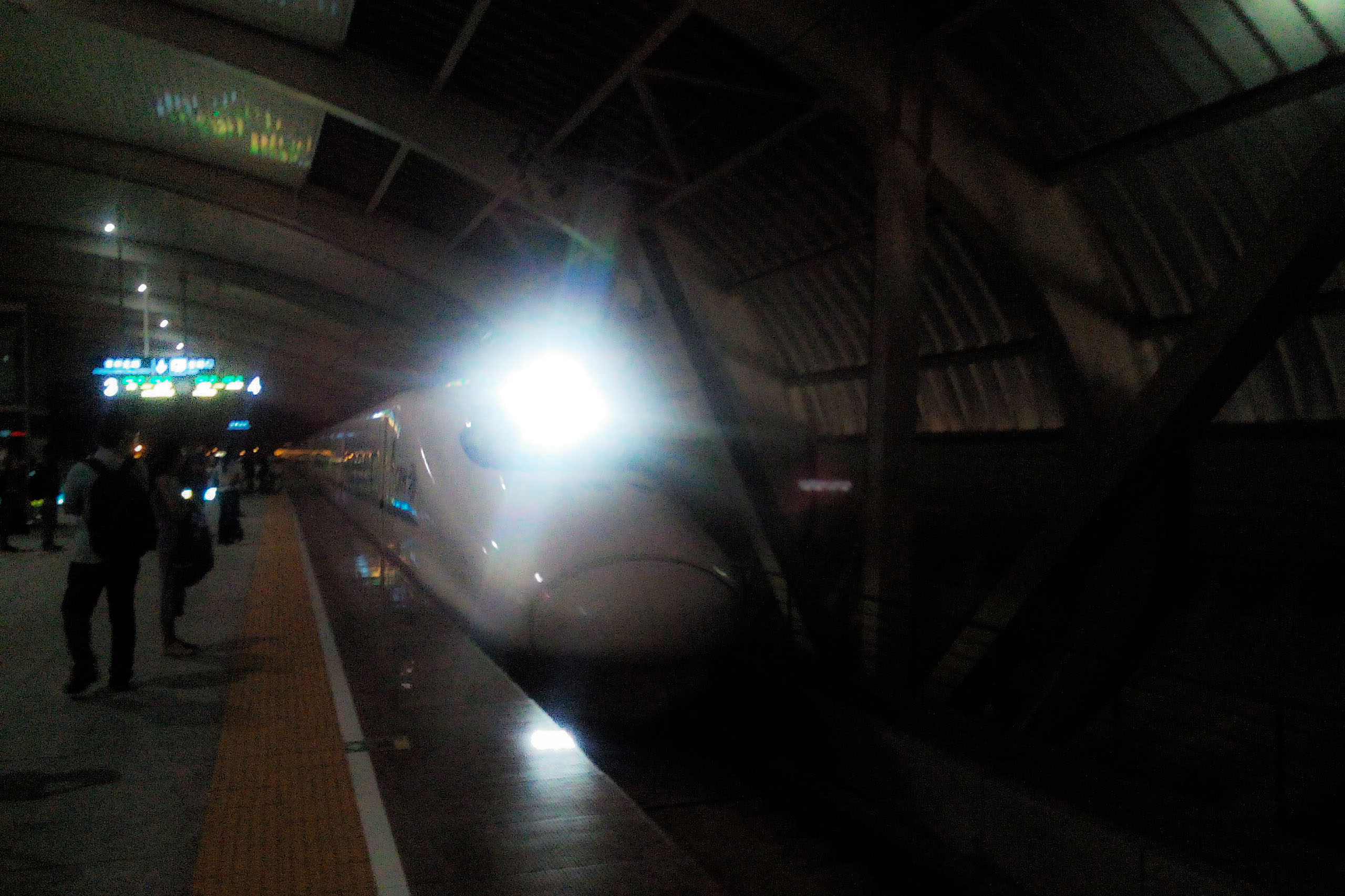
In September 2014, train D319 entered Changzhou North railway station

The CRH services between Beijing and Shanghai dates back to the sixth national railway speedup implemented on 18 April 2007, when the D31/32 trains began operation on the Beijing–Shanghai railway. The D32 train had a service time of 9h 59m, which was 2 hours shorter than the Z-series trains, and became the fastest train service between Beijing and Shanghai at that time. One more pair of trains were added to the service on 1 December 2009, under the train numbers D29/30.

On 18 April 2008, one year after the introduction of D-series trains, the Beijing–Shanghai HSR commenced construction. The HSR was inaugurated on 30 June 2011, with the faster G-series trains started operation on it. Some D-series train services were still kept, but were switched to operate on the new HSR. The day-time D-series trains were finally withdrawn from the service on 10 December 2014, with the D316 being upgraded to G412. The night-time D-series sleeper train services remain in operation.

On 26 June 2017, the China Standardized Fuxing EMUs made the debut commercial operation on this service.

== Operations ==
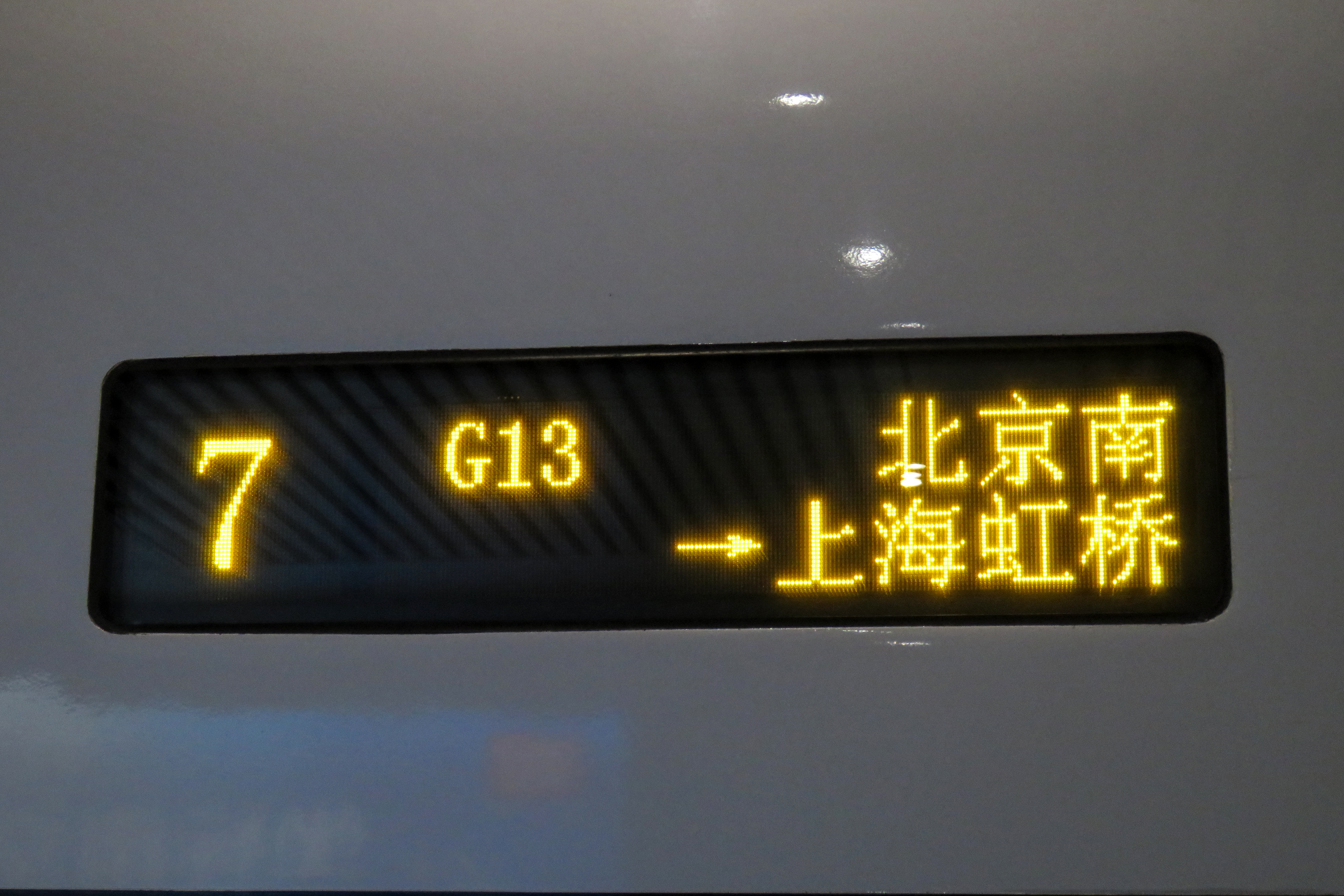
The display board outside a G13 train

G1-18 and G21/22 are faster services with fewer stops, with an average travelling time of about 4h 30m. G101-160 and G411/412 are services with more intermediate stops, and the travelling time varies from 5h 22m to 6h 24m.

== Rolling stocks ==
The fastest trains G1-28 use CR400AF-B/-BZ and CR400BF-B/-BZ trainsets. Regular service trains G101-162 use CR400AF-BS, CR400BF-A, CRH380BL and CRH380CL trainsets.

=== CRH380BL ===
2 types of CRH380BL trains with different formations are operated on the service. The EMUs with numbers CRH380BL-3501～3542 and CRH380BL-5501～5540 have the formation shown below.

Car No.	1	2	3	4	5	6-8	9	10-11	12	13-15	16
Type	ZYS; Business/first class	ZY; First class	SW; Business	ZY; First class	ZE; Second class	ZE; Second class	CA; Dining car	ZE; Second class	ZE; Second class	ZE; Second class	ZYS; Business/first class

CRH380BL EMUs with other numbers have the following formation.

Car No.	1	2-3	4	5	6-8	9	10-11	12	13-15	16
Type	ZYS; Business/first class	ZY; First class	ZE; Second class	ZE; Second class	ZE; Second class	CA; Dining car	ZE; Second class	ZE; Second class	ZE; Second class	ZYS; Business/first class

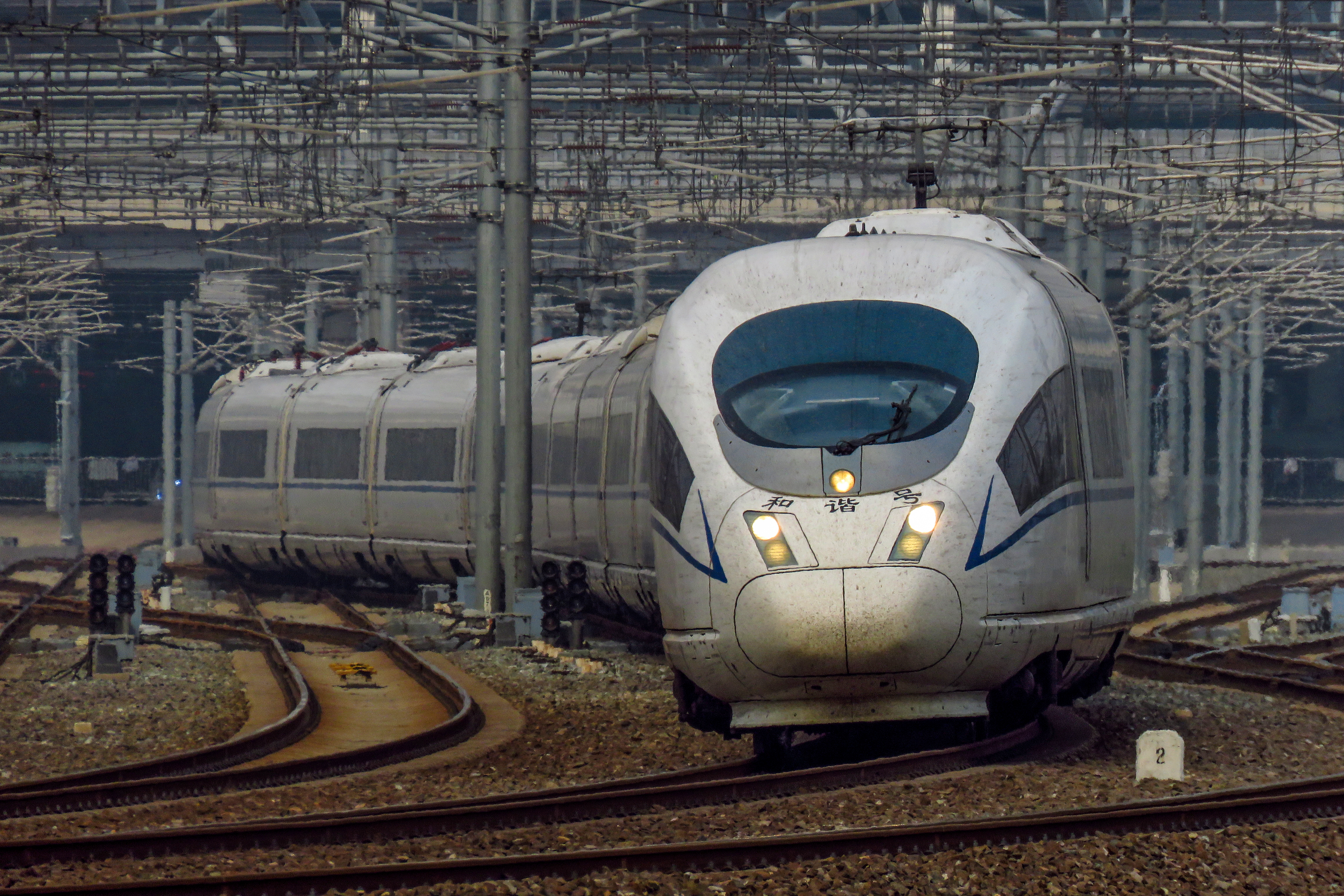
A CRH380BL EMU on G141 service

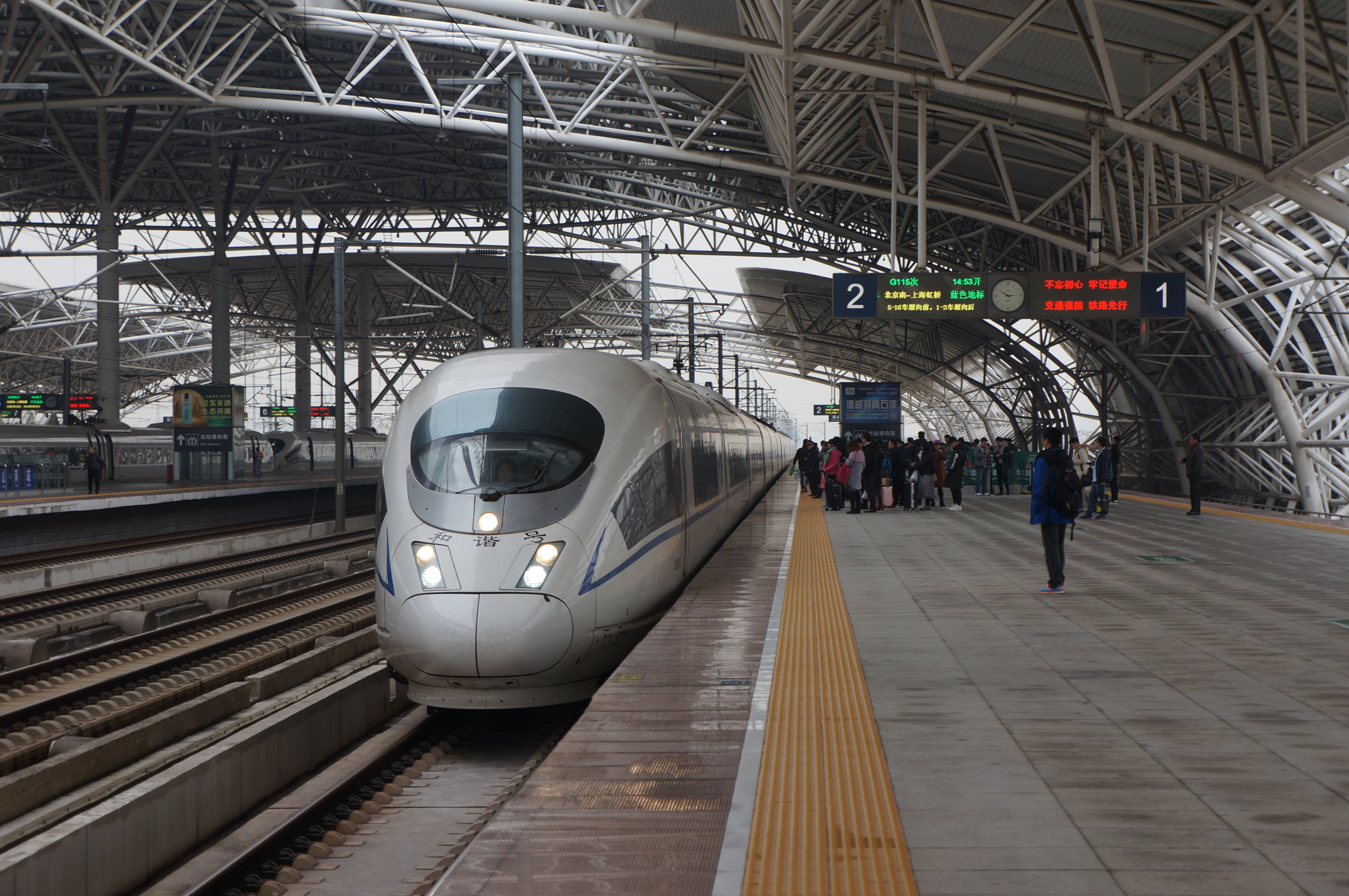
A CRH380BL EMU on G155 service entering Kunshan South

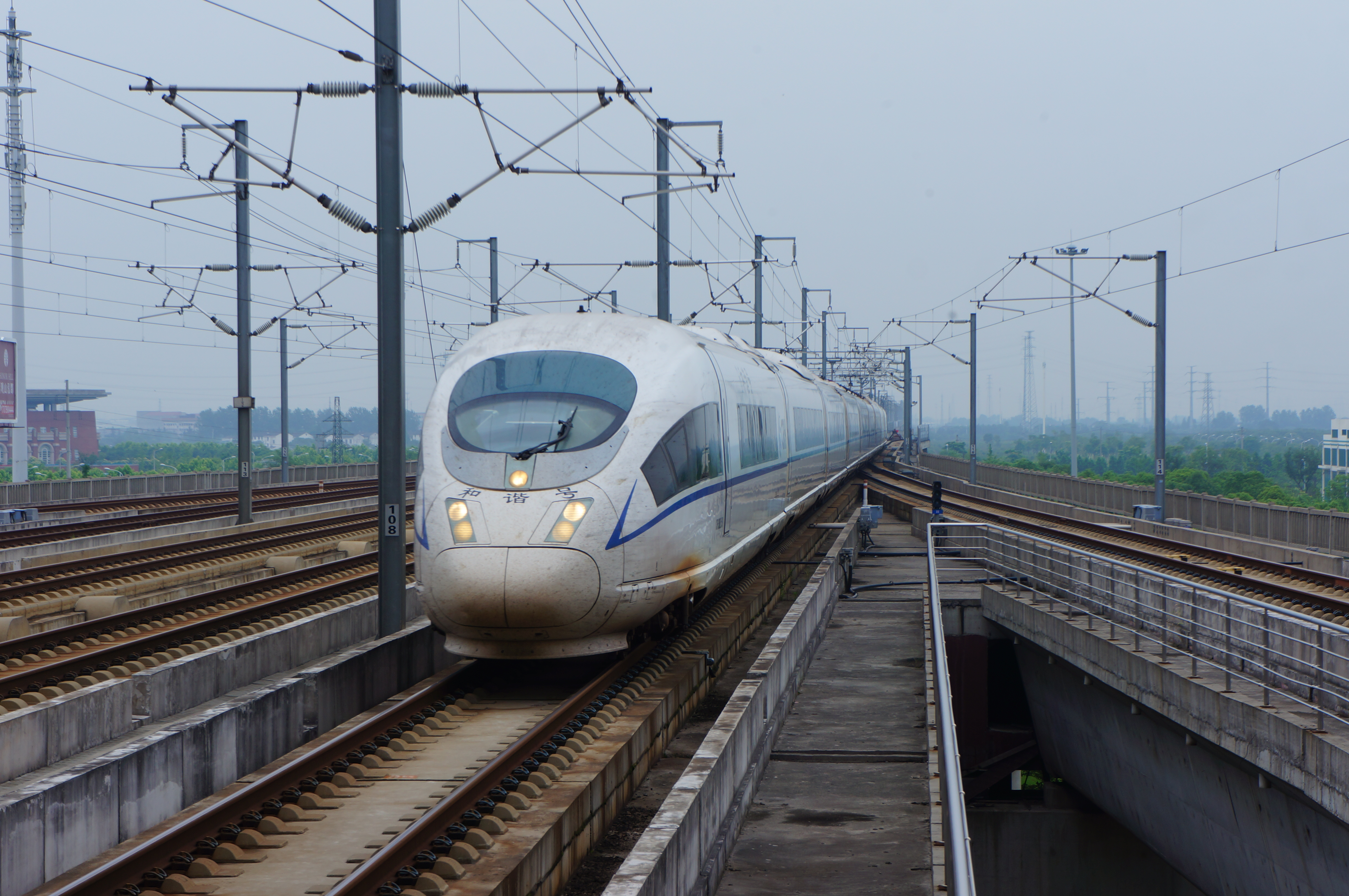
A CRH380BL EMU on G114 service entering Wuxi East

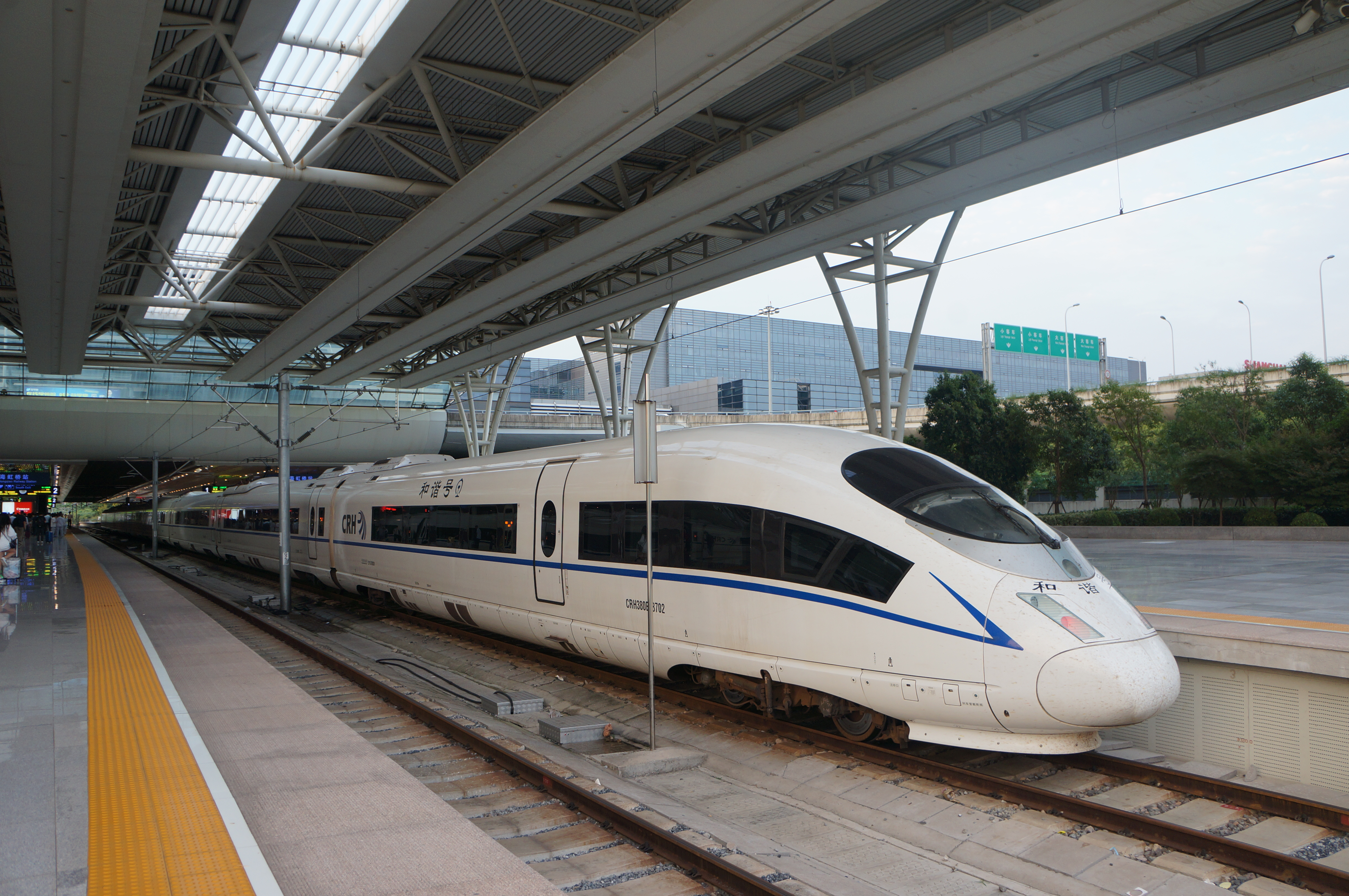
A CRH380BL EMU on G160 at Shanghai Hongqiao

=== CRH380CL ===
Car No.	1	2-3	4	5	6-8	9	10-11	12	13-15	16
Type	ZYS; Business/first class	ZY; First class	ZE; Second class	ZE; Second class	ZE; Second class	CA; Dining car	ZE; Second class	ZE; Second class	ZE; Second class	ZYS; Business/first class

The prototype trainset (CRH380CL-5601) has a different formation, as is shown below.

Car No.	1	2	3	4	5	6-8	9	10-11	12	13-15	16
Type	ZYS; Business/first class	ZY; First class	SW; Business	ZE; Second class	ZE; Second class	ZE; Second class	CA; Dining car	ZE; Second class	ZE; Second class	ZE; Second class	ZYS; Business/first class

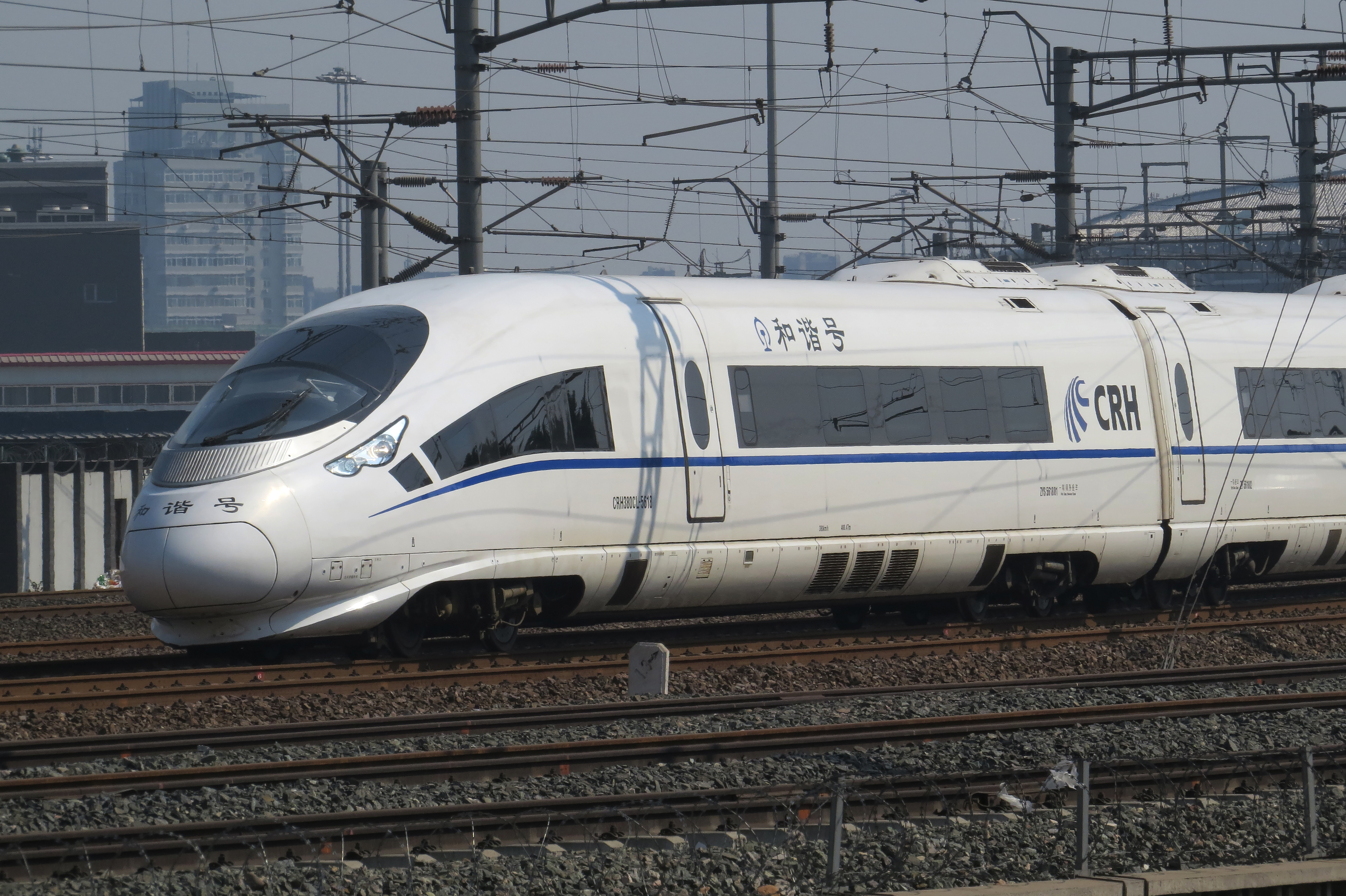
A CRH380CL EMU on G1 service

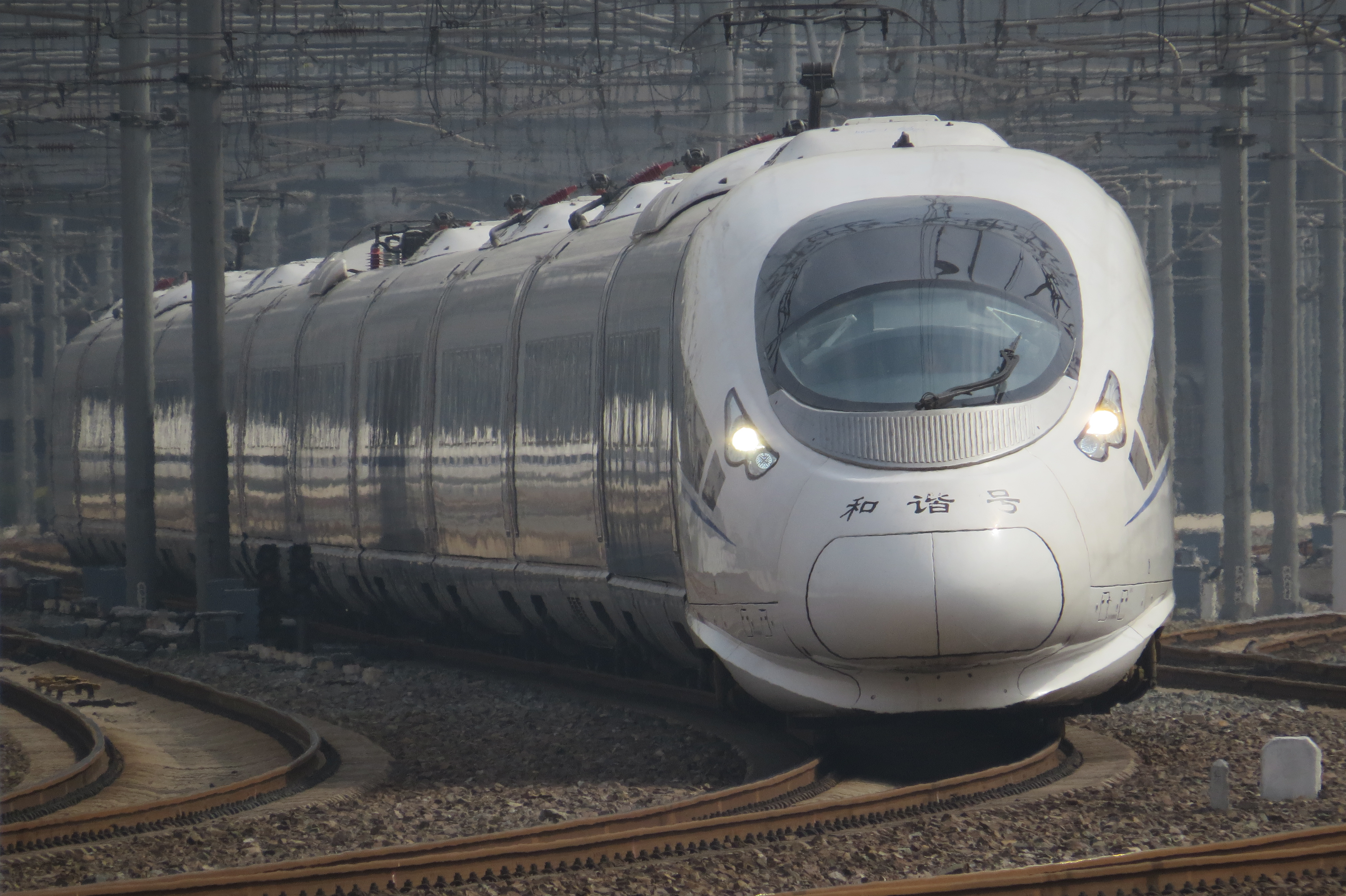
A CRH380CL EMU on G1 service

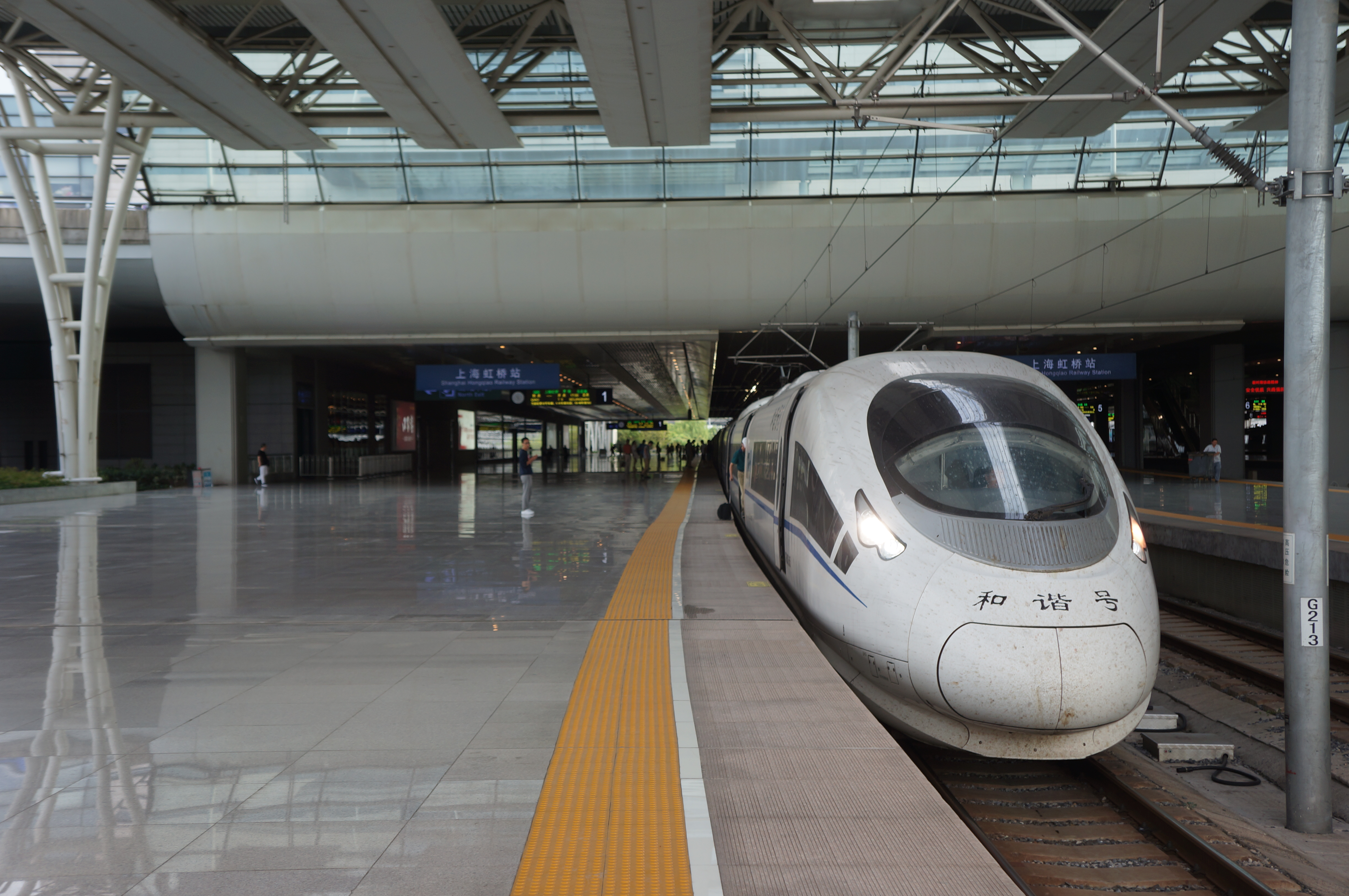
A CRH380CL EMU on G22 service at Shanghai Hongqiao

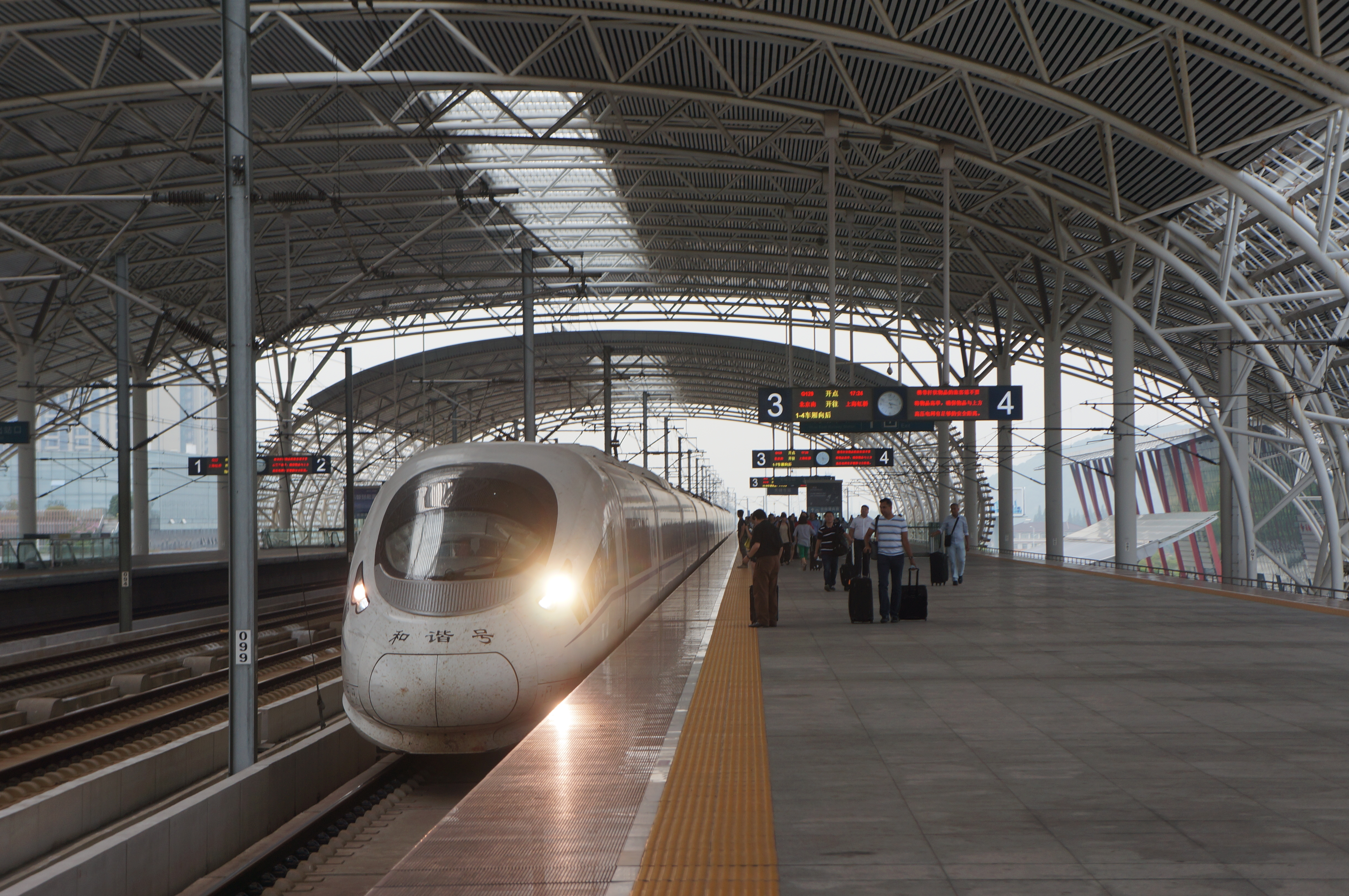
A CRH380CL EMU on G129 service entering Wuxi East

=== CR400BF-A ===
16-car CR400BF-A EMUs are operated on the service with the formation shown below.

Car No.	1	2	3-7	8	9	10-14	15	16
Type	SW; Business	ZY; First class	ZE; Second class	ZE; Second class	ZEC; Second class/dining car	ZE; Second class	ZY; First class	ZYS; Business/first class

=== CR400AF-B/-BZ and CR400BF-B/-BZ ===
17-car CR400AF-B/-BZ and CR400BF-B/-BZ EMUs are operated on the service with the formation shown below.

Car No.	1	2	3-7	8	9	10-15	16	17
Type	SW; Business	ZY; First class	ZE; Second class	ZE; Second class	ZEC; Second class/dining car	ZE; Second class	ZY; First class	ZYS; Business/first class

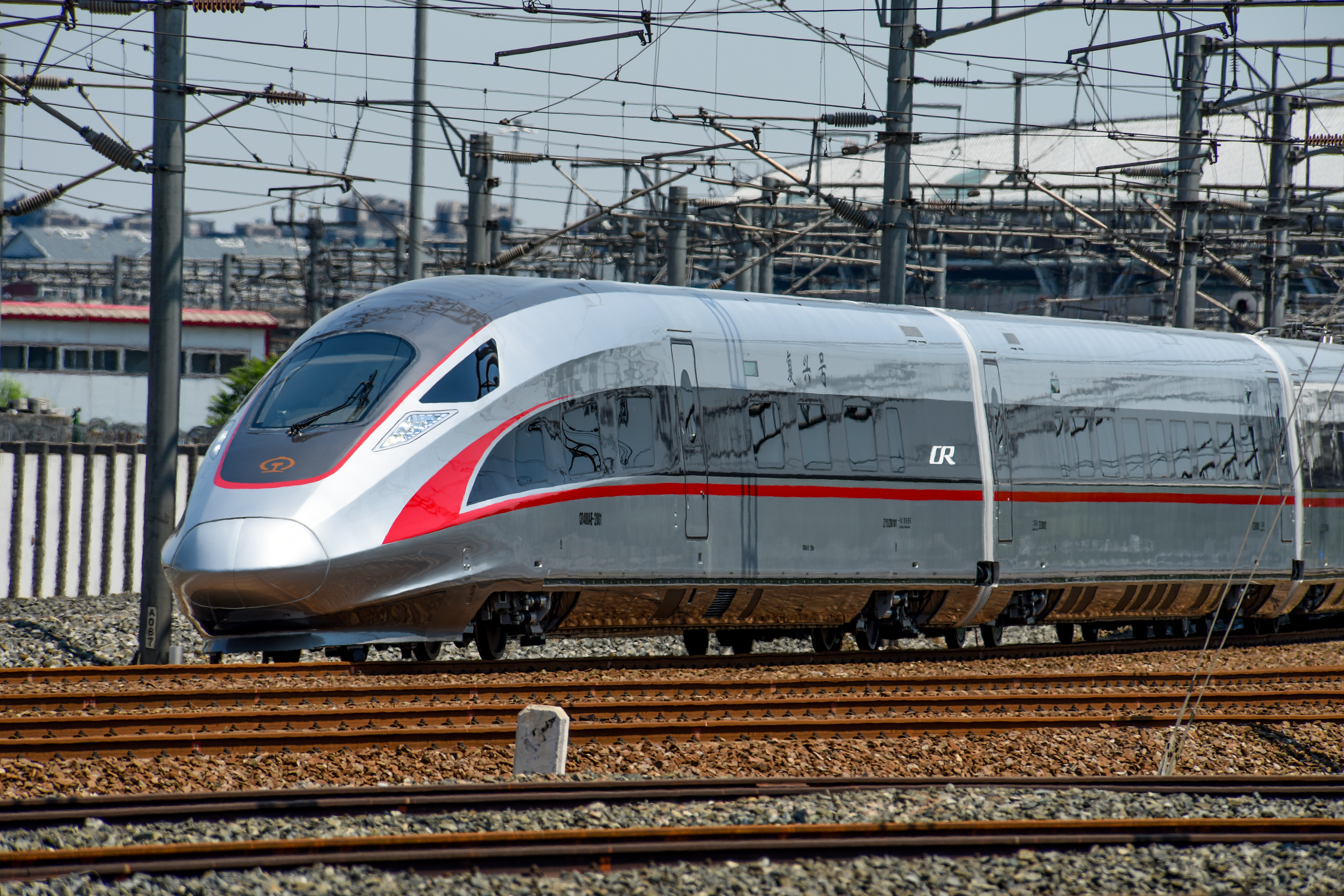
The debut commercial operation of Fuxing EMUs (on G123) on 26 Jun. 2017

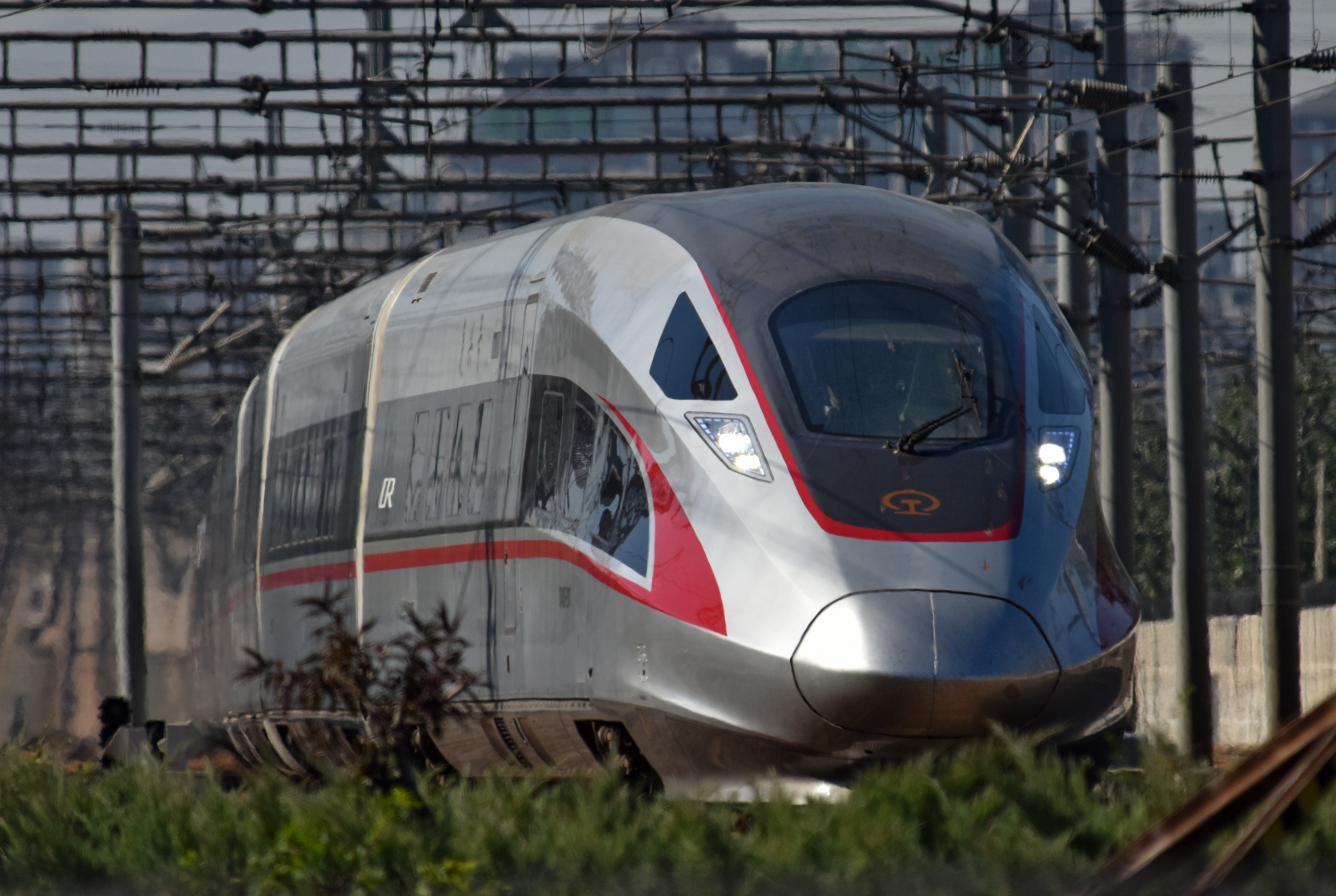
A CR400AF EMU on G6 service approaching Beijing South

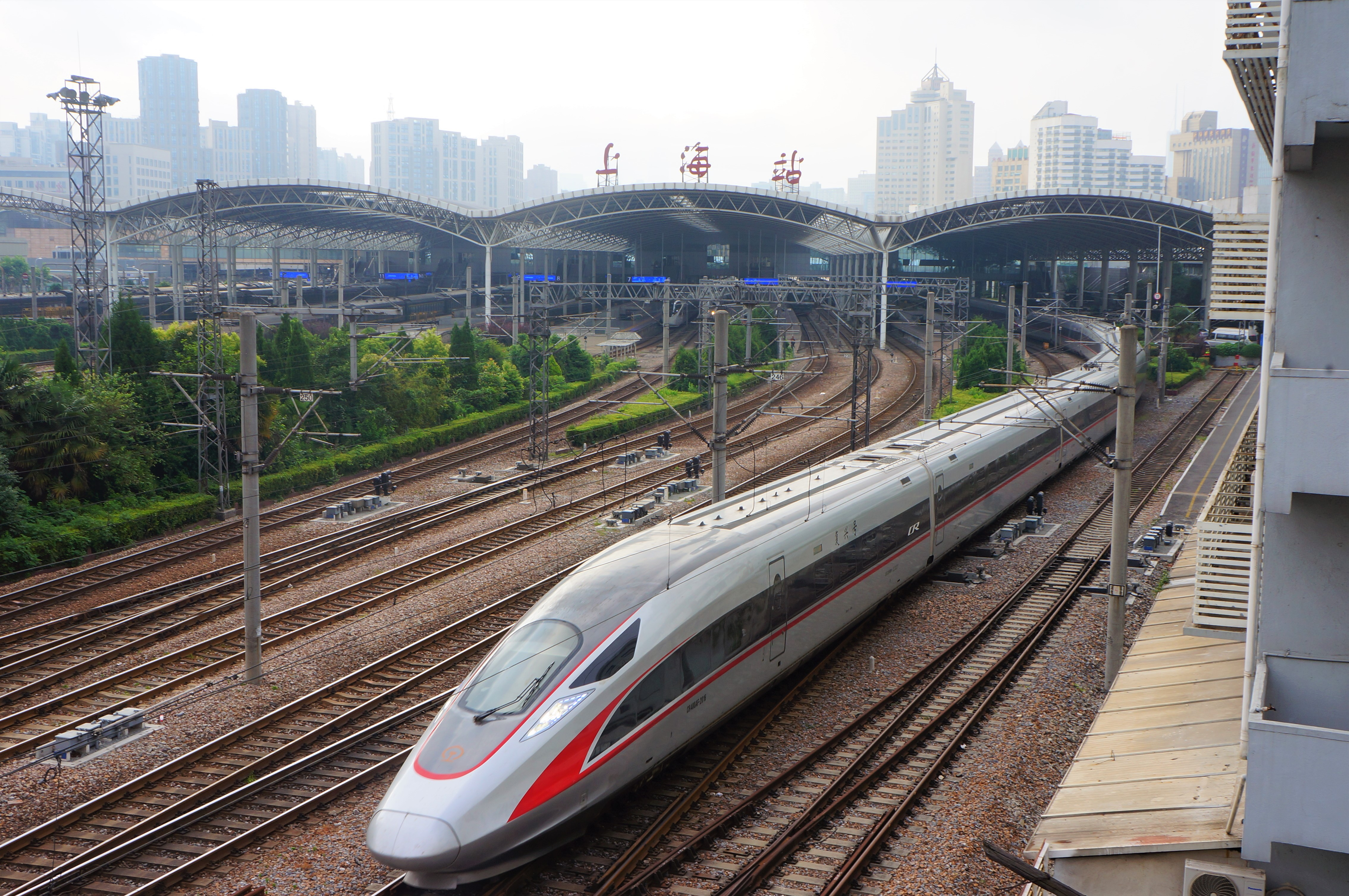
A CR400AF EMU on G6 service leaving Shanghai

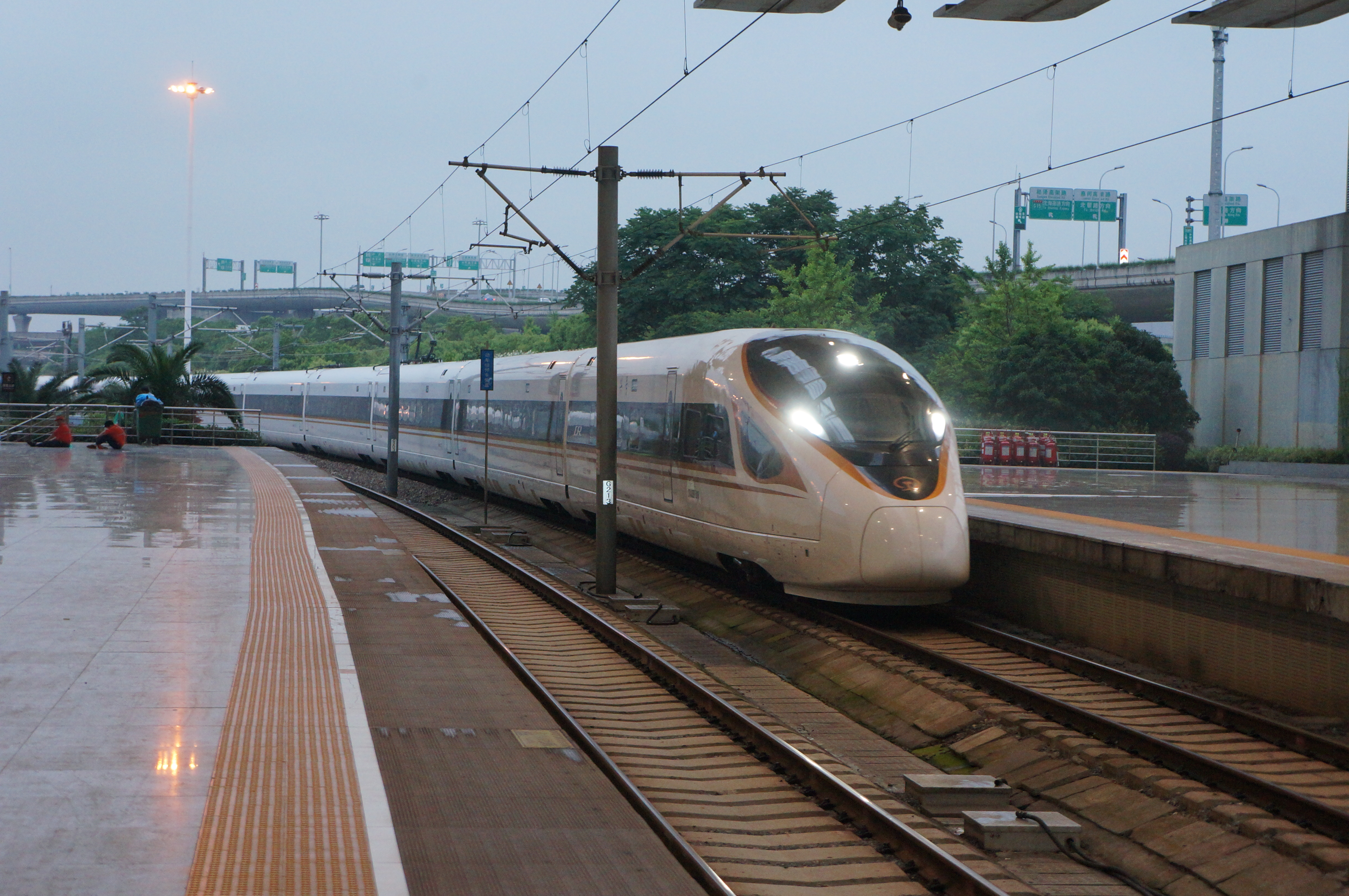
A CR400BF EMU on G3 service arriving at Shanghai Hongqiao

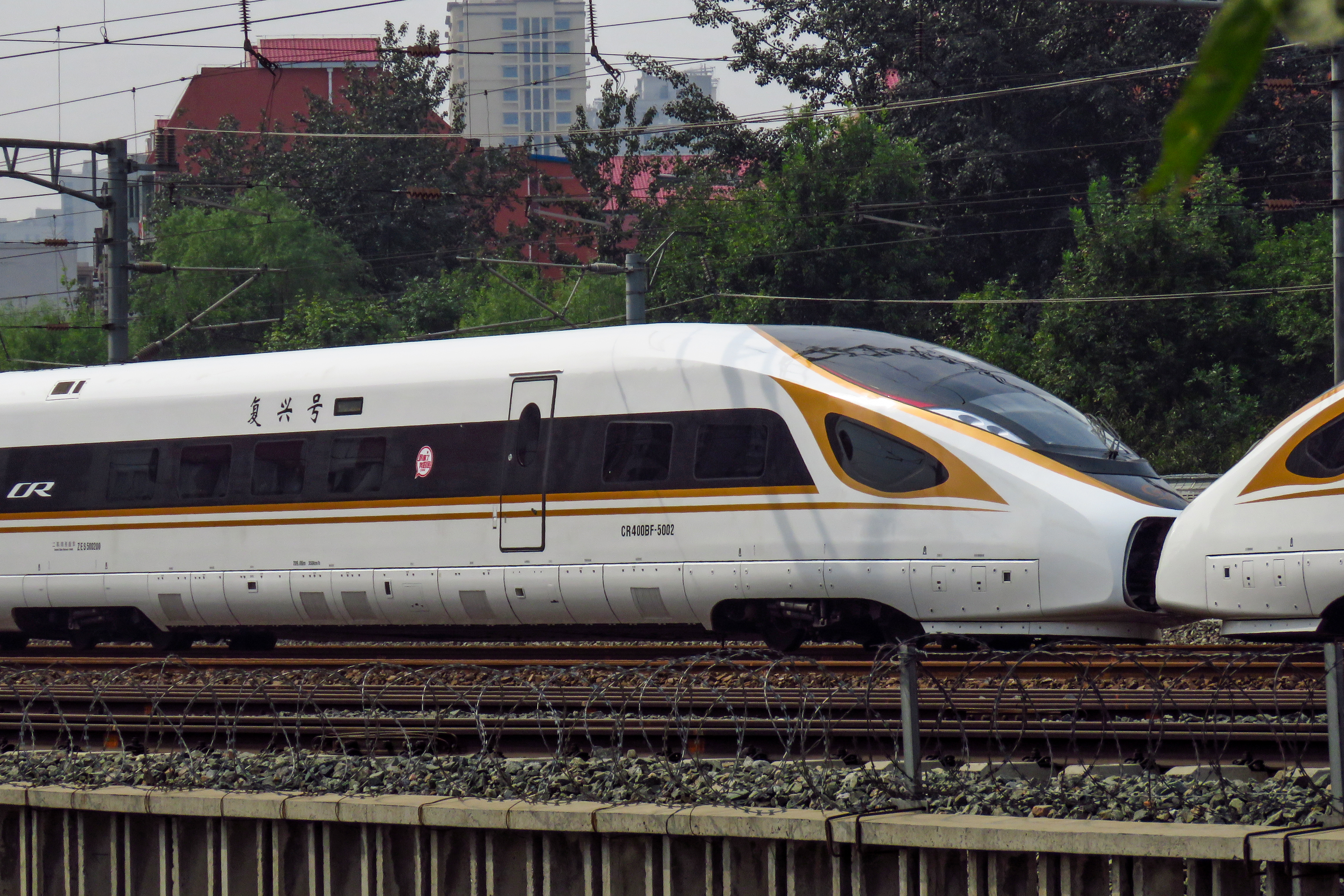
A double-headed CR400BF EMU on G2 service

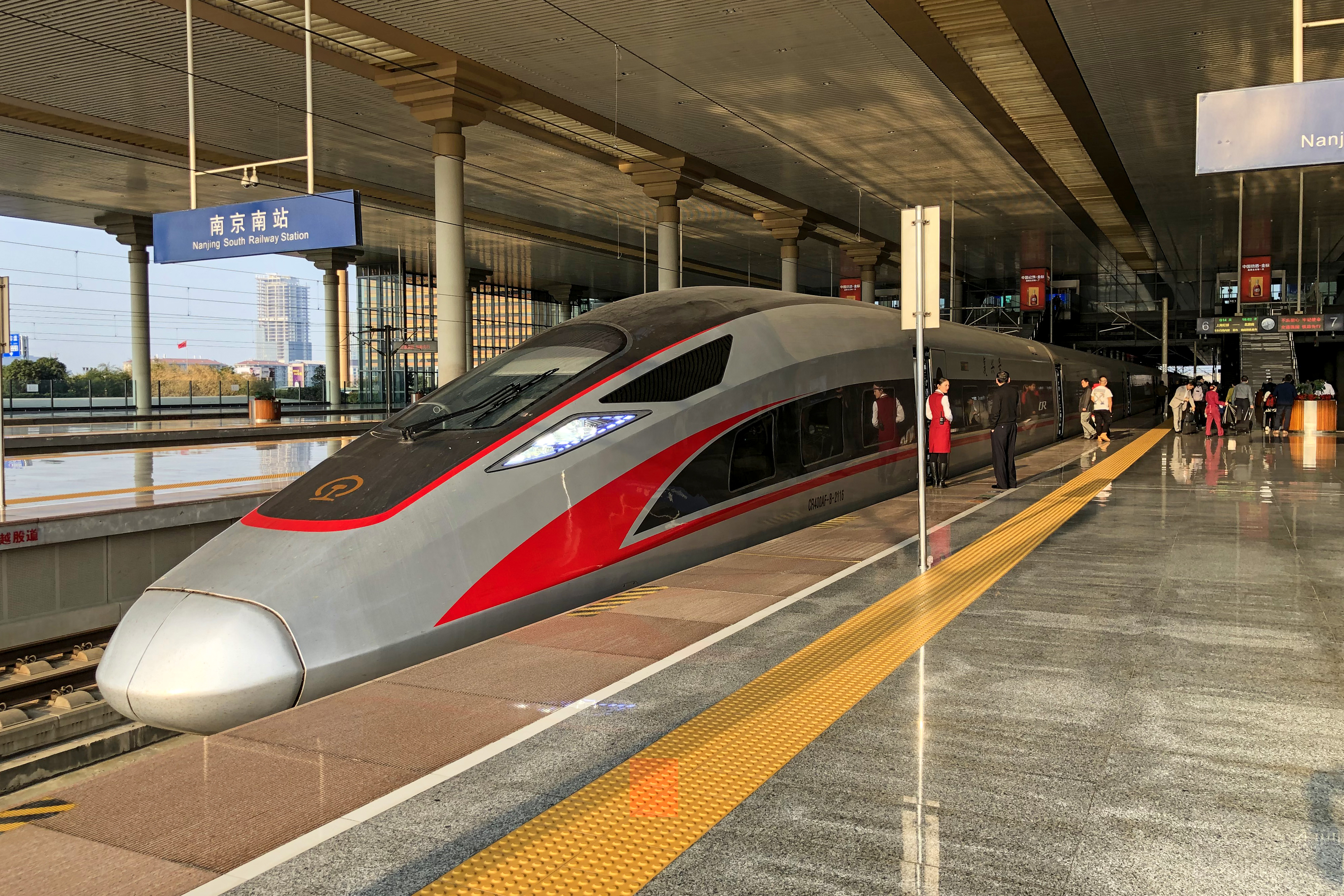
A CR400AF-B EMU on G14 train stops at Platform 6 of Nanjing South

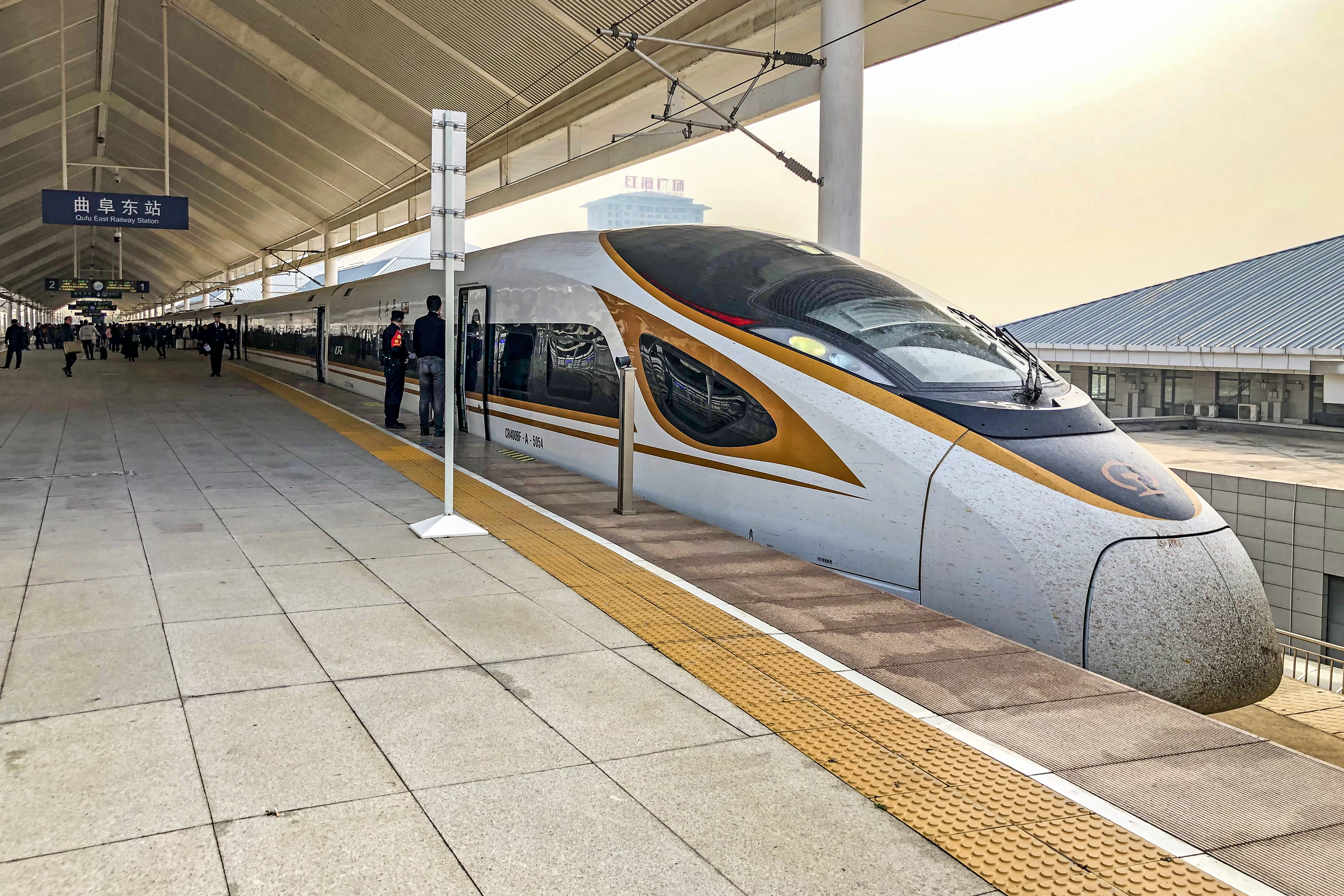
A CR400BF-A EMU on G124 train stops at Qufu East

=== Previously used rolling stocks ===
- CRH380AL
- CR400AF
- CR400BF
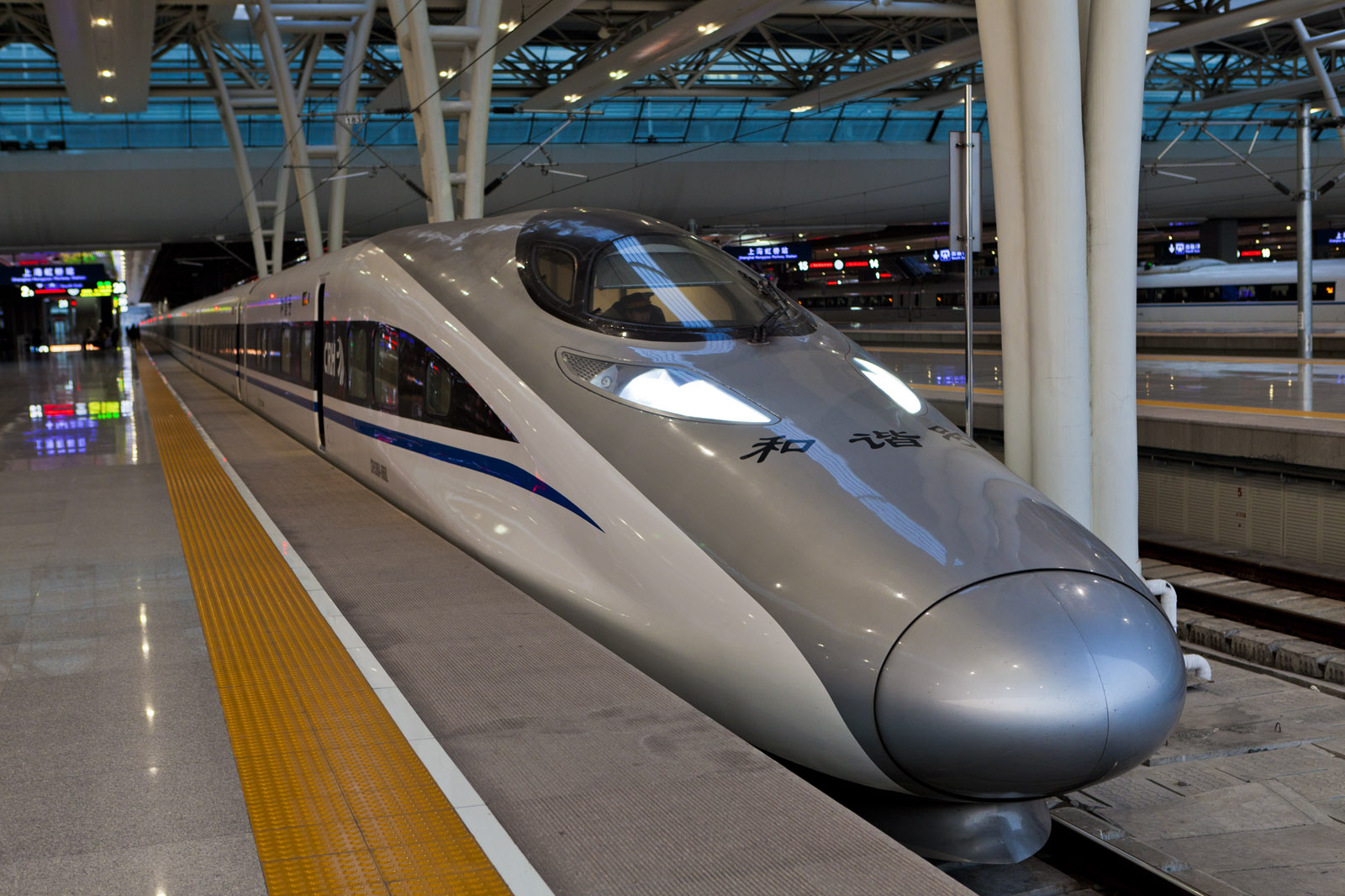
Beijing–Shanghai high-speed trains used to use CRH380A, and now CRH380AL occasionally serves as the intersection of Beijing–Shanghai high-speed trains.
