= Jining Rail Transit =

Chinese public transport system

Overview
- Locale: Jining, Shandong Province, China
- Transit type: Monorail

Operation
- Operation will start: 2022; 4 years ago (L6)

Jining Rail Transit
- Simplified Chinese: 济宁轨道交通
Transcriptions
Standard Mandarin
- Hanyu Pinyin: Jìníng Guǐdào Jiāotōng

Jining Rail Transit is a public transport system under construction in Jining, Shandong, China.

The first phase to be completed will be the Confucius and Mencius tourist line, which employs BYD SkyRail monorail technology. Trains will have a maximum speed of 80 km/h (50 mph). Originally, construction was scheduled to be completed by 2020, but due to the project lacking approval from the National Development and Reform Commission, its completion was delayed.

== Lines under construction ==
Line	Terminals		Commencement	Length km	Stations
L6	Qufu East railway station (Qufu)	Zoucheng South bus station (Zoucheng)	July 2017	37.5	14

== Planned lines ==
Line	Terminals		Length km	Stations
2	Jining West bus station (Rencheng District)	Ruiyuan Road (Rencheng District)	18.25	11
3	Huzhuang (Rencheng District)	Renxing Road (Rencheng District)	17.8	13
