= Xinxiang–Heze–Yanzhou–Rizhao railway =

Railway line in China

The Xinxiang–Heze–Yanzhou–Rizhao railway, also known as the Xinxiang–Shijiusuo or Xinshi railway, is the combined Xinxiang–Yanzhou and Yanzhou–Shijiusuo railways in Henan and Shandong Province of China.
