= QFD =

QFD may refer to:

- Quality function deployment
- Quantum flavordynamics
- Queensland Fire Department
- Question-focused dataset
- Boufarik Airport, Algeria (IATA: QFD)
- Qufu East railway station, China Railway pinyin code QFD
