= Yanzhou railway station =

Railway station in Jining, Shandong, China

Coordinates: 35.5563°N 116.8358°E

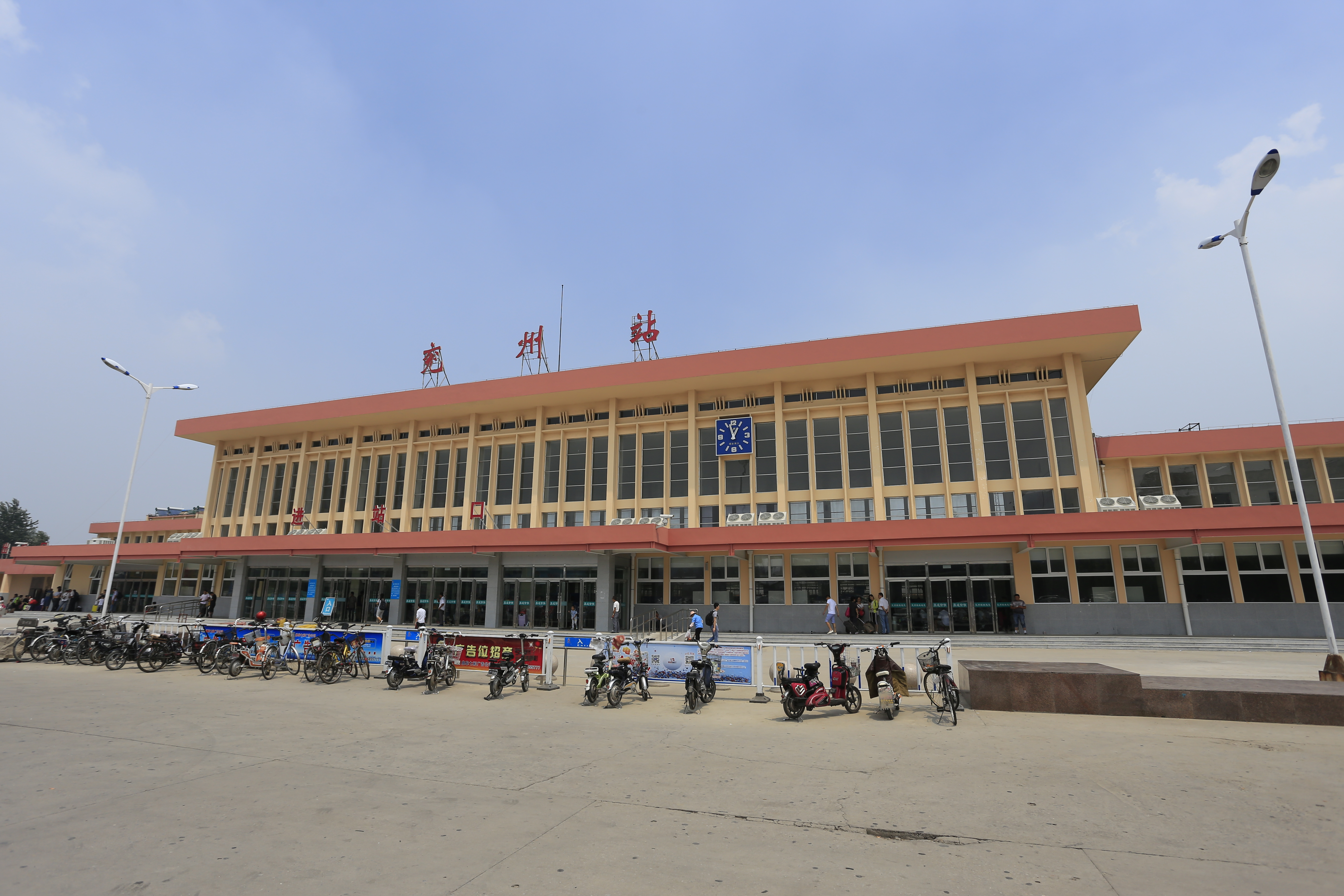

Yanzhou railway station is a first-class railway station in Yanzhou District, Jining, Shandong, China which serves three railways: Yanzhou–Shijiusuo railway, Beijing–Shanghai railway, and Xinxiang–Yanzhou railway. The station was built in July 1907, completed in August 1911 and has been operated since then. The total area of the waiting room is more than 3,400 square meters. The station has an average daily passenger flow of more than 10,000 people.

Preceding station	China Railway	Following station
Ciyao towards Beijing	Beijing–Shanghai railway	Zoucheng towards Shanghai
Terminus	Yanzhou–Shijiusuo railway	Qufu towards Rizhao
Jining towards Xinxiang	Xinxiang–Yanzhou railway	Terminus
