= Rizhao West railway station =

Railway station in Rizhao, Shandong, China

Rizhao West 日照西
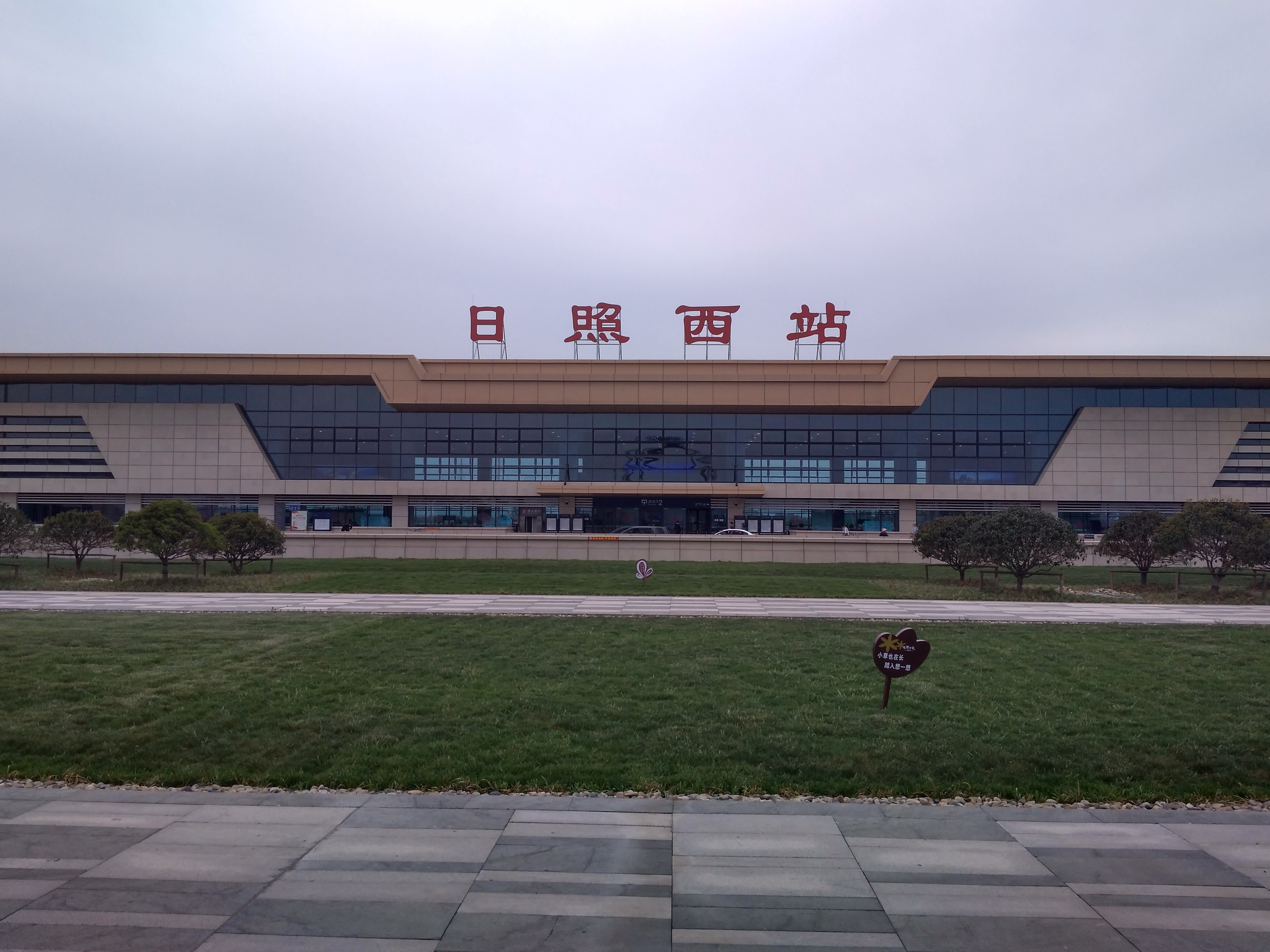

General information
- Location: Donggang District, Rizhao, Shandong; China
- Coordinates: 35.3903°N 119.4142°E
- Line(s): Yanzhou–Shijiusuo railway Qingdao–Yancheng railway Rizhao–Qufu high-speed railway

History
- Opened: 1985

Rizhao West railway station (Chinese: 日照西站) is a railway station located in Donggang District, Rizhao, Shandong, China.

== History ==
The station opened as Kuishan Town railway station in 1985. It was renamed Rizhao West on 1 July 2018. Services on the Qingdao–Yancheng railway began on 26 December 2018. Services on the Rizhao–Qufu high-speed railway began on 26 November 2019.

== See also ==
- Rizhao railway station

Preceding station	China Railway High-speed	Following station
Dongjiakou towards Qingdao North	Qingdao–Yancheng railway	Lanshan West towards Yancheng
Terminus	Rizhao–Qufu high-speed railway	Lijiazhai towards Qufu East
