= Zhengzhou–Xuzhou high-speed railway =

Railway line in China

Xuzhou–Lanzhou high-speed railway Zhengzhou–Xuzhou Section
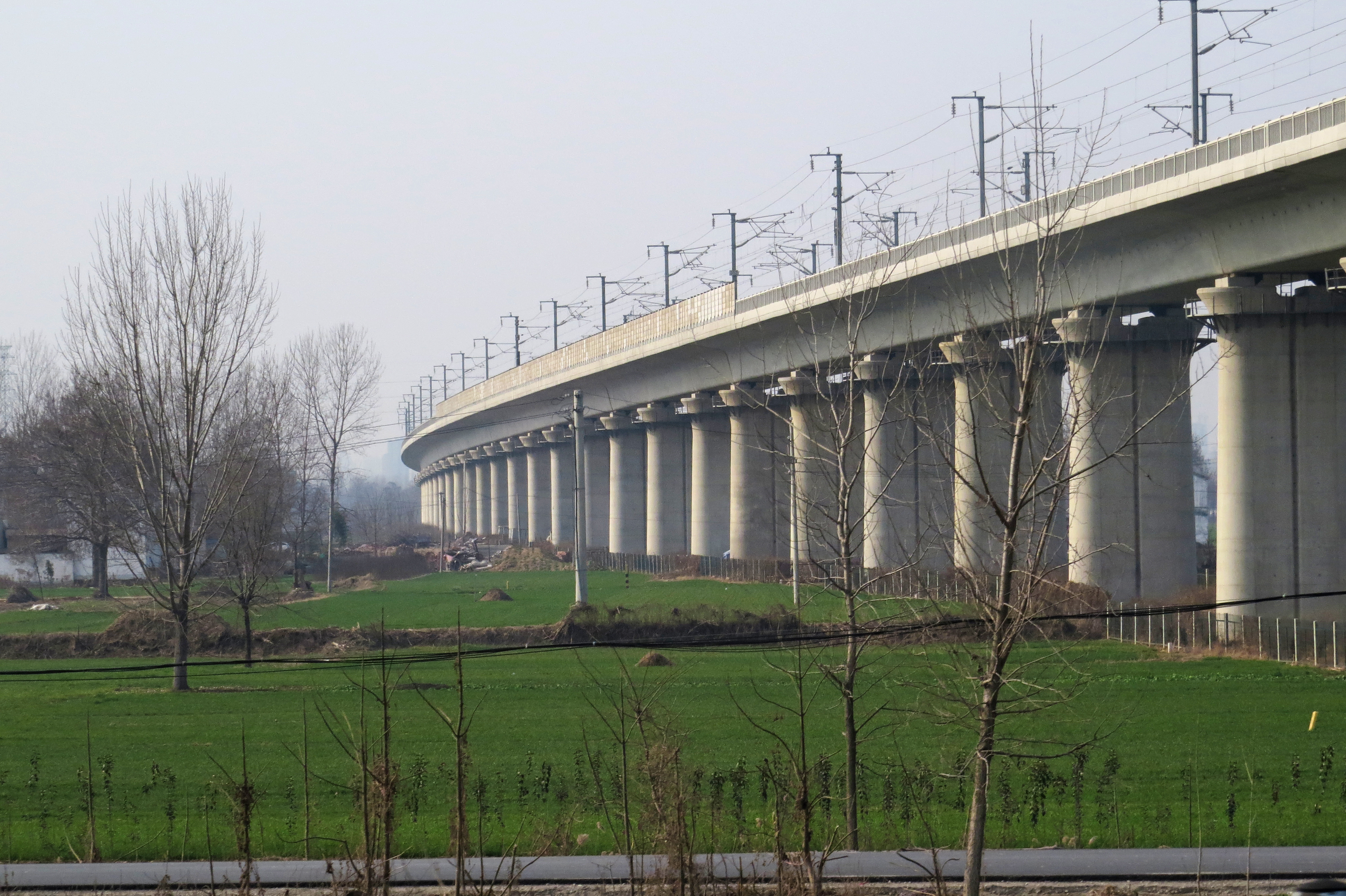
- The railway crossing G35 Expressway in Shangqiu, Henan

Overview
- Native name: 徐兰高速铁路郑徐段 郑徐客专 郑徐高铁
- Status: Operational
- Owner: CR Shanghai; CR Zhengzhou
- Locale: Henan province; Anhui province; Jiangsu province
- Termini: Zhengzhou East; Xuzhou East
- Stations: 9

Service
- Type: High-speed rail
- Operator(s): China Railway High-speed

History
- Opened: September 10, 2016

Technical
- Line length: 362 km (225 mi)
- Track gauge: 1,435 mm (4 ft 8 1/2 in) standard gauge
- Electrification: 25 kV 50 Hz AC (Overhead line)
- Operating speed: 350 km/h (217 mph)

Zhengzhou–Xuzhou high-speed railway
- Simplified Chinese: 郑徐高铁
- Traditional Chinese: 鄭徐高鐵
Transcriptions
Standard Mandarin
- Hanyu Pinyin: Zhèng-Xú Gāotiě
- IPA: [ɕǔ.lǎn káʊ.sû tʰjè.lû ʈʂə̂ŋ.ɕǔ twân]

Zhengzhou–Xuzhou Passenger Dedicated Line
- Simplified Chinese: 郑徐客运专线
- Traditional Chinese: 鄭徐客運專線
Transcriptions
Standard Mandarin
- Hanyu Pinyin: Zhèng-Xú Kèyùn Zhuān Xiàn
- IPA: [ʈʂə̂ŋ.ɕǔ kʰɤ̂.ŷn ʈʂwán ɕjɛ̂n]

Zhengzhou–Xuzhou high-speed railway, or Zhengxu Passenger Dedicated Line, is a high-speed rail line operated by China Railway Shanghai Group and China Railway Zhengzhou Group, connecting the cities of Zhengzhou, the provincial capital of Henan, and Xuzhou in northern Jiangsu.

The length of the railway is 362.39 kilometers and the investment is estimated to be CN¥48.62 billion. It is one of the segments of the Xuzhou-Lanzhou HSR Corridor, a high-speed railway corridor from Lanzhou to Xuzhou, paralleling the existing Longhai Railway. Presently, the existing conventional-speed Xuzhou-Zhengzhou railway is used e.g. by passenger trains traveling from Shanghai and Nanjing to Xi'an, Lanzhou, and points west.

Construction on the line began in December 2012, and running operations began on 10 September 2016.

== Stations ==
The railway line has nine stations:

- Zhengzhou East
- Kaifeng North
- Lankao South
- Minquan North
- Shangqiu
- Dangshan South
- Yongcheng North
- Xiaoxian North
- Xuzhou East
