= Lankao County =

Lankao County 兰考县
- County
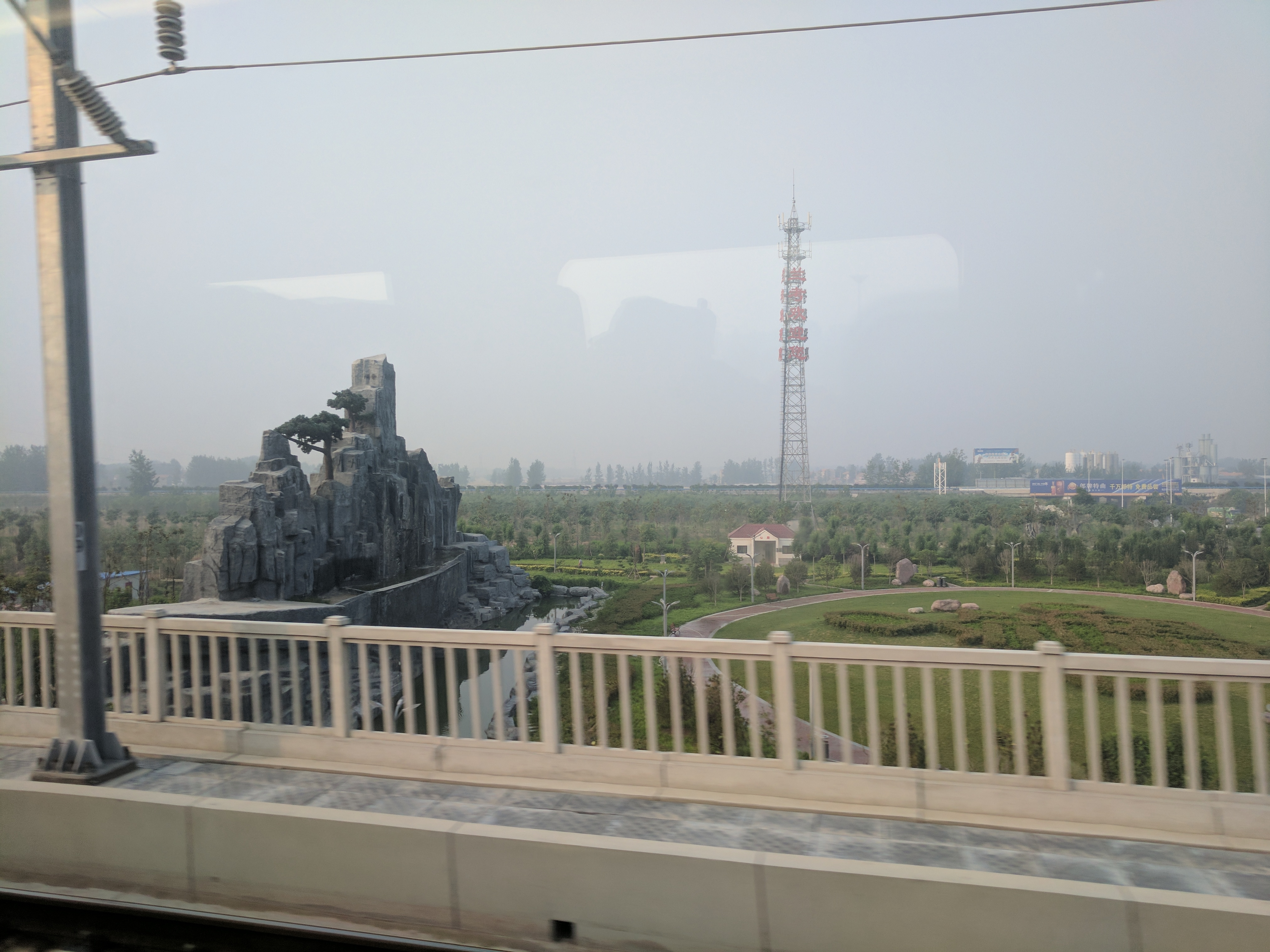
- Lankao Welcome Sign viewed from HSR

- Location of the seat in Henan
- Coordinates: 34°41′24″N 114°48′36″E
- Country: People's Republic of China
- Province: Henan
- Prefecture-level city: Kaifeng
- County seat: Chengguan (城关镇)

Area
  - Total: 1,116 km^{2} (431 sq mi)

Population (2019)
  - Total: 652,900
  - Density: 585.0/km^{2} (1,515/sq mi)
- Time zone: UTC+8 (China Standard)
- Postal code: 475300
- Area code: 0378
- Website: www.lankao.gov.cn

Lankao County (simplified Chinese: 兰考县; traditional Chinese: 蘭考縣; pinyin: Lánkǎo Xiàn) is a county of Kaifeng, Henan, China. It has an area of 1,116 km^{2} (431 sq mi) and a population of 760,000.

It was the site of the Battle of Lanfeng during the Second Sino-Japanese War.

== Administrative divisions ==
As of 2012, this county is divided to 5 towns and 11 townships.

Towns

- Chengguan (城关镇)
- Guyang (固阳镇)
- Hongmiao (红庙镇)
- Nanzhang (南彰镇)
- Zhangjunmu (张君墓镇)

Townships

- Batou Township (坝头乡)
- Chengguan Township (城关乡)
- Guying Township (谷营乡)
- Mengzhai Township (孟寨乡)
- Putaojia Township (葡萄架乡)
- Sanyizhai Township (三义寨乡)
- Xiaosong Township (小宋乡)
- Xuhe Township (许河乡)
- Yanlou Township (阎楼乡)
- Yifeng Township (仪封乡)
- Zhuaying Township (爪营乡)

== Climate ==
Climate data for Lankao, elevation 73 m (240 ft), (1991–2020 normals, extremes 1981–2010)
Month	Jan	Feb	Mar	Apr	May	Jun	Jul	Aug	Sep	Oct	Nov	Dec	Year
Record high °C (°F)	18.3 (64.9)	24.9 (76.8)	27.7 (81.9)	32.0 (89.6)	38.3 (100.9)	40.6 (105.1)	39.5 (103.1)	37.2 (99.0)	35.9 (96.6)	34.9 (94.8)	26.8 (80.2)	20.8 (69.4)	40.6 (105.1)
Mean daily maximum °C (°F)	5.1 (41.2)	9.2 (48.6)	15.1 (59.2)	21.4 (70.5)	27.0 (80.6)	31.9 (89.4)	32.1 (89.8)	30.6 (87.1)	27.0 (80.6)	21.8 (71.2)	13.8 (56.8)	7.1 (44.8)	20.2 (68.3)
Daily mean °C (°F)	0.2 (32.4)	3.7 (38.7)	9.3 (48.7)	15.6 (60.1)	21.2 (70.2)	26.0 (78.8)	27.4 (81.3)	25.9 (78.6)	21.5 (70.7)	15.7 (60.3)	8.3 (46.9)	2.1 (35.8)	14.7 (58.5)
Mean daily minimum °C (°F)	−3.5 (25.7)	−0.5 (31.1)	4.5 (40.1)	10.3 (50.5)	15.8 (60.4)	20.7 (69.3)	23.5 (74.3)	22.3 (72.1)	17.2 (63.0)	11.1 (52.0)	4.1 (39.4)	−1.6 (29.1)	10.3 (50.6)
Record low °C (°F)	−15.6 (3.9)	−14.8 (5.4)	−10.5 (13.1)	−1.0 (30.2)	4.8 (40.6)	11.1 (52.0)	16.5 (61.7)	11.0 (51.8)	6.0 (42.8)	−1.3 (29.7)	−12.4 (9.7)	−13.1 (8.4)	−15.6 (3.9)
Average precipitation mm (inches)	9.1 (0.36)	13.0 (0.51)	18.3 (0.72)	36.9 (1.45)	55.2 (2.17)	64.1 (2.52)	153.9 (6.06)	141.1 (5.56)	70.1 (2.76)	31.0 (1.22)	26.1 (1.03)	10.3 (0.41)	629.1 (24.77)
Average precipitation days (≥ 0.1 mm)	3.6	4.1	4.4	5.4	6.7	7.3	10.8	10.1	8.1	5.7	4.9	3.3	74.4
Average snowy days	3.7	3.2	1.2	0.2	0	0	0	0	0	0	0.9	2.5	11.7
Average relative humidity (%)	64	62	60	65	66	64	79	82	76	69	69	66	69
Mean monthly sunshine hours	121.6	134.6	176.2	199.7	216.1	199.3	177.3	171.4	158.6	158.4	138.4	126.9	1,978.5
Percentage possible sunshine	39	43	47	51	50	46	41	42	43	46	45	42	45
Source: China Meteorological Administration

== Transportation ==
- China National Highway 220
- Lankao South Railway Station
