= Minquan North railway station =

Railway station in Shangqiu, China

Minquanbei 民权北
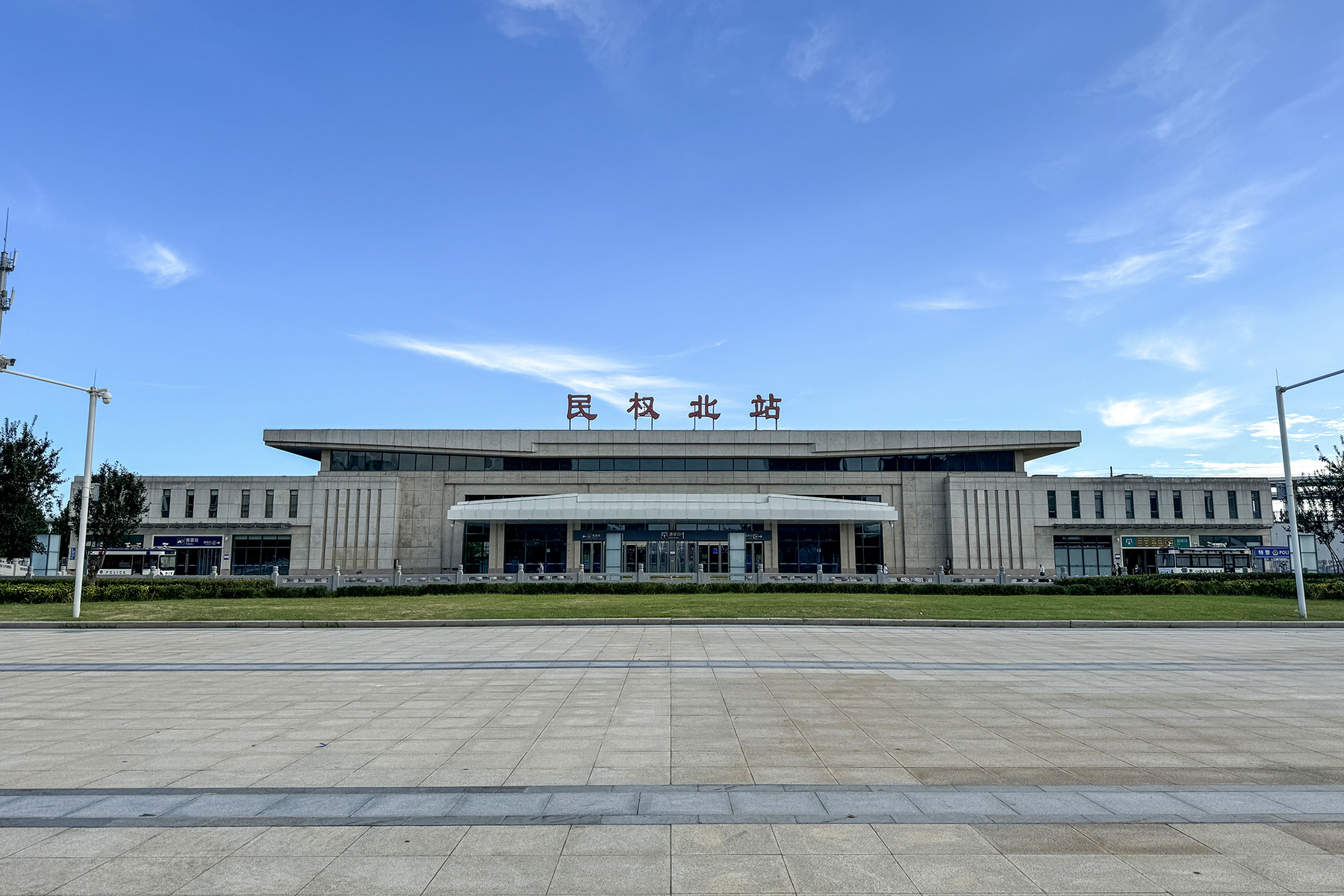

General information
- Other names: Minquan North
- Location: Minquan County, Shangqiu, Henan; China
- Coordinates: 34.6616°N 115.1479°E
- Operator: CR Zhengzhou
- Line: Zhengzhou–Xuzhou high-speed railway
- Platforms: 2
- Tracks: 4

Other information
- Station code: 38944 (TMIS code); MIF (telegraph code); MQB (Pinyin code)
- Classification: 2nd class station

History
- Opened: 10 September 2016

Services
Preceding station	China Railway High-speed	Following station
Shangqiu towards Xuzhou East	Xuzhou–Lanzhou high-speed railway	Lankao South towards Lanzhou West
Location

Minquan North railway station (Chinese: 民权北站) is a railway station on the Zhengzhou–Xuzhou section of the Eurasia Continental Bridge corridor in Minquan County, Shangqiu, Henan, China. The station started operation on 10 September 2016, together with the railway.

== Station Layout ==
2F	Side platform
2F	Platform 1	Xuzhou–Lanzhou high-speed railway towards Xuzhou East (Shangqiu) →
2F	Through track	Xuzhou–Lanzhou high-speed railway →
2F	Through track	← Xuzhou–Lanzhou high-speed railway
2F	Platform 2	← Xuzhou–Lanzhou high-speed railway towards Lanzhou West (Lankao South)
2F	Side platform
1F	Concourse	Ticket offices, waiting hall
