= Cao County =

Cao County 曹县
- County
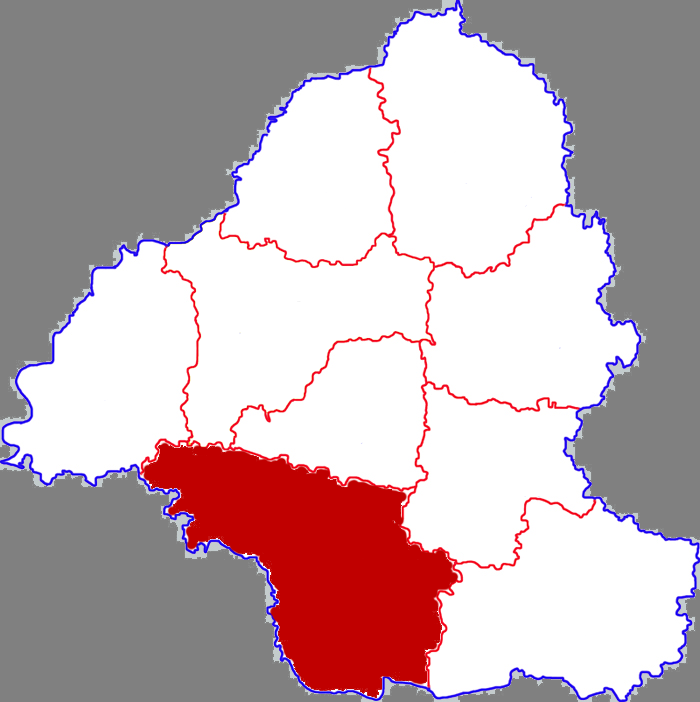
- Cao County in Heze

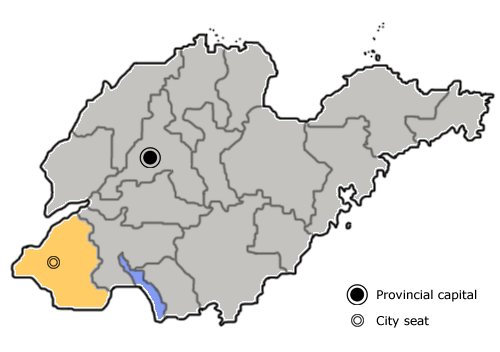
- Heze in Shandong
- Coordinates: 34°49′34″N 115°32′31″E
- Country: People's Republic of China
- Province: Shandong
- Prefecture-level city: Heze

Area
  - Total: 1,974 km^{2} (762 sq mi)

Population (2019)
  - Total: 1,421,200
  - Density: 720.0/km^{2} (1,865/sq mi)
- Time zone: UTC+8 (China Standard)
- Postal Code: 274400

Cao County
- Traditional Chinese: 曹縣
- Simplified Chinese: 曹县
Transcriptions
Standard Mandarin
- Hanyu Pinyin: Cáoxiàn
- Wade–Giles: Tsao Hsien

Cao County or Caoxian (simplified Chinese: 曹县; traditional Chinese: 曹縣; pinyin: Cáo Xiàn) is a county in Heze City in southwestern Shandong Province, China. It borders Henan Province to the west.

== History ==
Bo, one of the capitals of the Shang dynasty, lay in what is now Cao .

Prior to the Boxer Rebellion, Cao was an area noted for its lawlessness. When local garrisons were weakened during the First Sino-Japanese War, a militia known as the Dadaohui ("Great Sword Company") was set up. It operated until 1895 and may have inspired some of the Boxer Rebellion.

== Administrative divisions ==
As of 2012, this County is divided to 5 subdistricts, 19 towns, 1 ethnic town and 2 townships.

Subdistricts

- Caocheng Subdistrict (曹城街道)
- Panshi Subdistrict (磐石街道)
- Qinghe Subdistrict (青菏街道)
- Zhengzhuang Subdistrict (郑庄街道)
- Niji Subdistrict (倪集街道)

Towns

- Zhuangzhai (庄寨镇)
- Pulianji (普连集镇)
- Qingguji (青固集镇)
- Taoyuanji (桃源集镇)
- Hanji (韩集镇)
- Zhuanmiao (砖庙镇)
- Guyingji (古营集镇)
- Weiwan (魏湾镇)
- Suji (苏集镇)
- Sunlaojia (孙老家镇)
- Gedianlou (阎店楼镇)
- Liangditou (梁堤头镇)
- Ancailou (安才楼镇)
- Shaozhuang (邵庄镇)
- Wangji (王集镇)
- Qinggangji (青岗集镇)
- Changleji (常乐集镇)
- Daji (大集镇)
- Wulou (仵楼镇)

Ethnic Towns

- Houji Hui Town (侯集回族镇)

Townships

- Louzhuang Township (楼庄乡)
- Niuhongmiao Township (朱洪庙乡)

== Demographics ==
Cao County, under Heze City in Shandong Province, China, according to the latest statistics, had a population of 1,682,369. The county covers an area of approximately 1,970 square kilometers with a population density of 854 people per square kilometer. The population comprises mainly the Han Chinese ethnic group; however, it also has other ethnic groups. Cao County is an extensive agricultural producer from wheat and cotton to an expanding industrial base of manufacturing and textiles.

== Climate ==
Climate data for Caoxian, elevation 49 m (161 ft), (1991–2020 normals, extremes 1981–2010)
Month	Jan	Feb	Mar	Apr	May	Jun	Jul	Aug	Sep	Oct	Nov	Dec	Year
Record high °C (°F)	17.4 (63.3)	26.0 (78.8)	27.9 (82.2)	33.0 (91.4)	38.8 (101.8)	39.6 (103.3)	40.9 (105.6)	36.9 (98.4)	36.6 (97.9)	35.0 (95.0)	27.3 (81.1)	20.5 (68.9)	40.9 (105.6)
Mean daily maximum °C (°F)	5.1 (41.2)	9.0 (48.2)	15.0 (59.0)	21.5 (70.7)	26.8 (80.2)	31.6 (88.9)	32.0 (89.6)	30.5 (86.9)	27.0 (80.6)	21.8 (71.2)	13.9 (57.0)	7.1 (44.8)	20.1 (68.2)
Daily mean °C (°F)	0.0 (32.0)	3.4 (38.1)	9.0 (48.2)	15.3 (59.5)	20.8 (69.4)	25.6 (78.1)	27.3 (81.1)	25.9 (78.6)	21.4 (70.5)	15.5 (59.9)	8.1 (46.6)	1.9 (35.4)	14.5 (58.1)
Mean daily minimum °C (°F)	−3.7 (25.3)	−0.7 (30.7)	4.1 (39.4)	9.8 (49.6)	15.3 (59.5)	20.2 (68.4)	23.4 (74.1)	22.3 (72.1)	17.0 (62.6)	10.6 (51.1)	3.7 (38.7)	−1.8 (28.8)	10.0 (50.0)
Record low °C (°F)	−15.0 (5.0)	−17.6 (0.3)	−8.5 (16.7)	−1.7 (28.9)	3.4 (38.1)	12.2 (54.0)	15.7 (60.3)	11.6 (52.9)	6.4 (43.5)	−1.5 (29.3)	−11.5 (11.3)	−15.4 (4.3)	−17.6 (0.3)
Average precipitation mm (inches)	10.0 (0.39)	14.2 (0.56)	21.5 (0.85)	35.5 (1.40)	60.0 (2.36)	75.5 (2.97)	175.2 (6.90)	154.5 (6.08)	78.6 (3.09)	32.1 (1.26)	27.7 (1.09)	11.3 (0.44)	696.1 (27.39)
Average precipitation days (≥ 0.1 mm)	3.6	4.4	4.6	5.4	7.0	7.8	11.4	10.5	8.1	5.8	5.4	3.5	77.5
Average snowy days	3.4	2.4	0.7	0.1	0	0	0	0	0	0	0.7	1.9	9.2
Average relative humidity (%)	68	64	62	66	68	67	81	85	79	72	71	69	71
Mean monthly sunshine hours	133.5	143.1	187.8	209.3	228.9	209.7	188.4	182.5	170.9	168.1	146.9	139.3	2,108.4
Percentage possible sunshine	43	46	50	53	53	49	43	44	46	49	48	46	48
Source: China Meteorological Administration

== Transport ==
- Caoxian railway station
- Zhuangzhai railway station

== See also ==
- Caozhou
