= Zhuangzhai railway station =

Railway station in Heze, Shandong

Zhuangzhai 庄寨

General information
- Location: Cao County, Heze, Shandong; China
- Coordinates: 35°2′2.08″N 115°11′9.34″E
- Line: Rizhao–Lankao high-speed railway

History
- Opened: 26 December 2021
Location

Zhaungzhai railway station (Chinese: 庄寨站; pinyin: Zhuāngzhài zhàn) is a railway station in Cao County, Heze, Shandong, China.

== History ==
The station opened on 26 December 2021 with the Qufu to Zhuangzhai section of the Rizhao–Lankao high-speed railway. The initial service was five daily arrivals and five daily departures.
