= Rizhao–Lankao high-speed railway =

High speed railway line in China

Overview
- Status: Operational
- Owner: China Railway
- Locale: Shandong & Henan, China
- Termini: Zhuangzhai (Future: Lankao South); Rizhao
- Stations: 17

Service
- Type: High-speed railway
- Services: 1
- Operator(s): China Railway High-speed

History
- Opened: 26 November 2019

Technical
- Line length: 494 km (307 mi)
- Track gauge: 1,435 mm (4 ft 8 1/2 in)
- Electrification: 50 Hz 25 kV（AC）
- Operating speed: 350 km/h (217 mph)

The Rizhao–Lankao high-speed railway is a high-speed railway in Shandong and Henan, China.

== History ==
The initial section, from Rizhao to Qufu East, opened on 26 November 2019, connecting Rizhao on the Yellow Sea coast with Qufu, home of Confucius and a major tourist destination. The section from Qufu East to Zhuangzhai opened on 26 December 2021. The section from Zhuangzhai to Lankao South opened on 18 July 2024.

== Description ==
The total length of the route from Rizhao to Lankao will be 494 kilometres (307 mi).

The railway has a design speed of 350 km/h (217 mph). The railway starts from Rizhao West on the Qingdao–Yancheng railway, part of the Coastal corridor, a high-speed rail corridor running along the eastern coast of China. The railway heads inland to Qufu East on the Beijing–Shanghai high-speed railway thereby providing high-speed connections to a wide variety of destinations.

== Services ==
In November 2019, there were around ten trains per day in each direction along the line, the fastest time between the terminals is now 1 hour 14 minutes (trains G5589 and G5570) the slowest direct train on the line takes 1 hour and 53 minutes and stops at every station (train G5578). There are other trains that go the long way around between the stations, for example train G5528 goes from Linyi North to Rizhao West via Qufu, Jinan, Weifang and Qingdao taking 4 hours 35 minutes.

Whilst quite a few of the direct trains travel just between Rizhao and Qufu, there are numerous other direct trains which include this section of line, destinations available by direct trains include Qingdao, Zibo, Weihai, Yantai, Jinan and Tai'an.

== Stations ==
- Lankao South
- Zhuangzhai
- Heze East
- Juye North
- Jiaxiang North
- Jining North
- Jining East
- Qufu South
- Qufu East (via branch)
- Sishui South
- Mengshan
- Feixian North
- Linyi North
- Junan North
- Lijiazhai
- Rizhao West
- Rizhao
