= Xinxiang–Yanzhou railway =

Railroad in northern China

Overview
- Native name: 新兖铁路
- Locale: Henan, Shandong
- Termini: Xinxiang; Yanzhou
- Stations: 31

Service
- Operator(s): China Railway

History
- Opened: 1912–1985

Technical
- Line length: 305 km (190 mi)
- Number of tracks: 1
- Track gauge: 1,435 mm (4 ft 8 1/2 in)
- Electrification: 25 kV/50 Hz AC overhead catenary

The Xinxiang–Yanzhou railway or Xinyan railway (simplified Chinese: 新兖铁路; traditional Chinese: 新兖鐵路; pinyin: xīnyǎn tiělù), is a railroad in northern China between Xinxiang in Henan Province and Yanzhou in Shandong Province. The line, 305 km (190 mi) in length and built in sections from 1911–1912, 1979–1980 and 1983–1985, serves as a major conduit for the shipment of coal from Shanxi Province. Major cities and towns along route include Xinxiang, Heze, Jining and Yanzhou.

== History ==
The Xinxiang–Yanzhou railway was built in sections over three periods from 1911 to 1985. The Yanzhou-Jining section, 32.18 km (20 mi) in length, was built from 1911 to 1912 as a branch off of the Jinpu railway. This section was demolished in 1944 by Japanese occupying forces during World War II and rebuilt in 1958. The Jining-Heze section, 110.2 km (68 mi) in length, was built from 1979 to 1980. The Xinxiang-Heze section, 166.71 km (104 mi) in length, was built from 1983 to 1985. The Xinyan and the Yanzhou–Shijiusuo railway form a major conduit for the shipment of coal from Shanxi to the East China Sea. Collectively, these two railways are sometimes referred to as the Xinxiang–Shijiusuo or Xinxiang–Heze–Yanzhou–Rizhao railway.

== Rail connections ==
- Xinxiang: Beijing–Guangzhou railway, Xinxiang–Yueshan railway
- Heze: Beijing–Kowloon railway
- Yanzhou: Beijing–Shanghai railway, Yanzhou–Shijiusuo railway

== See also ==
- List of railways in China
