= Lankao South railway station =

Railway station in Kaifeng, China

Lankaonan 兰考南
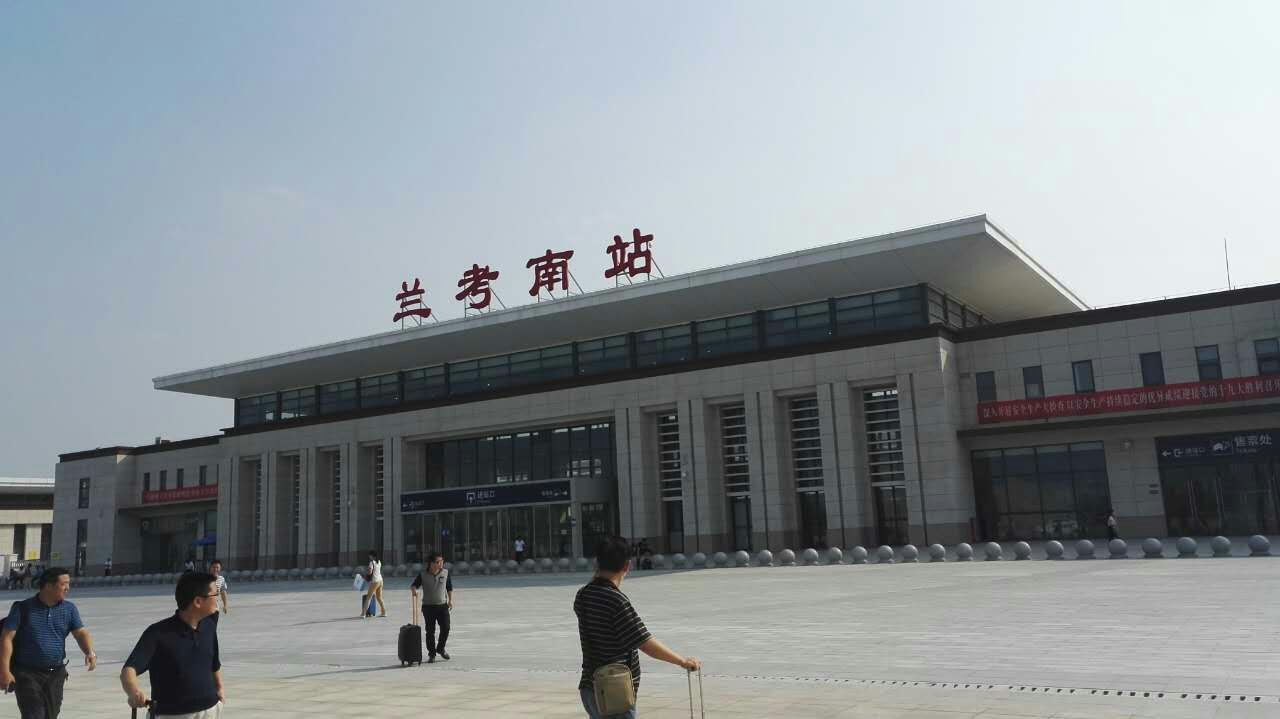

General information
- Other names: Lankao South
- Location: Lankao County, Kaifeng, Henan; China
- Coordinates: 34.7714°N 114.8181°E
- Operator: CR Zhengzhou
- Lines: Xuzhou–Lanzhou High-Speed Railway, Rizhao–Lankao high-speed railway (U/C)
- Platforms: 2
- Tracks: 4

Other information
- Station code: 38946 (TMIS code); LUF (telegraph code); LKN (Pinyin code)

History
- Opened: 10 September 2016

Services
Preceding station	China Railway High-speed	Following station
Minquan North towards Xuzhou East	Xuzhou–Lanzhou high-speed railway	Kaifeng North towards Lanzhou West
Location

Lankao South railway station is a railway station on the Zhengzhou–Xuzhou high-speed railway in Lankao County, Kaifeng, Henan, China. The station started operations on 10 September 2016.
