= Rizhao railway station =

Railway station in Hebei, China

Rizhao 日照
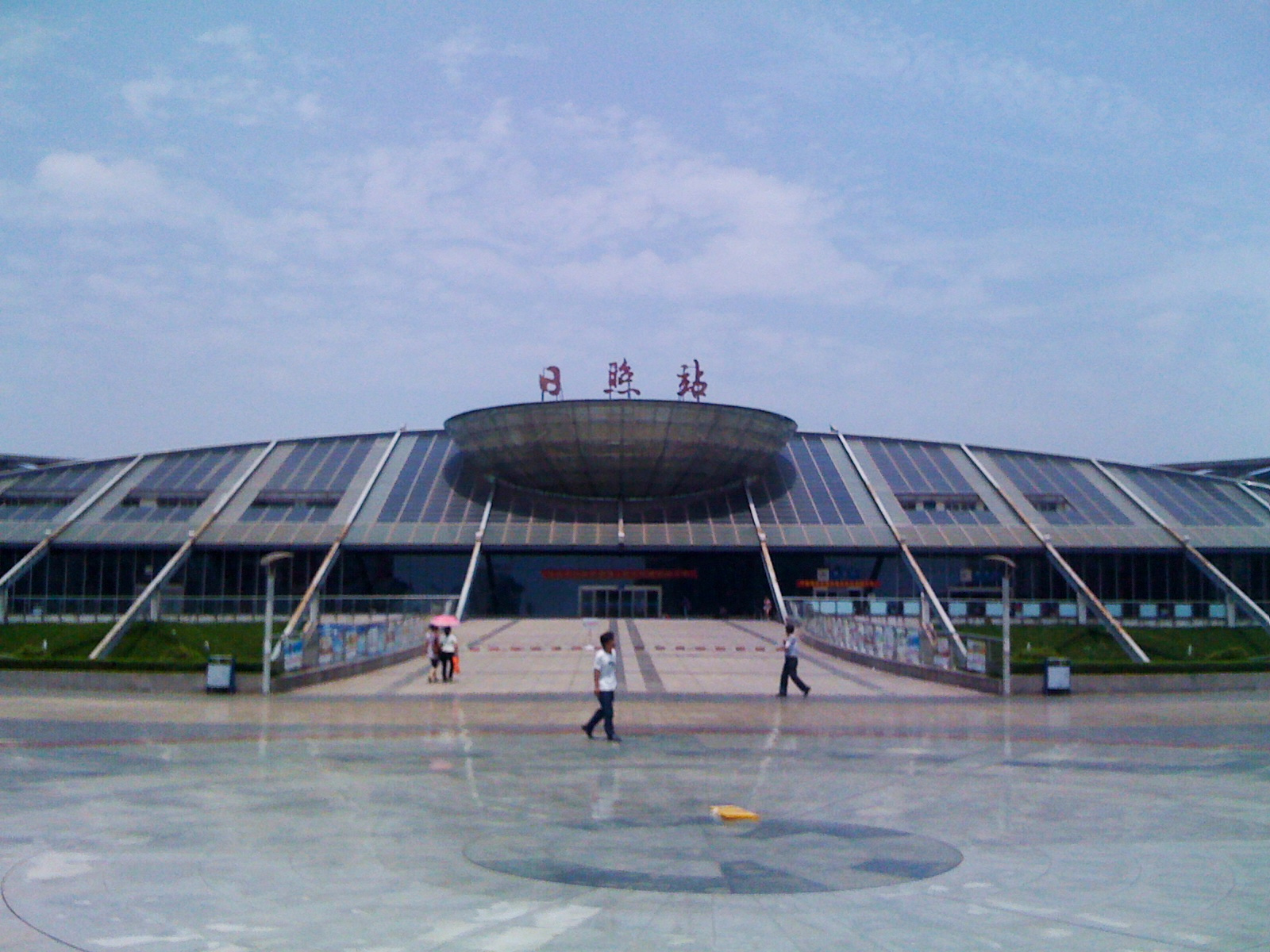
- Exterior of the station

General information
- Location: Donggang District, Rizhao, Shandong; China
- Coordinates: 35.403977°N 119.527174°E
- Operated by: China Railway High-speed
- Line(s): Yanzhou–Shijiusuo railway Rizhao–Lankao high-speed railway
Location

Rizhao railway station is a railway station in Donggang District, Rizhao, Shandong, China.

The station is the eastern terminus for passenger services of Yanzhou–Shijiusuo railway, however the line continues east to the Rizhao Port.

The railway station has been rebuilt and expanded; it reopened in April 2025.

== See also ==
- Rizhao West railway station
