= Qufu East railway station =

Railway station in Qufu, Shandong, China

Qufu East 曲阜东
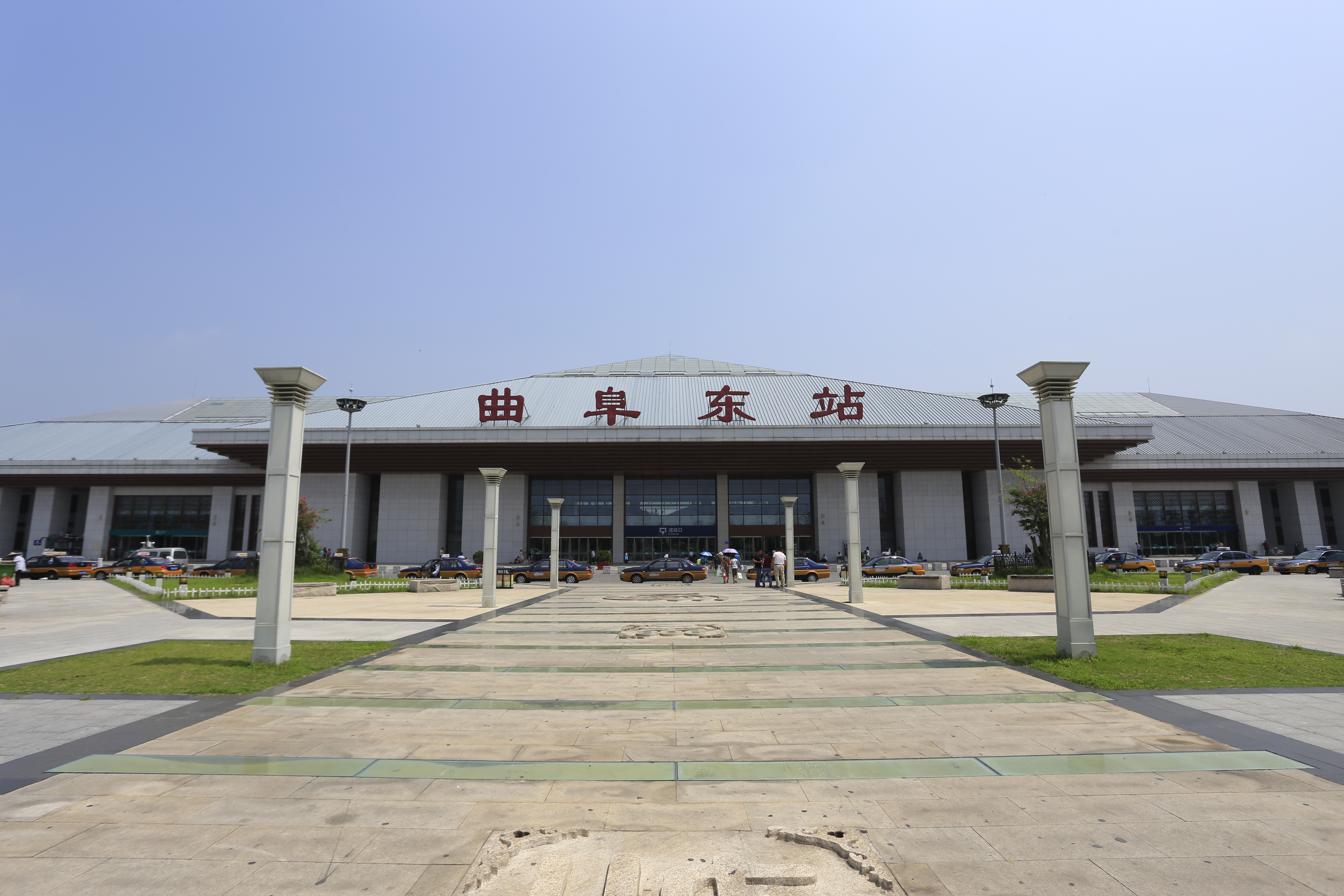

General information
- Other names: Qufudong railway station
- Location: Qufu, Jining, Shandong; China
- Coordinates: 35.556547°N 117.06306°E
- Operator: China Railway Jinan Group; China Railway Corporation
- Lines: Beijing–Shanghai high-speed railway Rizhao–Lankao high-speed railway (via chord to Qufu South); Jinan–Zaozhuang high-speed railway (Under Construction)

History
- Opened: June 30, 2011
Location

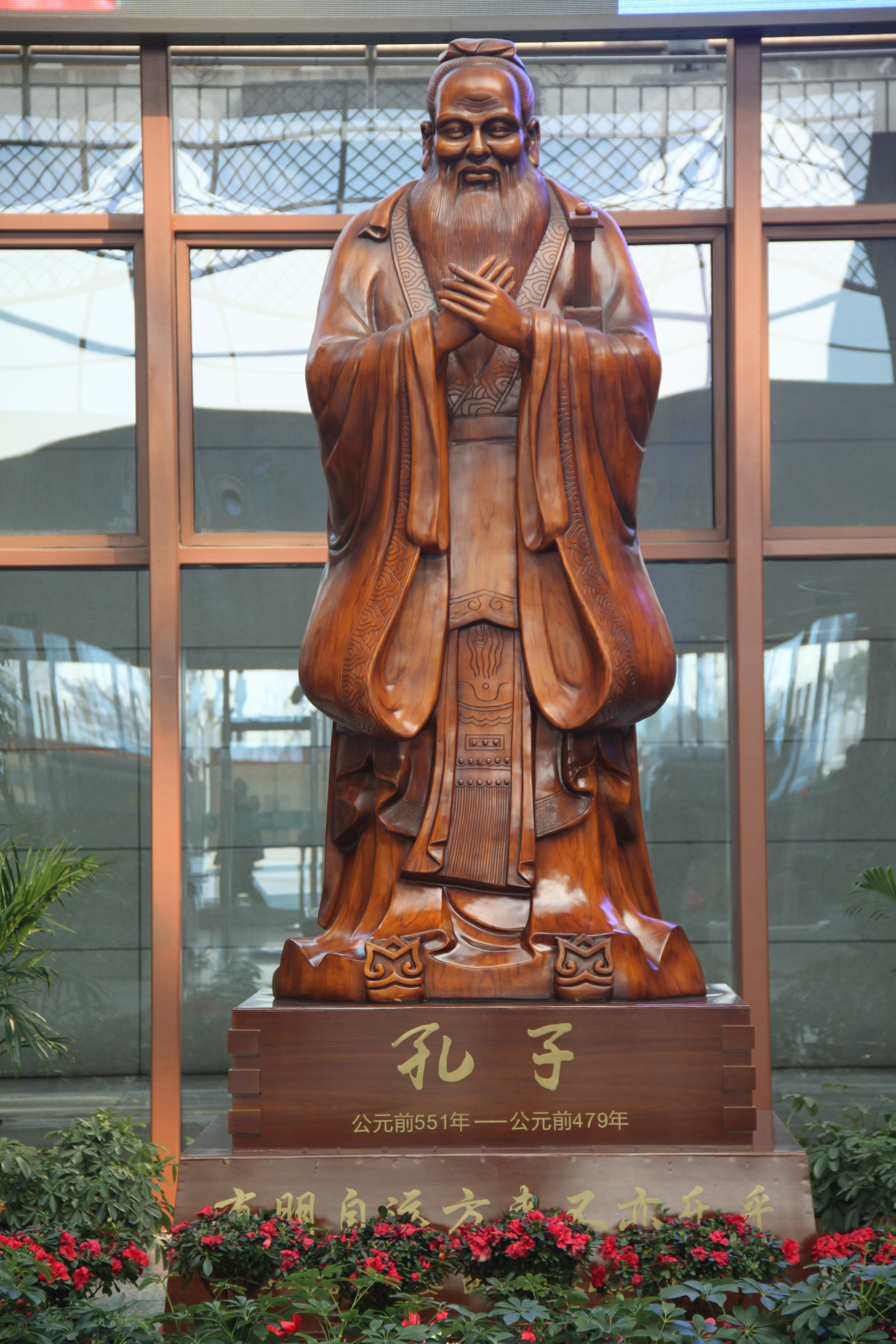
Statue of Kongzi (Confucius) in the railway station.

Qufu East railway station (Chinese: 曲阜东站) is a high-speed railway station in Qufu, Jining, Shandong, China. It is served by the Beijing–Shanghai high-speed railway.

Although located within the Qufu county-level city, the station is quite a distance to the south-east from Qufu's urban area. The city centre can be reached with the K01 bus, from which the older Qufu railway station, serving local and slower trains, can be reached with city bus number 5.

== Service ==
As of January 2012, about 20 pairs of G- and D-series fast trains stop at Qufu East every day. Most of them have Beijing or Shanghai, or one of the intermediate cities (Tianjin, Jinan, Xuzhou), as the destination. A few direct D trains continue to points outside of the main Beijing-Shanghai corridor, namely Zhengzhou, Qingdao, and Hangzhou, and Fuzhou.

== Future Development ==
It will be served by Jinan–Zaozhuang high-speed railway in 2027.

== Notes ==
Preceding station	China Railway High-speed	Following station
Tai'an towards Beijing South or Tianjin West	Beijing–Shanghai high-speed railway Part of the Beijing–Fuzhou high-speed railway	Tengzhou East towards Shanghai Hongqiao
Sishui South towards Rizhao West	Rizhao–Qufu high-speed railway	Terminus
