= Yanzhou–Shijiusuo railway =

Railroad in northern China

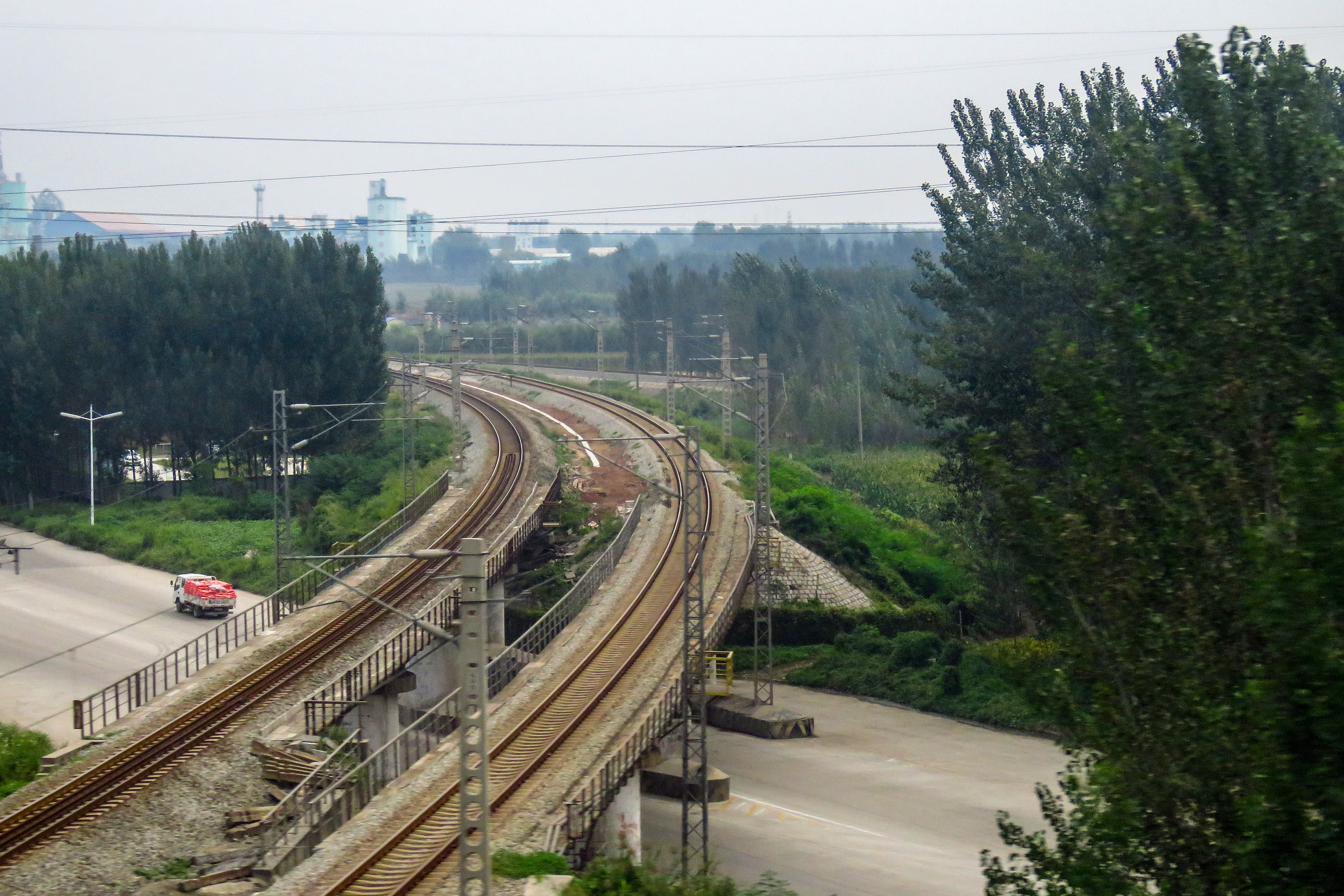
Nantaolou Station on the Yanshi Railway

The Yanzhou–Shijiusuo railway or Yanshi railway (simplified Chinese: 兖石铁路; traditional Chinese: 兖石鐵路; pinyin: yǎnshí tiělù), is a railroad in northern China between Yanzhou and Rizhao railway station (formerly known as Shijiusuo railway station) in Rizhao. The entire line, 307.9 km (191 mi) in length, is located in Shandong Province and was built from 1981 to 1985. The Yanshi railway is a major conduit for the shipment of coal from Shanxi Province.

== History ==
The Yanzhou–Shijiusuo railway was funded by the first major installment of Japanese assistance loan that China received after embarking on economic reforms in the late 1970s. In December 1979, the Chinese and Japanese governments agreed to a development assistance loan of 50 billion Japanese yen (about US$220 million at the exchange rates of the time) to build the ports of Qinhuangdao and Shijiusuo (Rizhao) and rail lines feeding the ports, the Beijing–Qinhuangdao and Yanzhou–Shijiusuo. Japan's development assistance loans carried a low rate of interest of 0.75 to 1.5% over a term of 30 years with interest-only payments in the first ten years. The first loan-funded projects in China were designed to facilitate the export sales of coal to Japan. At the time, natural resource sales was an important means of earning hard currency for China's economy. The Yanshi railway, built with loan funding from 1981 to 1985, shipped coal from coal fields around Yanzhou in southern Shandong Province. Since then, the rail corridor has been linked further inland with the Xinxiang–Yanzhou, Xinxiang–Yueshan and Houma–Yueshan railways to form a major coal-shipment corridor for southern Shanxi Province.

== Rail connections ==
- Yanzhou: Beijing–Shanghai railway, Xinxiang–Yanzhou railway
- Dongdu: Dongdu–Pingyi railway
- Linyi: Jiaozhou–Xinyi railway, Zaozhuang–Linyi railway
- Rizhao: Shanxi–Henan–Shandong railway

== See also ==
- List of railways in China
