= Shanghai–Xi'an high-speed train =

High-speed train services between Shanghai and Xi'an

Shanghai–Xi'an high-speed train 沪西高速动车组列车
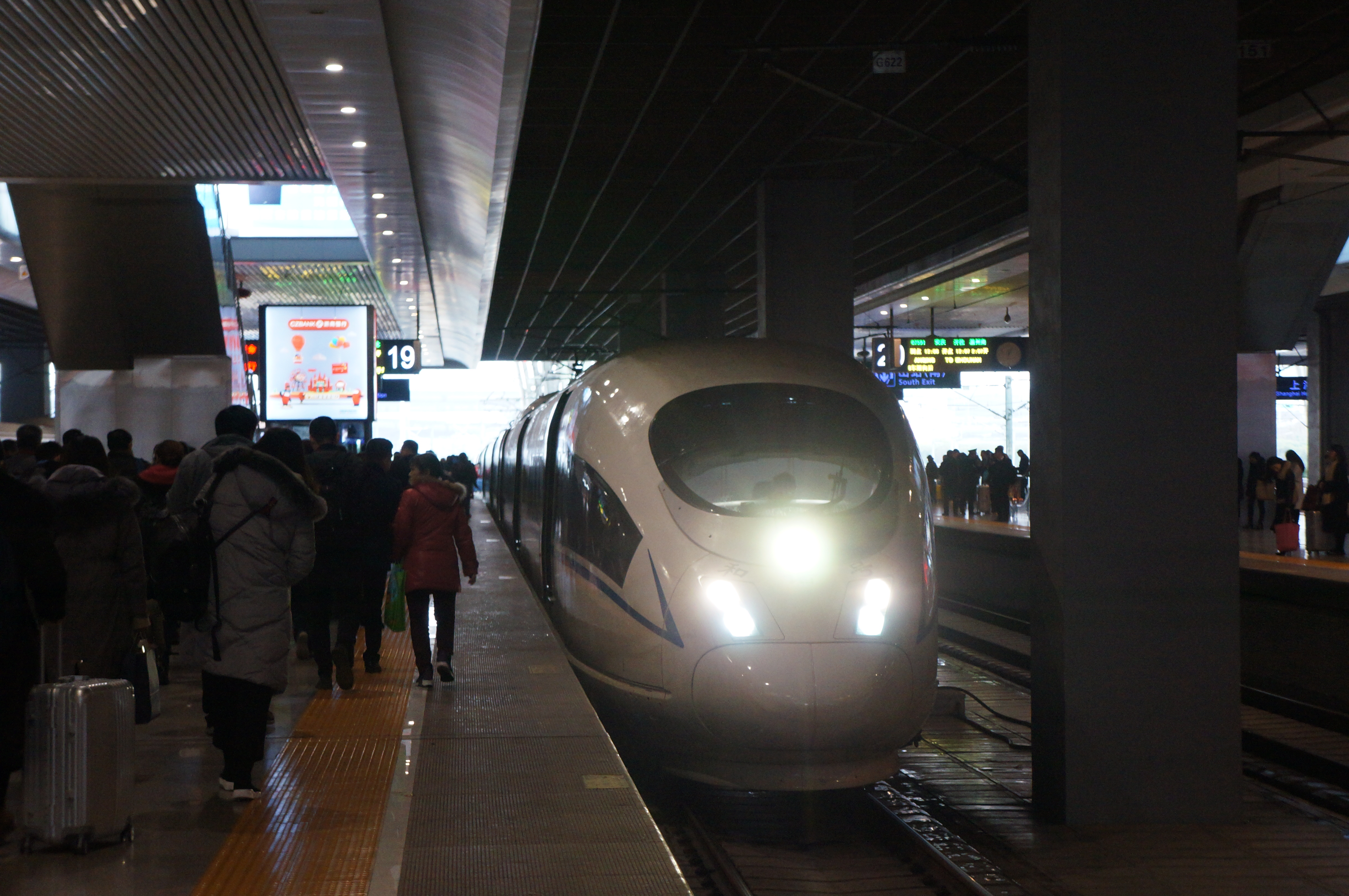
- A CRH380B EMU on the G1924 service at Shanghai Hongqiao

Overview
- Service type: G-series trains
- Status: Operational
- Locale: China
- First service: 10 September 2016
- Current operators: CR Shanghai; CR Xi'an; CR Zhengzhou

Route
- Termini: Shanghai Hongqiao; Xi'an North
- Distance travelled: 1,459 kilometres (907 mi) (G359-362, G1911-1942); 1,517 kilometres (943 mi) (G3151-3154, G3175-3178)
- Average journey time: 5h 53m - 9h 18m
- Train number: G359-362, G1911-1942, G3151-3154, G3175-3178
- Lines used: Beijing–Shanghai HSR and Xuzhou–Lanzhou HSR (G359-362, G1911-1942); Beijing–Shanghai HSR, Hefei–Nanjing passenger railway, Shangqiu–Hangzhou HSR and Xuzhou–Lanzhou HSR (G3151-3154, G3176/3177); Xuzhou–Lanzhou HSR, Shangqiu–Hangzhou HSR, Hefei–Nanjing passenger railway and Shanghai–Nanjing ICR (G3178/3175)

On-board services
- Classes: Business seat; First class seat; Second class seat
- Catering facilities: Dining car; Trolley refreshment service

Technical
- Rolling stock: CRH380B
- Track gauge: 1,435 mm (4 ft 8 1/2 in)
- Operating speed: 300 km/h
- Track owner: China Railway

The Shanghai–Xi'an high-speed train (沪西高速动车组列车) are high-speed train services between Shanghai and Xi'an, an ancient capital of China and the capital of Shaanxi Province. Trains are operated by CR Shanghai, CR Xi'an and CR Zhengzhou.

== History ==
The high-speed train services between Shanghai and Xi'an commenced on 10 September 2016, with the inauguration of the Zhengzhou–Xuzhou HSR (part of Xuzhou–Lanzhou HSR).

The G1912/1913 and G1930/1927 trains were extended to Lanzhou West on 10 July 2017 (later changed to G1970/1971 and G1972/1969) with the opening of the Baoji–Lanzhou section of the Xuzhou–Lanzhou HSR. The G1974/1975 and G1976/1973 trains were extended to Chongqing West on 28 December 2017.

On December 30, 2019, two new trains between Shanghai and Xi'an began operation, via Beijing–Shanghai HSR, Hefei–Nanjing passenger railway, Shangqiu–Hangzhou HSR and Xuzhou–Lanzhou HSR.

== Operations ==
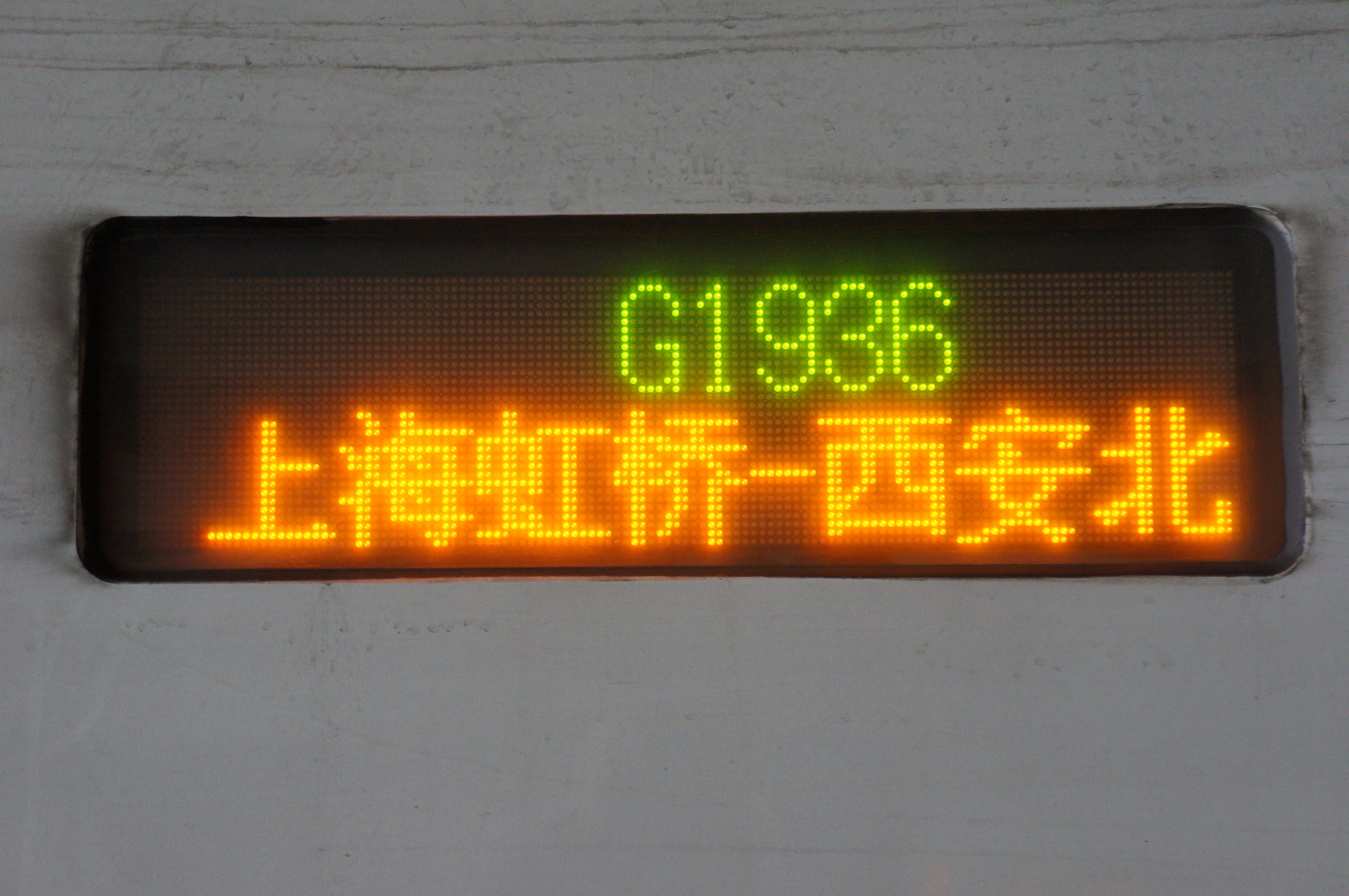
An info board outside a G1936 train

The G360/361 and G362/359 trains offer faster services with only three intermediate stops (Zhengzhou East, Xuzhou East and Nanjing South), and are called as "benchmark trains" (Chinese: 标杆车). Other trains are services with more stops and longer travelling time.

According to the train numbering rules of China Railway, odd numbers are for south or west bound trains and even numbers are for north or east bound trains. The trains from Shanghai to Xi'an travel northbound on Beijing–Shanghai HSR and westbound on Xuzhou–Lanzhou HSR, and the trains from Xi'an to Shanghai travel eastbound on Xuzhou–Lanzhou HSR and southbound on Beijing–Shanghai HSR. Therefore, all the train services on this route have 2 train numbers for the same service.

- ● : stop at the station
- | : pass the station
- : Benchmark train

=== Shanghai → Xi'an ===
Via Xuzhou East

Stops	G360/361	G1920/1921	G1924/1925	G1928/1929	G1932/1933	G1936/1937	G1940/1941
Shanghai Hongqiao	●	●	●	●	●	●	●
Kunshan South	｜	｜	●	●	｜	｜	｜
Suzhou North	｜	｜	●	｜	●	●	｜
Wuxi East	｜	●	｜	｜	●	｜	●
Changzhou North	｜	●	●	｜	｜	●	｜
Danyang North	｜	｜	｜	●	｜	｜	｜
Zhenjiang South	｜	｜	●	●	●	｜	｜
Nanjing South	●	●	●	●	●	●	●
Chuzhou	｜	｜	｜	●	｜	｜	｜
Bengbu South	｜	●	●	｜	｜	｜	｜
Suzhou East	｜	｜	｜	●	｜	｜	｜
Xuzhou East	●	●	●	●	●	●	●
Xiaoxian North	｜	●	●	｜	｜	●	｜
Yongcheng North	｜	｜	｜	●	｜	｜	｜
Dangshan South	｜	｜	｜	｜	｜	●	｜
Shangqiu	｜	｜	●	｜	｜	｜	●
Minquan North	｜	●	●	｜	｜	｜	●
Lankao South	｜	｜	｜	●	｜	｜	●
Kaifeng North	｜	｜	●	｜	｜	｜	｜
Zhengzhou East	●	●	●	●	●	●	●
Gongyi South	｜	●	｜	｜	｜	｜	｜
Luoyang Longmen	｜	｜	●	●	｜	●	●
Mianchi South	｜	●	｜	｜	｜	｜	｜
Sanmenxia South	｜	｜	●	｜	●	｜	●
Huashan North	｜	●	●	●	●	｜	｜
Weinan North	｜	｜	●	●	｜	｜	｜
Xi'an North	●	●	●	●	●	●	●

Via Hefei

Stops	G3176/3177	G3152/3153
Shanghai Hongqiao	●	●
Kunshan South	｜	●
Suzhou North	｜	●
Wuxi East	｜	●
Changzhou North	｜	●
Nanjing South	●	●
Quanjiao	●	●
Hefei	●	●
Huainan South	●	●
Shouxian	●	●
Yingshang North	｜	●
Fuyang West	●	●
Gucheng East	｜	●
Bozhou South	●	●
Lumiao	｜	●
Shangqiu East	｜	●
Shangqiu	●	●
Kaifeng North	｜	●
Zhengzhou East	●	●
Luoyang Longmen	●	●
Sanmenxia South	｜	●
Lingbao West	｜	●
Huashan North	●	●
Xi'an North	●	●

=== Xi'an → Shanghai ===
Via Xuzhou East

Stops	G1914/1911	G362/359	G1918/1915	G1922/1919	G1926/1923	G1938/1935	G1942/1939
Xi'an North	●	●	●	●	●	●	●
Weinan North	●	｜	●	｜	｜	｜	●
Huashan North	●	｜	●	｜	●	｜	｜
Lingbao West	｜	｜	｜	●	｜	｜	｜
Sanmenxia South	●	｜	●	｜	｜	｜	｜
Mianchi South	｜	｜	｜	｜	●	｜	｜
Luoyang Longmen	｜	｜	●	●	●	●	●
Zhengzhou West	｜	｜	｜	｜	｜	｜	●
Zhengzhou East	●	●	●	●	●	●	●
Kaifeng North	●	｜	●	｜	｜	｜	●
Lankao South	●	｜	｜	●	●	｜	｜
Minquan North	｜	｜	｜	｜	｜	｜	●
Shangqiu	●	｜	●	●	｜	｜	●
Dangshan South	｜	｜	●	｜	｜	｜	｜
Yongcheng North	｜	｜	｜	｜	｜	｜	●
Xiaoxian North	｜	｜	｜	●	｜	｜	｜
Xuzhou East	●	●	●	●	●	●	●
Suzhou East	●	｜	｜	●	●	｜	●
Bengbu South	｜	｜	●	｜	●	｜	｜
Chuzhou	｜	｜	｜	｜	｜	｜	●
Nanjing South	●	●	●	●	●	●	●
Zhenjiang South	｜	｜	｜	｜	●	｜	｜
Danyang North	｜	｜	●	｜	｜	｜	｜
Changzhou North	●	｜	｜	●	●	●	●
Wuxi East	｜	｜	｜	●	●	●	●
Suzhou North	●	｜	●	●	｜	●	｜
Kunshan South	●	｜	●	｜	｜	｜	｜
Shanghai Hongqiao	●	●	●	●	●	●	●

Via Hefei

Stops	G3154/3151	G3178/3175
Xi'an North	●	●
Huashan North	●	●
Luoyang Longmen	●	●
Gongyi South	●	｜
Zhengzhou East	●	●
Kaifeng North	●	●
Lankao South	｜	●
Minquan North	｜	●
Shangqiu	●	●
Shangqiu East	｜	●
Lumiao	●	｜
Bozhou South	●	●
Gucheng East	●	｜
Taihe East	｜	●
Fuyang West	●	●
Yingshang North	●	●
Shouxian	●	●
Huainan South	●	●
Hefei	●	●
Nanjing South	●	●
Zhenjiang South	●	｜
Changzhou North	●	｜
Wuxi East	●	｜
Suzhou North	●	｜
Zhenjiang	｜	●
Changzhou	｜	●
Wuxi	｜	●
Suzhou	｜	●
Kunshan South	｜	●
Shanghai Hongqiao	●	●

== Rolling stocks ==
The services are operated by CRH380B trainsets.

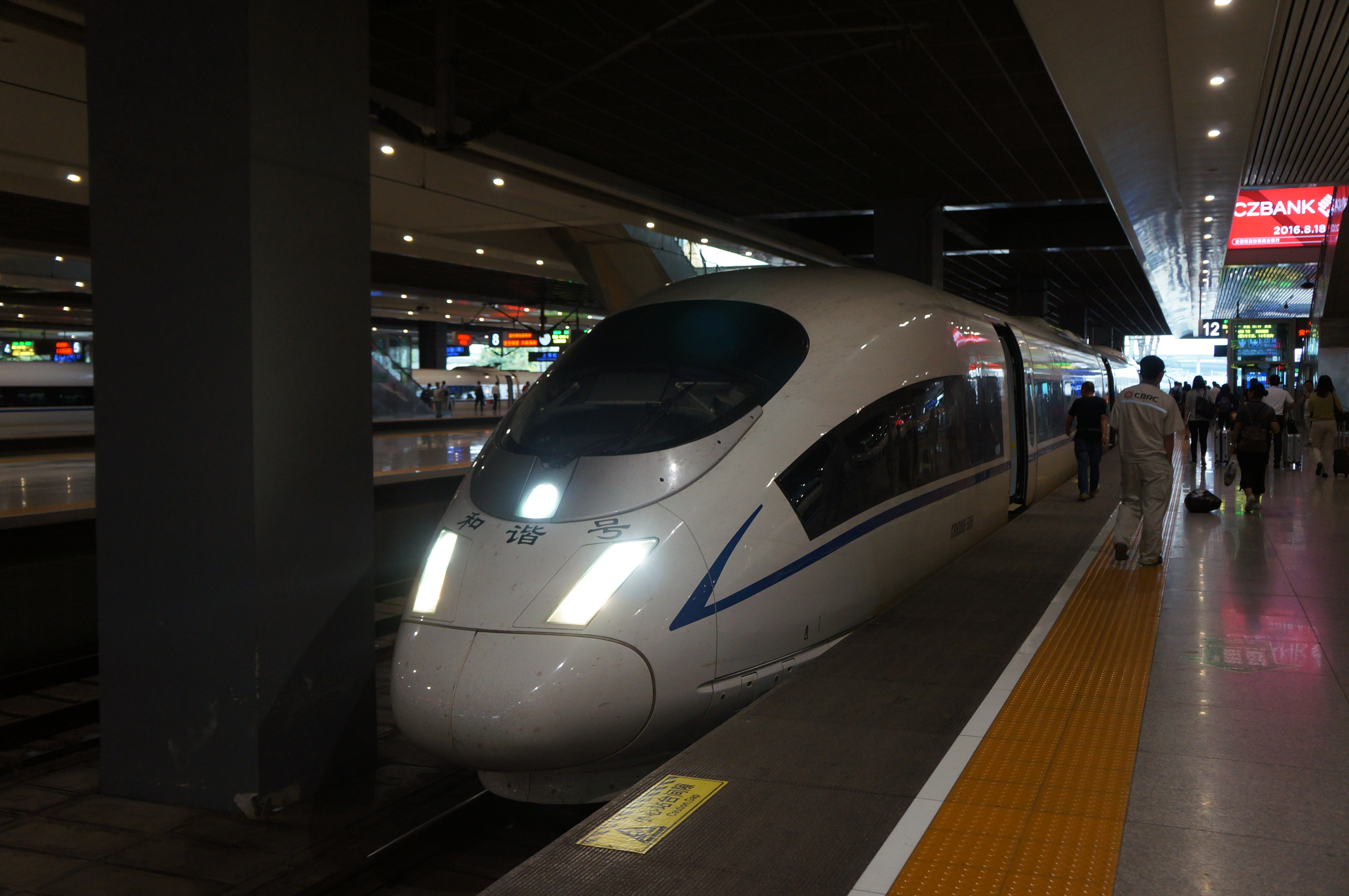
A CRH380B EMU on G1936 service

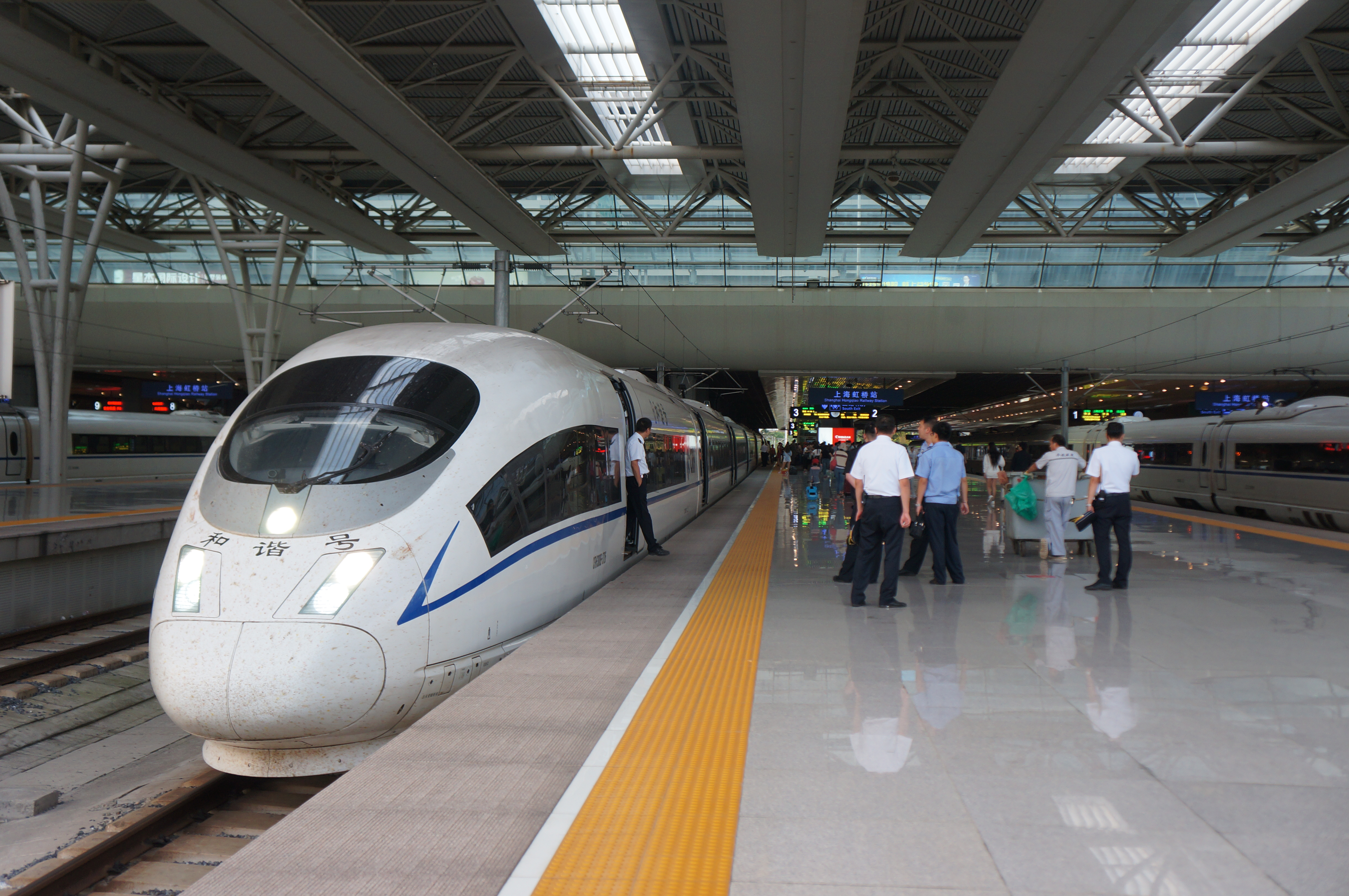
A CRH380B EMU on G1919 service

== Other services ==
The services between Shanghai and Lanzhou (G1972/1969 and G1970/1971), Chongqing (G1974/1975 and G1976/1973) also provide services between Shanghai and Xi'an.
