= Langxi South railway station =

Railway station in Xuancheng, Anhui

Langxi South 郎溪南

General information
- Location: Shizi, Langxi County, Xuancheng, Anhui; China
- Coordinates: 30°56′24.46″N 119°9′5.5″E
- Line: Shangqiu–Hangzhou high-speed railway
- Platforms: 2

History
- Opened: June 28, 2020
Location

Langxi South railway station (Chinese: 郎溪南站) is a railway station in Shizi, Langxi County, Xuancheng, Anhui, China. The station has two side platforms and two through tracks.

The station opened with the Hefei-Huzhou section of the Shangqiu–Hangzhou high-speed railway on 28 June 2020.

Preceding station	China Railway High-speed	Following station
Xuancheng towards Shangqiu	Shangqiu–Hangzhou high-speed railway	Guangde South towards Tonglu
