= Feidong railway station =

Closed railway station in Hefei, Anhui

Feidong 肥东
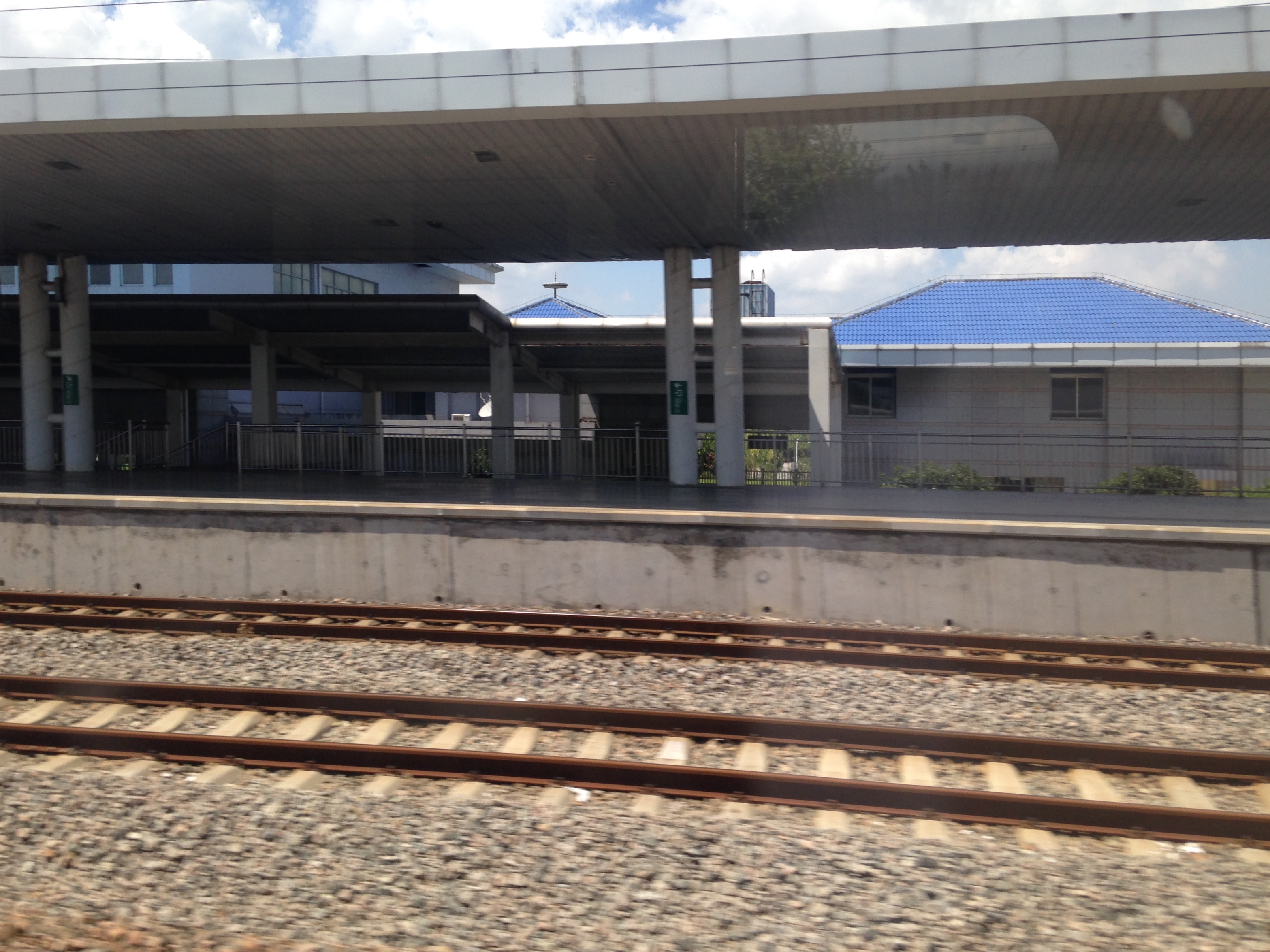
- The station in 2016

General information
- Location: Feidong County, Hefei, Anhui; China
- Coordinates: 31.864°N 117.480°E
- Line: Closed for renovation

History
- Opened: May 1, 2008
Location

Feidong railway station (Chinese: 肥东站; pinyin: Féidōng zhàn) is a closed railway station in Feidong County, Hefei, Anhui, China. The railway station closed on 11 October 2023 and will reopen when North Riverside high-speed railway opens.

== History ==
Feidong railway station was built with the Hefei–Nanjing railway. The line opened on 18 April 2008 however the intermediate stations, including Feidong, did not open until 1 May.

Passenger service was suspended from 16 April 2017 to allow the station to be rebuilt.

On 28 June 2020 the station reopened with the second phase of the Shangqiu–Hangzhou high-speed railway.

The railway station closed on 11 October 2023 and will reopen when the Shanghai–Nanjing Riverside high-speed railway opens.

== Metro station ==
It will be connected to Feidong metro station on Line 2 (East extension) of Hefei Metro.

Preceding station	China Railway High-speed	Following station
Hefei South towards Shangqiu	Shangqiu–Hangzhou high-speed railway	Zhegao towards Tonglu
