= Anji railway station =

Railway station in Huzhou, Zhejiang

Anji 安吉
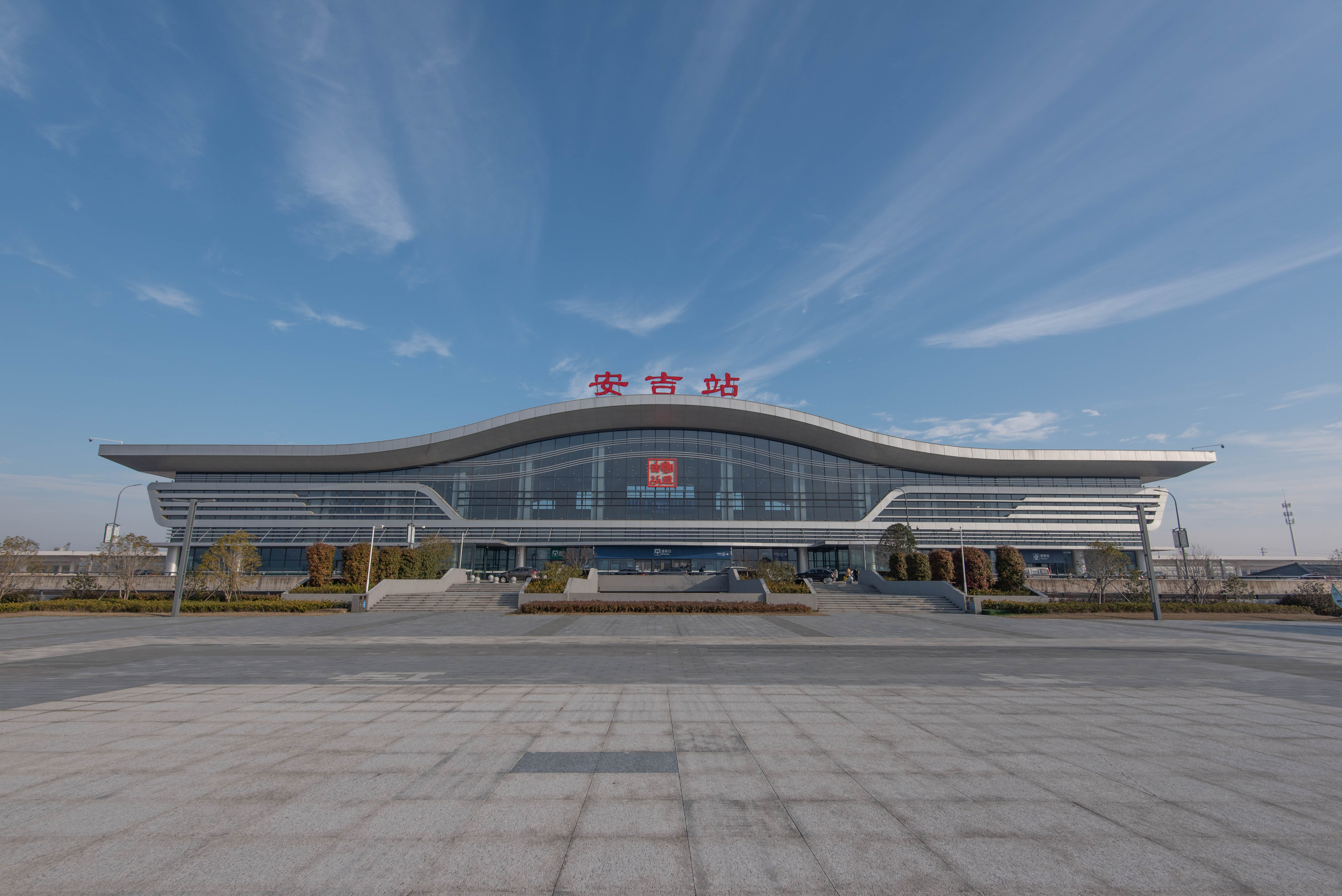

General information
- Location: Anji County, Huzhou, Zhejiang; China
- Coordinates: 30°49′06″N 119°36′21″E
- Line: Shangqiu–Hangzhou high-speed railway
- Platforms: 3

History
- Opened: 28 June 2020
Location

Anji railway station (Chinese: 安吉站) is a railway station in Anji County, Huzhou, Zhejiang, China. The station has one side platform, one island platform, and two through tracks without platform faces.

The station opened with the Hefei-Huzhou section of the Shangqiu–Hangzhou high-speed railway on 28 June 2020.

Preceding station	China Railway High-speed	Following station
Guangde South towards Shangqiu	Shangqiu–Hangzhou high-speed railway	Huzhou towards Tonglu
