= Fuyang West railway station (Zhejiang) =

Railway station in Hangzhou, Zhejiang

Fuyang West 富阳西
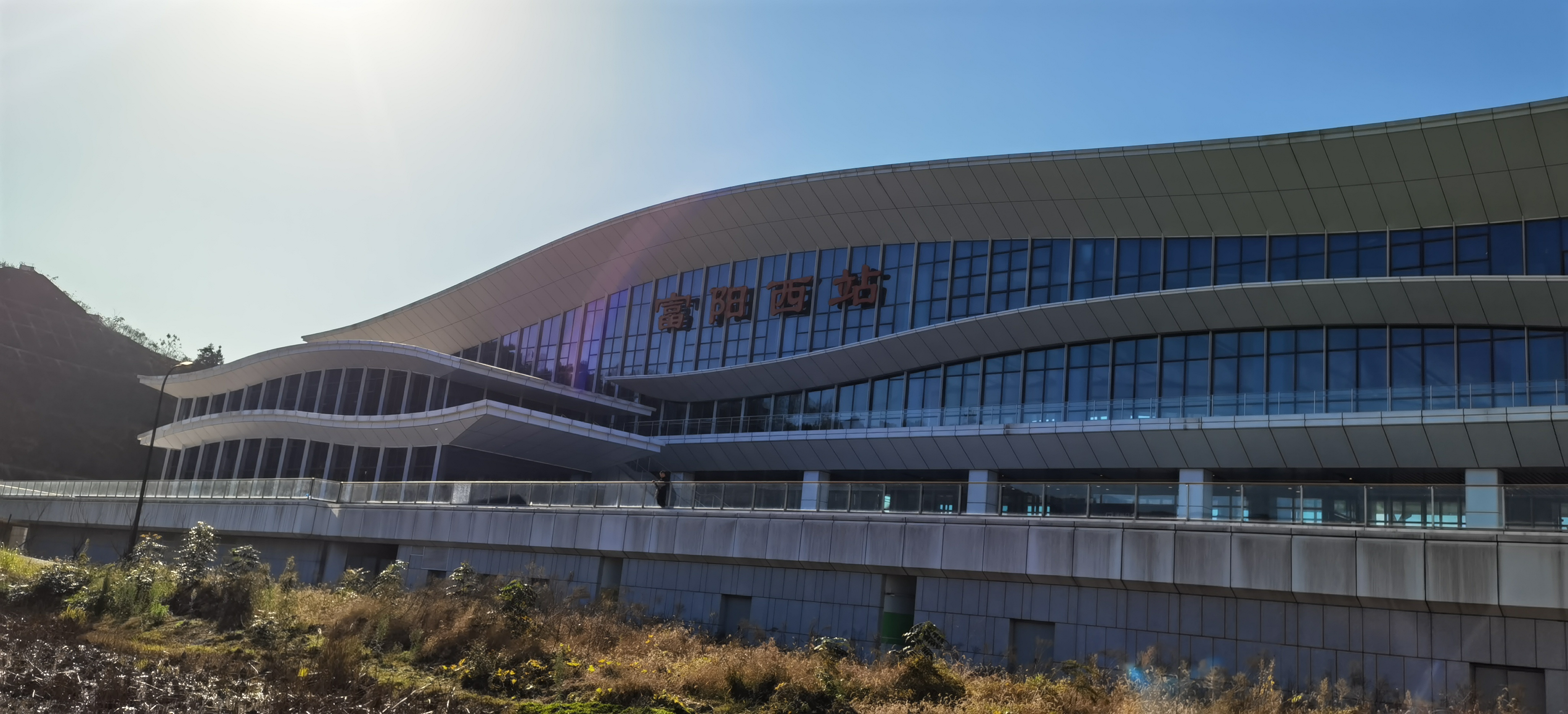
- Station hall

General information
- Location: Fuyang District, Hangzhou, Zhejiang; China
- Coordinates: 30°02′54″N 119°51′23″E
- Line: Shangqiu–Hangzhou high-speed railway (Huzhou–Hangzhou section)
- Platforms: 4 (2 island platforms)

Construction
- Structure type: Elevated

History
- Opened: 22 September 2022
Location

Fuyang West railway station (Chinese: 富阳西站) is a railway station in Fuyang District, Hangzhou, Zhejiang, China. It is an intermediate stop on the Shangqiu–Hangzhou high-speed railway (Huzhou–Hangzhou section). It was opened on 22 September 2022.

== See also ==
- Fuyang railway station (Zhejiang)

Preceding station	China Railway High-speed	Following station
Hangzhou West towards Shangqiu	Shangqiu–Hangzhou high-speed railway	Tonglu East towards Tonglu
