= Wuhu South railway station =

Railway station in Wuhu, Anhui

Wuhu South 芜湖南

General information
- Other names: Yijiang (弋江) (2015-2020)
- Location: Yijiang District, Wuhu, Anhui; China
- Coordinates: 31°15′1.67″N 118°22′26.71″E
- Lines: Nanjing–Anqing intercity railway Shangqiu–Hangzhou high-speed railway

History
- Opened: December 6, 2015
Location

Wuhu South railway station (Chinese: 芜湖南站) is a railway station in Yijiang District, Wuhu, Anhui, China.

== History ==
This railway station opened on 6 December 2015 with the Nanjing–Anqing intercity railway. It was originally called Yijiang railway station named after the Yijiang District. From 25 June 2020, the station has been known as Wuhu South.

== Monorail ==
An interchange with Line 1 of Wuhu Rail Transit opened on 3 November 2021.

Preceding station	China Railway High-speed	Following station
Wuhu towards Nanjing South	Nanjing–Anqing intercity railway	Fanchang West towards Anqing
Wuhu towards Shangqiu	Shangqiu–Hangzhou high-speed railway	Wanzhi South towards Tonglu
