= Chaohu East railway station =

Railway station in Hefei, China

Chaohu East 巢湖东
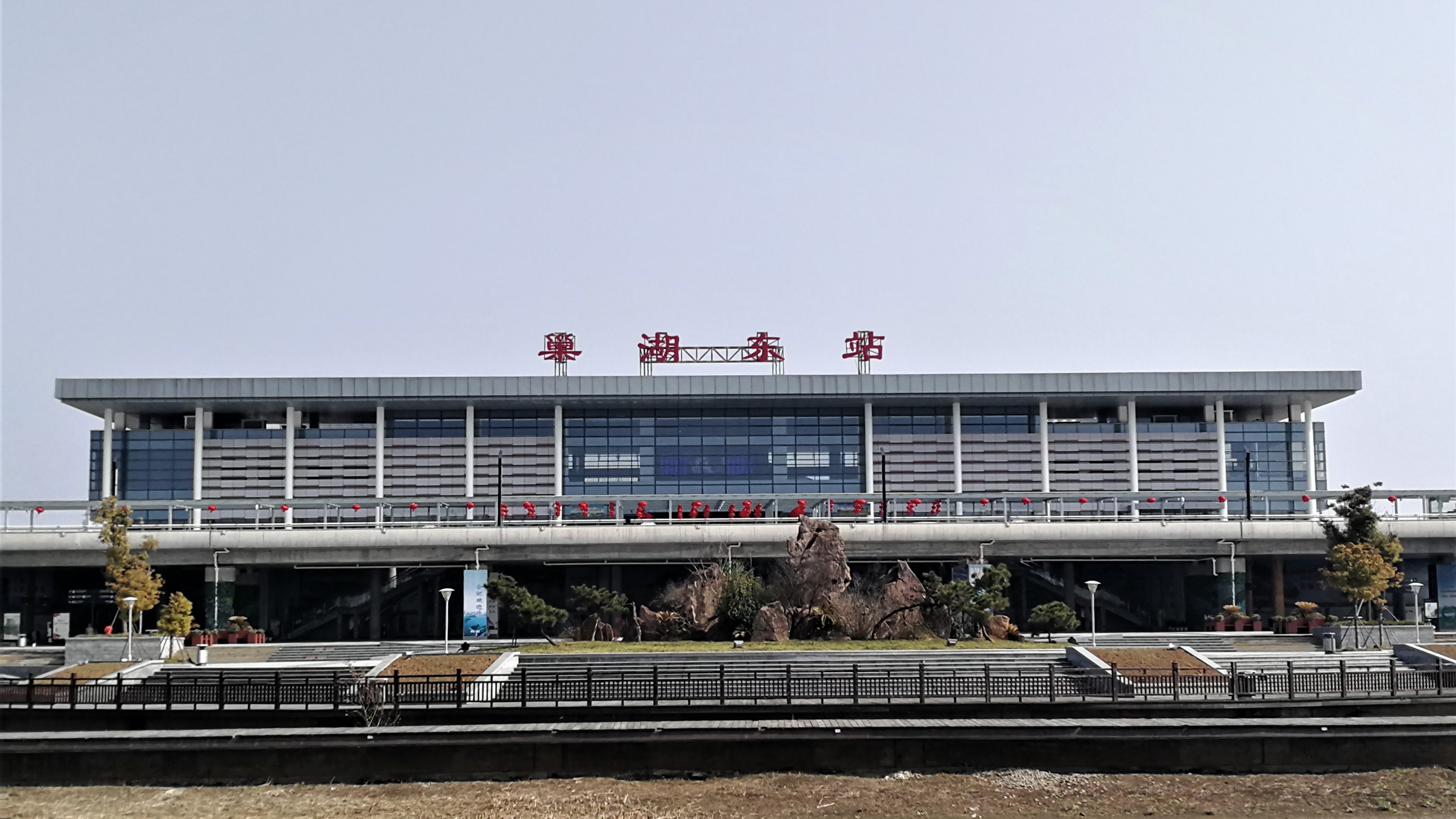

General information
- Other names: Chaohudong
- Location: Chaohu, Hefei, Anhui; China
- Coordinates: 31°37′11″N 117°55′10″E
- Operated by: China Railway Shanghai Group
- Lines: Hefei–Fuzhou high-speed railway; Shangqiu–Hangzhou high-speed railway; Chaohu–Ma'anshan intercity railway (U/C)

Other information
- Station code: Telegraph code: GUH; Pinyin code: CHD
- Classification: 2nd class station

History
- Opened: June 28, 2015
Location

Chaohu East railway station (Chinese: 巢湖东站; pinyin: Cháohú Dōng Zhàn) is a railway station in Chaohu, Hefei, Anhui. This station commenced services with Hefei–Fuzhou high-speed railway (part of Beijing–Taipei high-speed rail corridor) on June 28, 2015.

Preceding station	China Railway High-speed	Following station
Changlinhe towards Hefei South	Hefei–Fuzhou high-speed railway Part of the Beijing–Fuzhou high-speed railway	Wuwei towards Fuzhou
Zhegao towards Shangqiu	Shangqiu–Hangzhou high-speed railway	Hanshan South towards Tonglu
