= Hanshan South railway station =

Railway station in Anhui, China

Hanshan South 含山南
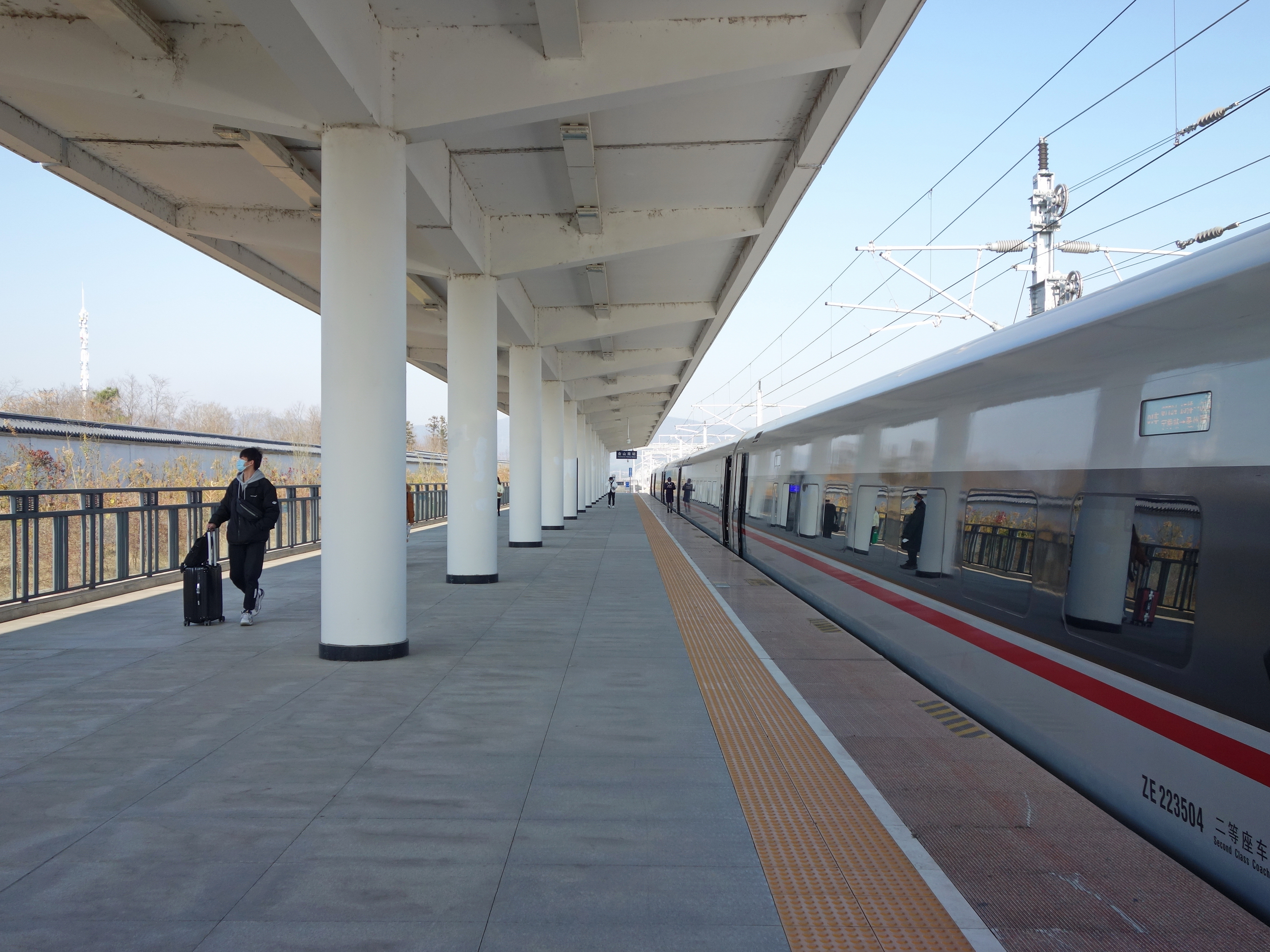
- Platforms at Hanshan South Railway Station

General information
- Location: Hanshan County, Ma'anshan, Anhui; China
- Coordinates: 31°28′50″N 118°05′14″E
- Operated by: China Railway
- Line(s): Shangqiu–Hangzhou high-speed railway

History
- Opened: 28 June 2020
Location

Hanshan South railway station (Chinese: 含山南站) is a railway station in Hanshan County, Ma'anshan, Anhui, China.

It opened with the second section of the Shangqiu–Hangzhou high-speed railway on 28 June 2020.

Preceding station	China Railway High-speed	Following station
Chaohu East towards Shangqiu	Shangqiu–Hangzhou high-speed railway	Wuhu North towards Tonglu
