= Wuhu North railway station =

Railway station in Xuancheng, Anhui

Wuhu North 芜湖北
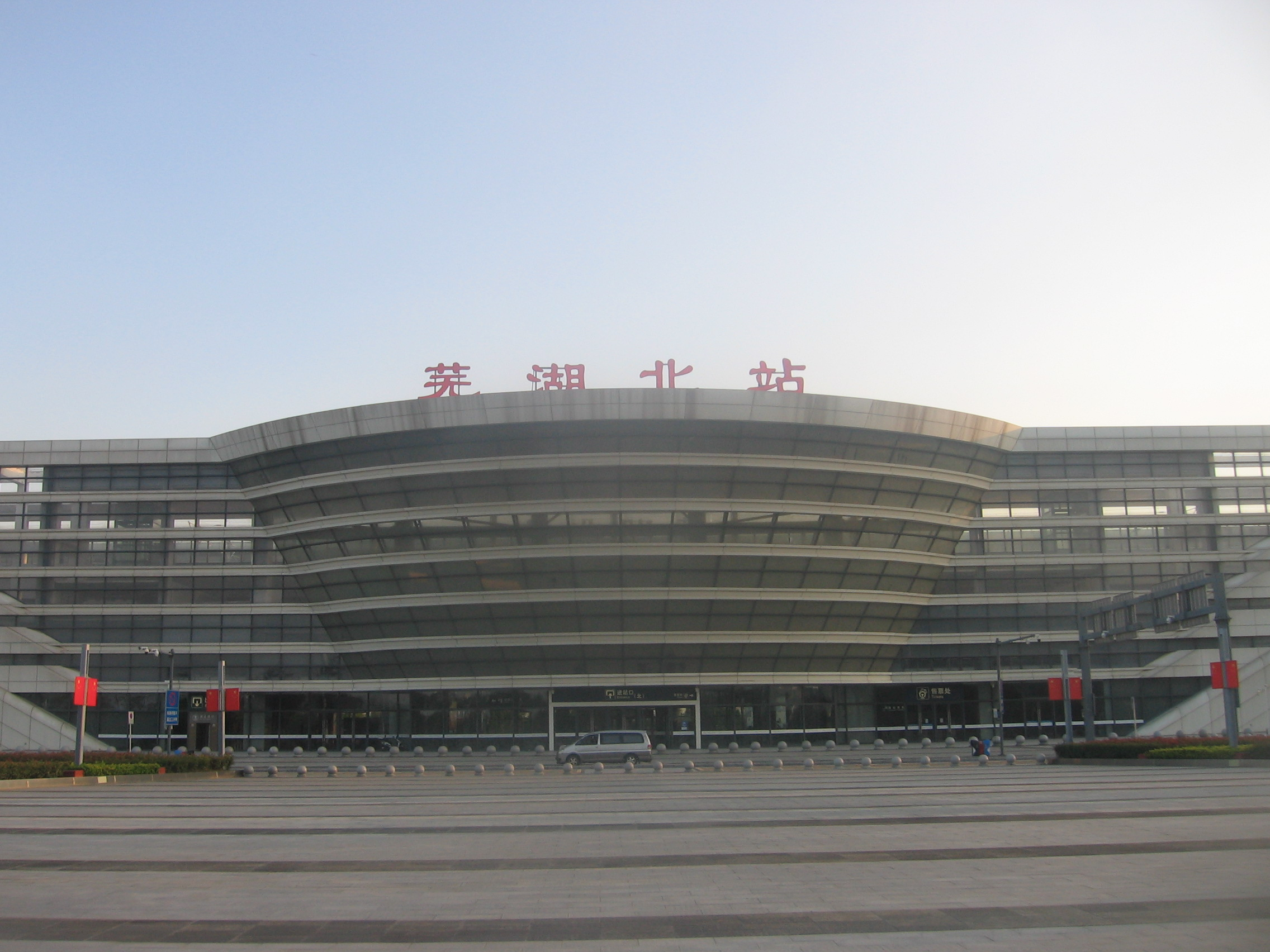

General information
- Location: Jiujiang District, Wuhu, Anhui; China
- Coordinates: 31°21′27.39″N 118°15′2.94″E
- Line: Shangqiu–Hangzhou high-speed railway
- Platforms: 2

History
- Opened: June 28, 2020
Location

Wuhu North railway station (Chinese: 芜湖北站) is a railway station in Jiujiang District, Wuhu, Anhui, China. The station has two side platforms and two through tracks. It is situated north of the Yangtze.

The station opened with the Hefei-Huzhou section of the Shangqiu–Hangzhou high-speed railway on 28 June 2020.

Preceding station	China Railway High-speed	Following station
Hanshan South towards Shangqiu	Shangqiu–Hangzhou high-speed railway	Wuhu towards Tonglu
