= Wanzhi South railway station =

Railway station in Wuhu, Anhui

Wanzhi South 湾沚南
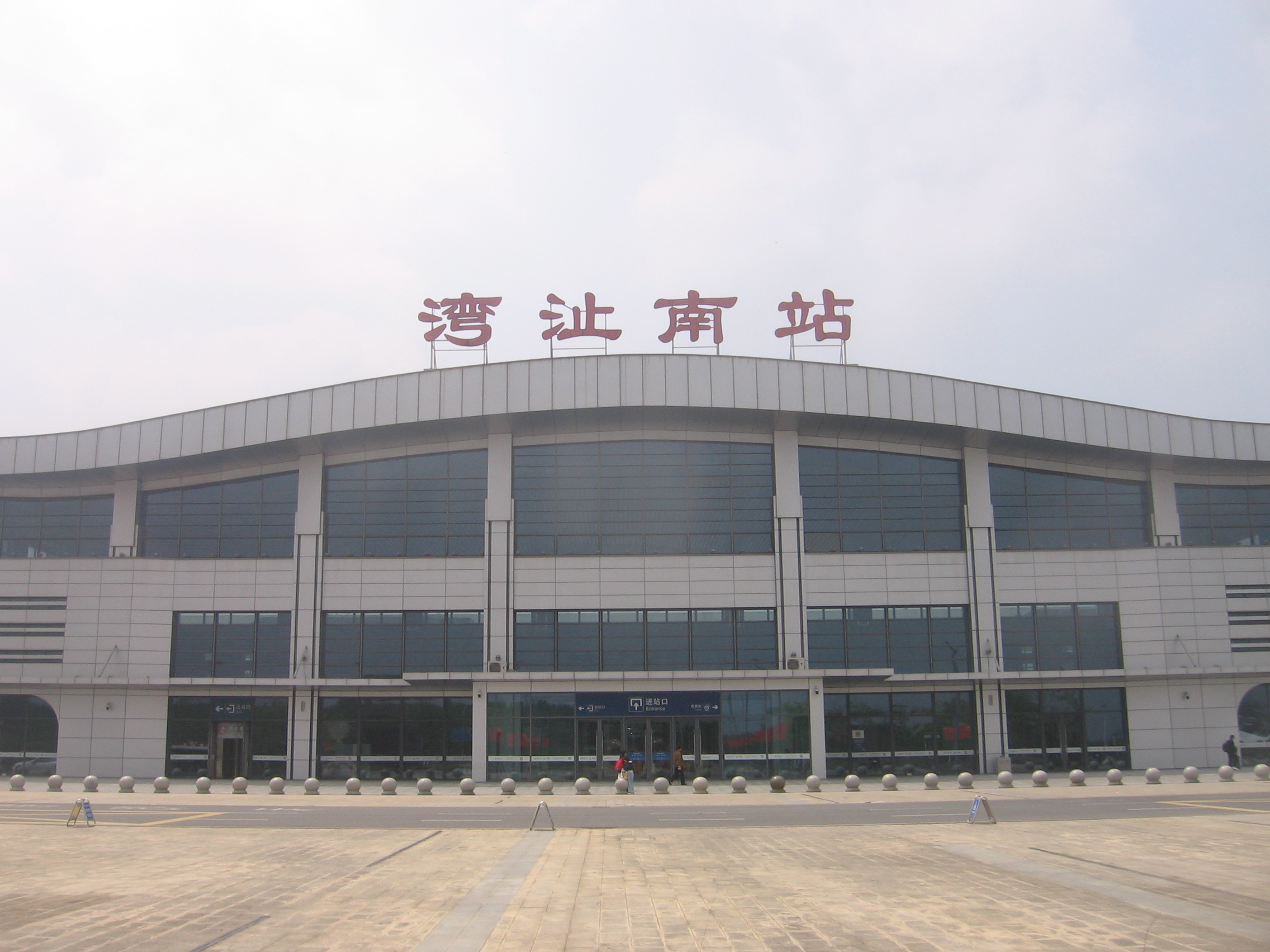

General information
- Location: Wanzhi District, Wuhu, Anhui; China
- Coordinates: 31°5′42.6″N 118°34′46.26″E
- Line: Shangqiu–Hangzhou high-speed railway
- Platforms: 2

History
- Opened: June 28, 2020
Location

Wanzhi South railway station (Chinese: 湾沚南站; pinyin: Wānzhǐ Nán Zhàn) is a railway station in Wanzhi District, Wuhu, Anhui, China. It is an intermediate station on the Shangqiu–Hangzhou high-speed railway. The station has two side platforms and two central bypass tracks.

== History ==
This station replaces Wanzhi railway station which was closed in January 2008. It opened with the second phase of the Shangqiu–Hangzhou high-speed railway on 28 June 2020.

Preceding station	China Railway High-speed	Following station
Wuhu South towards Shangqiu	Shangqiu–Hangzhou high-speed railway	Xuancheng towards Tonglu
