= Bozhou South railway station =

Railway station in Bozhou, Anhui, China

Coordinates: 33.7955°N 115.7920°E

Bozhou South 亳州南

General information
- Location: Qiaocheng District, Bozhou, Anhui; China
- Line: Shangqiu–Hangzhou high-speed railway

History
- Opened: 1 December 2019
Location
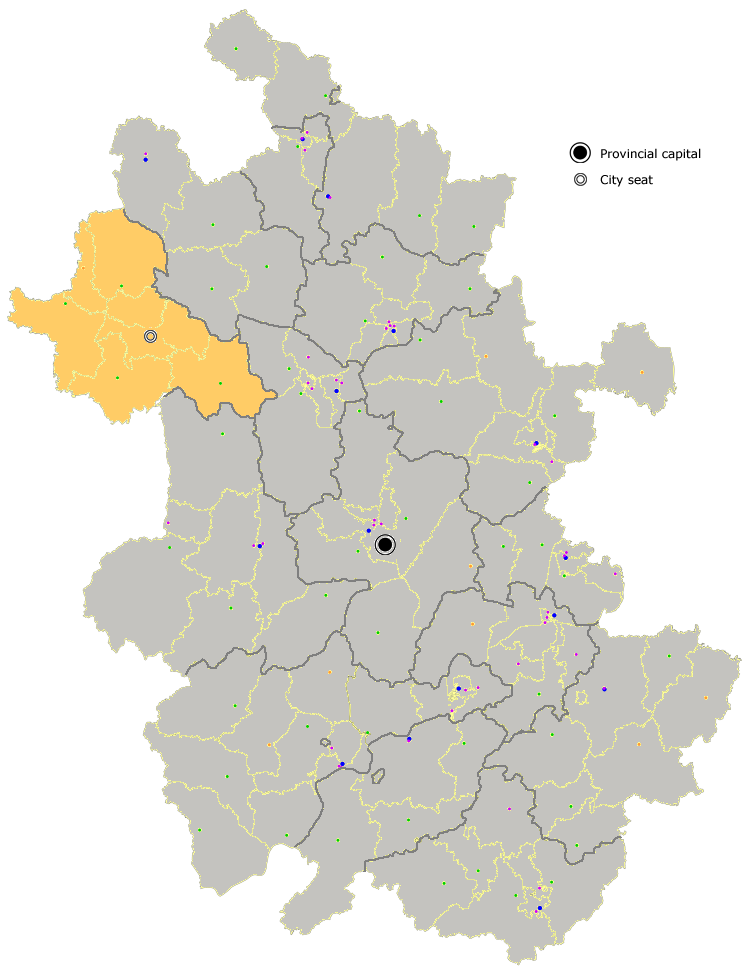
- Location within China Anhui Fuyang Location within China

Bozhou South railway station (Chinese: 亳州南站) is a railway station on the Shangqiu–Hangzhou high-speed railway in Qiaocheng District, Bozhou, Anhui, China. Opened on 1 December 2019, this is the second railway station in the built-up area of Qiaocheng District. Bozhou railway station offers conventional rail service.

| Preceding station | China Railway High-speed | Following station |
|---|---|---|
| Lumiao towards Shangqiu | Shangqiu–Hangzhou high-speed railway | Gucheng East towards Tonglu |
