= Zhegao railway station =

Railway station in Hefei, Anhui

Zhegao 柘皋

General information
- Location: Chaohu City, Hefei, Anhui; China
- Coordinates: 31°44′54″N 117°43′30″E
- Line: Shangqiu–Hangzhou high-speed railway

History
- Opened: June 28, 2020
Location

Zhegao railway station (Chinese: 柘皋站) is a railway station in Chaohu City, Hefei, Anhui, China.

This station has two platforms and two bypass tracks.

== History ==
The station opened with the second phase of the Shangqiu–Hangzhou high-speed railway on 28 June 2020.

Preceding station	China Railway High-speed	Following station
Feidong towards Shangqiu	Shangqiu–Hangzhou high-speed railway	Chaohu East towards Tonglu
