= Shouxian railway station =

Railway station in Huainan, Anhui

Shouxian 寿县
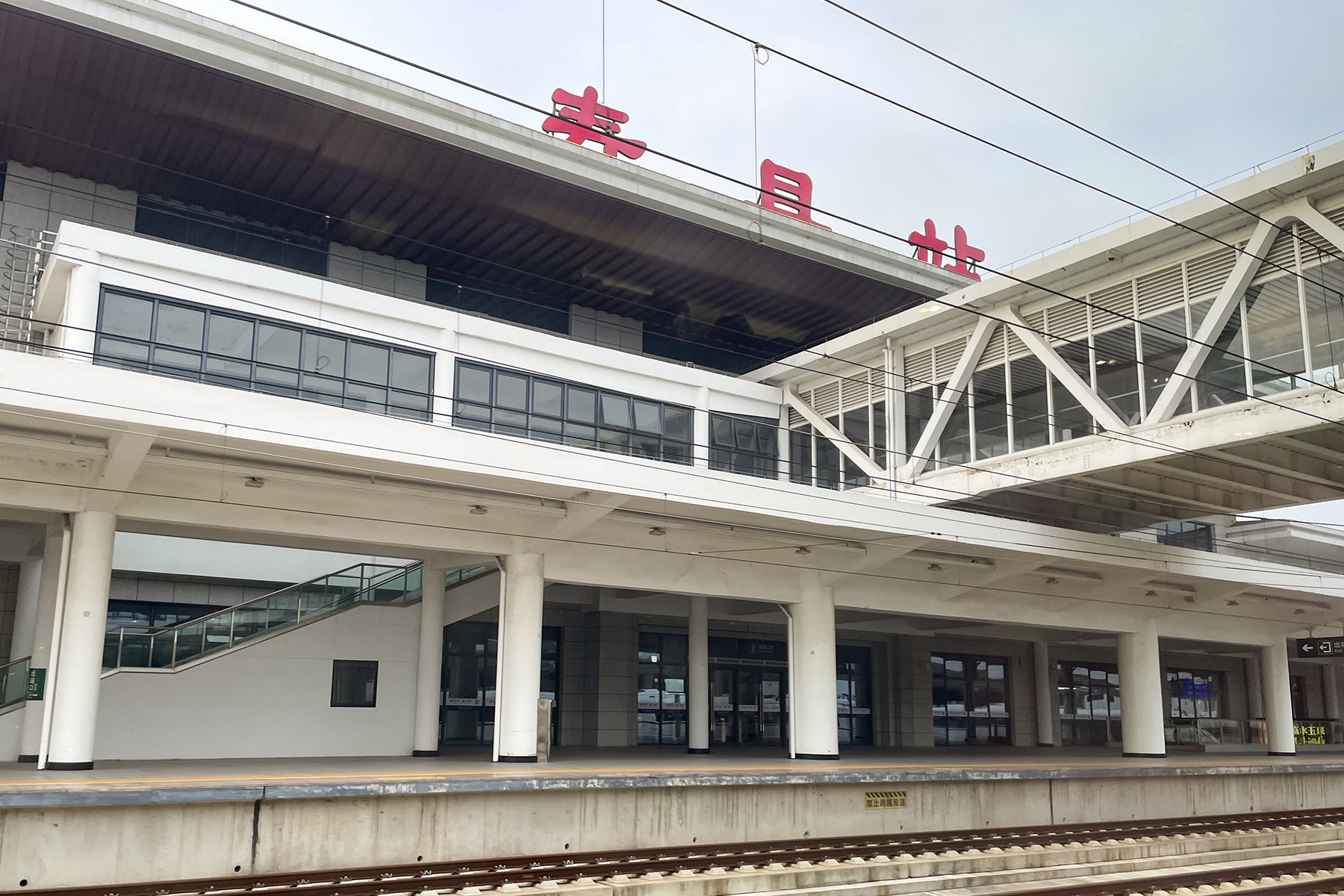
- Shouxian Railway Station

General information
- Location: Shou County, Huainan, Anhui; China
- Line: Shangqiu–Hangzhou high-speed railway

History
- Opened: December 1, 2019
Location

Shouxian railway station (Chinese: 寿县站) is a railway station on the Shangqiu–Hangzhou high-speed railway in Shou County, Huainan, Anhui, China. Opened on 1 December 2019, it is situated in the north of Shou County and is its only railway station.

Preceding station	China Railway High-speed	Following station
Fengtai South towards Shangqiu	Shangqiu–Hangzhou high-speed railway	Huainan South towards Tonglu
