= Huainan South railway station =

Railway station in Huainan, Anhui

Huainan South 淮南南

General information
- Location: Tianjia'an District, Huainan, Anhui; China
- Line: Shangqiu–Hangzhou high-speed railway

History
- Opened: December 1, 2019
Location

Huainan South railway station (Chinese: 淮南南站) is a railway station on the Shangqiu–Hangzhou high-speed railway in Tianjia'an District, Huainan, Anhui, China. Opened on 1 December 2019, it is the third railway station in the city.

== See also ==
- Huainan railway station
- Huainan East railway station

Preceding station	China Railway High-speed	Following station
Shouxian towards Shangqiu	Shangqiu–Hangzhou high-speed railway	Shuijiahu towards Tonglu
