= Lumiao railway station =

Railway station in Bozhou, Anhui, China

Lumiao 芦庙

General information
- Location: Qiaocheng District, Bozhou, Anhui; China
- Line: Shangqiu–Hangzhou high-speed railway

History
- Opened: December 1, 2019
Location

Lumiao railway station (Chinese: 芦庙站) is a railway station on the Shangqiu–Hangzhou high-speed railway in Qiaocheng District, Bozhou, Anhui, China. Opened on 1 December 2019, this is a rural station that serves several surrounding villages.

Preceding station	China Railway High-speed	Following station
Shangqiu East towards Shangqiu	Shangqiu–Hangzhou high-speed railway	Bozhou South towards Tonglu
