= Taihe East railway station =

Railway station in Fuyang, Anhui

Taihe East 太和东

General information
- Location: Taihe County, Fuyang, Anhui; China
- Line: Shangqiu–Hangzhou high-speed railway

History
- Opened: December 1, 2019
Location

Taihe East railway station (Chinese: 太和东站) is a railway station on the Shangqiu–Hangzhou high-speed railway in Taihe County, Fuyang, Anhui, China. Opened on 1 December 2019, this is the second railway station to serve the Taihe urban area. Taihe North railway station offers conventional rail service.

Preceding station	China Railway High-speed	Following station
Gucheng East towards Shangqiu	Shangqiu–Hangzhou high-speed railway	Fuyang West towards Tonglu
