= Wanzhi, Wuhu =

Coordinates: 31°09′45″N 118°32′07″E

Wanzhi 湾沚区
- District
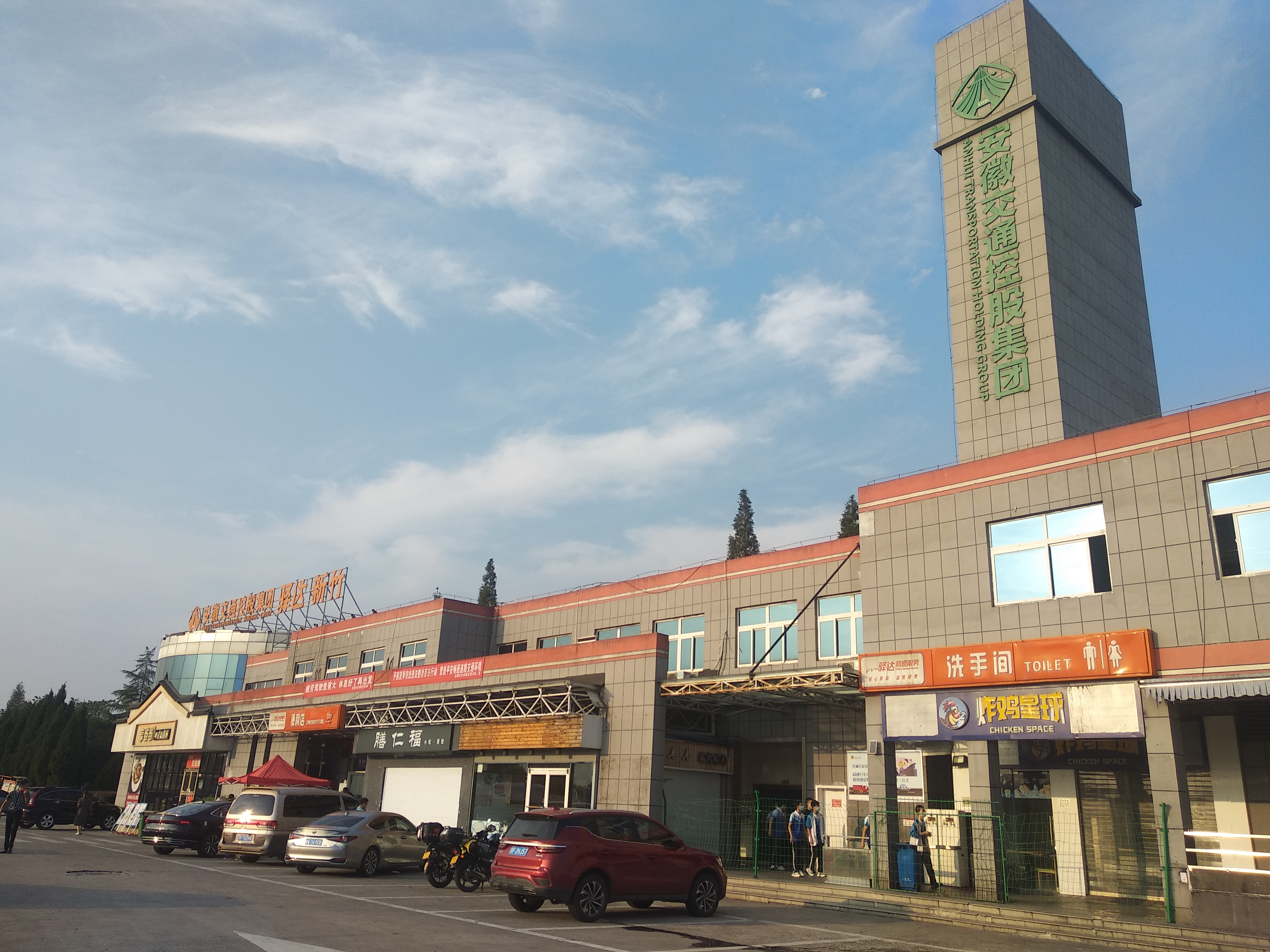
- Interactive map of Wanzhi
- Country: China
- Province: Anhui
- Prefecture-level city: Wuhu
- District seat: Wanzhi Town

Area
  - Total: 667 km^{2} (258 sq mi)

Population (2020)
  - Total: 344,016
  - Density: 516/km^{2} (1,340/sq mi)
- Time zone: UTC+8 (China Standard)
- Postal code: 241100

Wanzhi District (simplified Chinese: 湾沚区; traditional Chinese: 灣沚區; pinyin: Wānzhǐ Qū) is a district in Wuhu City, in the southeast of Anhui Province, China. It was renamed from Wuhu County (simplified Chinese: 芜湖县; traditional Chinese: 蕪湖縣; pinyin: Wúhú Xiàn) in 2020.

== Administrative divisions ==
Wanzhi District is divided to 5 towns and 1 other.

5 Towns

- Wanzhi (湾沚镇)
- Liulang (六郎镇)
- Taoxin (陶辛镇)
- Hongyang (红杨镇)
- Huaqiao (花桥镇)

1 Other

- Anhui Xinwu Economic Development Zone (安徽新芜经济开发区)

== Climate ==
Climate data for Wanzhi District, elevation 40 m (130 ft), (1991–2020 normals, extremes 1981–present)
Month	Jan	Feb	Mar	Apr	May	Jun	Jul	Aug	Sep	Oct	Nov	Dec	Year
Record high °C (°F)	21.5 (70.7)	29.2 (84.6)	34.6 (94.3)	34.3 (93.7)	36.4 (97.5)	38.7 (101.7)	40.1 (104.2)	41.4 (106.5)	39.4 (102.9)	33.5 (92.3)	29.5 (85.1)	23.2 (73.8)	41.4 (106.5)
Mean daily maximum °C (°F)	7.6 (45.7)	10.5 (50.9)	15.5 (59.9)	21.9 (71.4)	26.9 (80.4)	29.4 (84.9)	33.1 (91.6)	32.5 (90.5)	28.2 (82.8)	23.0 (73.4)	16.8 (62.2)	10.2 (50.4)	21.3 (70.3)
Daily mean °C (°F)	3.6 (38.5)	6.1 (43.0)	10.6 (51.1)	16.7 (62.1)	21.8 (71.2)	25.1 (77.2)	28.7 (83.7)	28.1 (82.6)	23.8 (74.8)	18.2 (64.8)	12.0 (53.6)	5.8 (42.4)	16.7 (62.1)
Mean daily minimum °C (°F)	0.7 (33.3)	2.8 (37.0)	6.8 (44.2)	12.4 (54.3)	17.7 (63.9)	21.7 (71.1)	25.2 (77.4)	24.9 (76.8)	20.5 (68.9)	14.5 (58.1)	8.3 (46.9)	2.6 (36.7)	13.2 (55.7)
Record low °C (°F)	−10.1 (13.8)	−10.0 (14.0)	−3.0 (26.6)	1.3 (34.3)	8.4 (47.1)	13.2 (55.8)	18.6 (65.5)	18.0 (64.4)	11.2 (52.2)	2.7 (36.9)	−4.1 (24.6)	−11.7 (10.9)	−11.7 (10.9)
Average precipitation mm (inches)	70.1 (2.76)	72.6 (2.86)	113.9 (4.48)	106.8 (4.20)	124.0 (4.88)	219.3 (8.63)	195.1 (7.68)	136.3 (5.37)	95.9 (3.78)	57.3 (2.26)	62.6 (2.46)	45.5 (1.79)	1,299.4 (51.15)
Average precipitation days (≥ 0.1 mm)	11.3	10.6	13.3	11.5	11.7	13.4	12.3	12.2	9.0	8.3	9.8	8.3	131.7
Average snowy days	4.2	2.1	0.8	0	0	0	0	0	0	0	0.3	1.1	8.5
Average relative humidity (%)	79	77	75	73	73	80	79	80	80	77	78	76	77
Mean monthly sunshine hours	105.7	112.1	136.0	159.8	174.2	144.0	197.8	192.2	157.0	156.7	134.6	125.0	1,795.1
Percentage possible sunshine	33	36	36	41	41	34	46	47	43	45	43	40	40
Source: China Meteorological Administration

== Transportation ==
Wanzhi District is served by Wanzhi South railway station on the Shangqiu–Hangzhou high-speed railway.

Wuhu Xuanzhou Airport in Wanzhi District opened on April 30, 2021.
