= Yingshang North railway station =

Railway station in Fuyang, Anhui

Yingshang North 颍上北
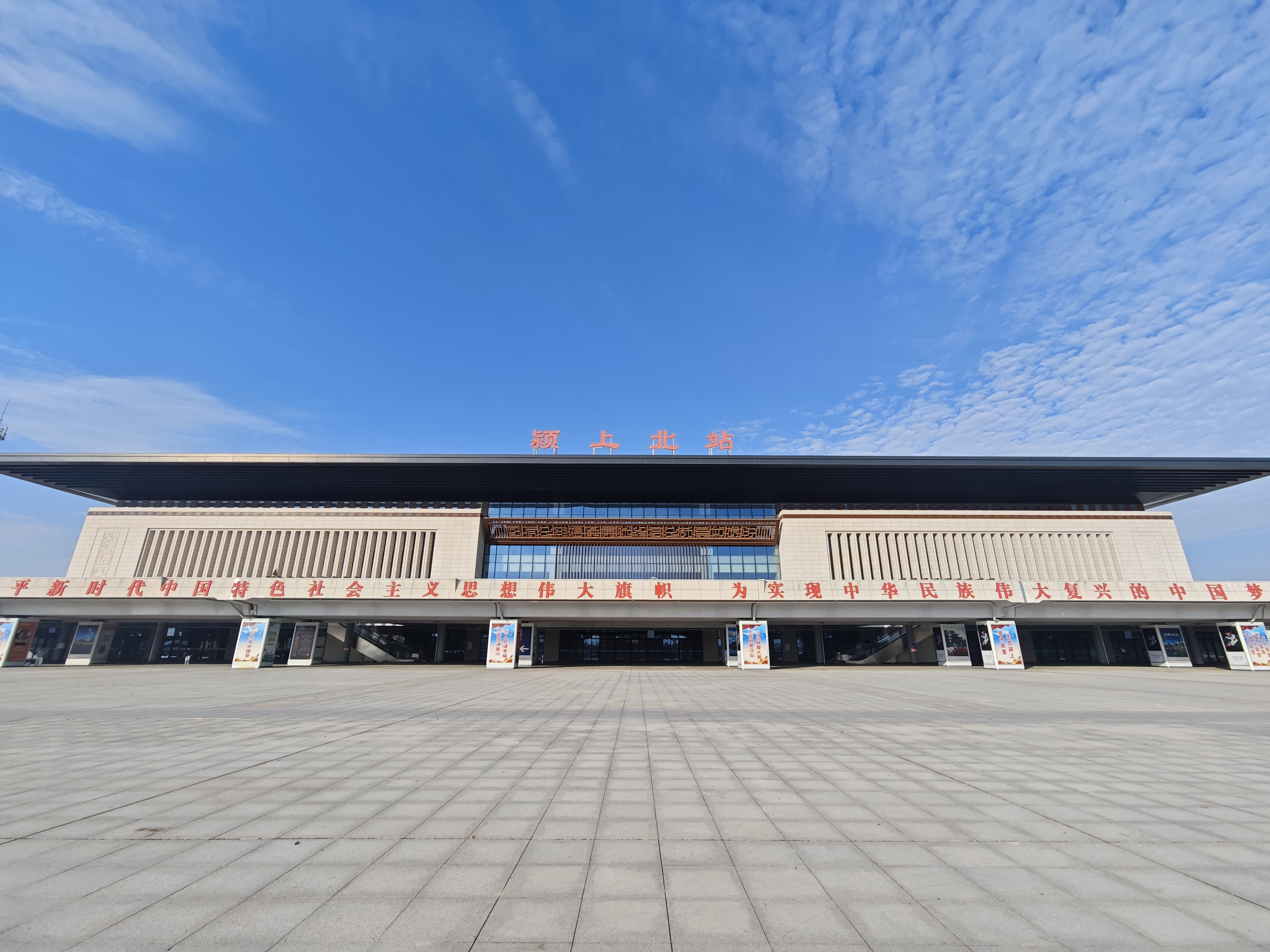

General information
- Location: Yingshang County, Fuyang, Anhui; China
- Line: Shangqiu–Hangzhou high-speed railway

History
- Opened: December 1, 2019
Location

Yingshang North railway station (Chinese: 颍上北站) is a railway station on the Shangqiu–Hangzhou high-speed railway in Yingshang County, Fuyang, Anhui, China. Opened on 1 December 2019, it lies significantly closer to the urban population than the conventional Yingshang railway station.

Preceding station	China Railway High-speed	Following station
Fuyang West towards Shangqiu	Shangqiu–Hangzhou high-speed railway	Fengtai South towards Tonglu
