= Gucheng East railway station =

Railway station in Bozhou, Anhui, China

Gucheng East 古城东

General information
- Location: Qiaocheng District, Bozhou, Anhui; China
- Coordinates: 33.5280°N 115.8063°E
- Line: Shangqiu–Hangzhou high-speed railway

History
- Opened: December 1, 2019
Location

Gucheng East railway station (Chinese: 古城东站) is a railway station on the Shangqiu–Hangzhou high-speed railway in Gucheng town, Qiaocheng District, Bozhou, Anhui, China. The station opened on 1 December 2019.

Preceding station	China Railway High-speed	Following station
Bozhou South towards Shangqiu	Shangqiu–Hangzhou high-speed railway	Taihe East towards Tonglu
