= Langxi County =

Langxi 郎溪县 Langki
- County
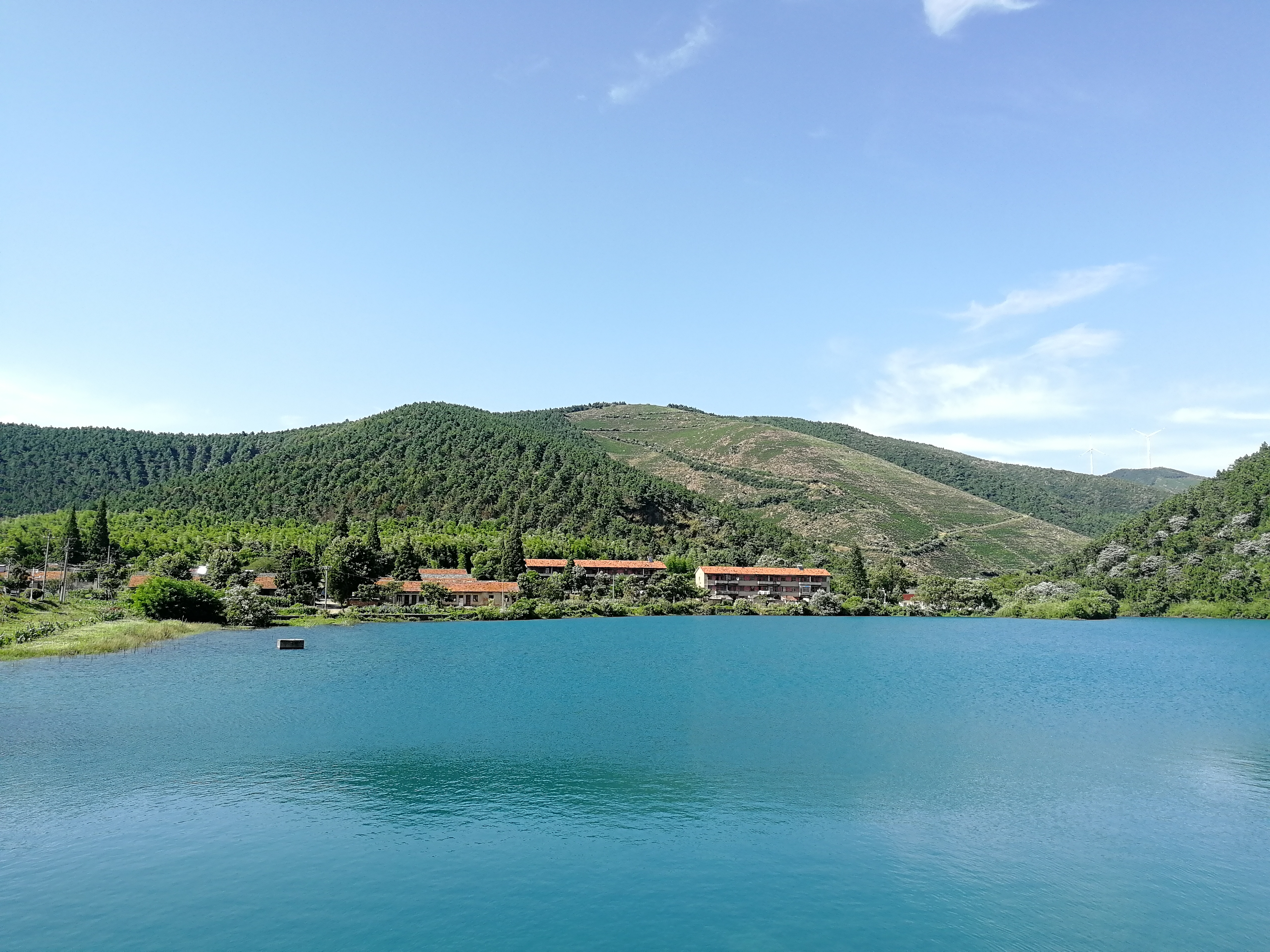
- Interactive map of Langxi
- Coordinates: 31°07′35″N 119°10′47″E
- Country: People's Republic of China
- Province: Anhui
- Prefecture-level city: Xuancheng

Area
  - Total: 1,104.8 km^{2} (426.6 sq mi)

Population (2019)
  - Total: 347,800
  - Density: 314.8/km^{2} (815.3/sq mi)
- Time zone: UTC+8 (China Standard)
- Postal code: 242199

Langxi County (simplified Chinese: 郎溪县; traditional Chinese: 郎溪縣; pinyin: Lángxī Xiàn) is a county in the southeast of Anhui Province, People's Republic of China, bordering Jiangsu Province to the north. It is under the jurisdiction of the prefecture-level city of Xuancheng. It has a population of 340,000 and an area of 1,105 km^{2} (427 sq mi). The government of Langxi County is located in Jianping Town.

Langxi County has jurisdiction over eight towns and nine townships.

== Administrative divisions ==
Langxi County is divided to 8 towns and 4 townships.

Towns

- Nanfeng (南丰镇)
- Xinfa (新发镇)
- Meizhu (梅渚镇)
- Taocheng (涛城镇)
- Shizi (十字镇)
- Biqiao (毕桥镇)
- Dongxia (东夏镇)
- Jianping (建平镇)

Townships

- Xingfu Township (幸福乡)
- Feili Township (飞里乡)
- Yaocun Township (姚村乡)
- Lingda Township (凌笪乡)

== Climate ==
Climate data for Langxi, elevation 17 m (56 ft), (1991–2020 normals, extremes 1981–present)
Month	Jan	Feb	Mar	Apr	May	Jun	Jul	Aug	Sep	Oct	Nov	Dec	Year
Record high °C (°F)	22.4 (72.3)	29.3 (84.7)	34.8 (94.6)	34.9 (94.8)	36.4 (97.5)	38.0 (100.4)	39.0 (102.2)	39.4 (102.9)	38.0 (100.4)	33.5 (92.3)	29.3 (84.7)	24.3 (75.7)	39.4 (102.9)
Mean daily maximum °C (°F)	7.9 (46.2)	10.7 (51.3)	15.5 (59.9)	21.9 (71.4)	27.0 (80.6)	29.4 (84.9)	33.1 (91.6)	32.5 (90.5)	28.3 (82.9)	23.2 (73.8)	17.1 (62.8)	10.5 (50.9)	21.4 (70.6)
Daily mean °C (°F)	3.7 (38.7)	6.1 (43.0)	10.5 (50.9)	16.6 (61.9)	21.9 (71.4)	25.2 (77.4)	28.7 (83.7)	28.2 (82.8)	23.8 (74.8)	18.2 (64.8)	12.0 (53.6)	5.8 (42.4)	16.7 (62.1)
Mean daily minimum °C (°F)	0.7 (33.3)	2.8 (37.0)	6.7 (44.1)	12.2 (54.0)	17.6 (63.7)	21.8 (71.2)	25.3 (77.5)	24.9 (76.8)	20.4 (68.7)	14.5 (58.1)	8.3 (46.9)	2.3 (36.1)	13.1 (55.6)
Record low °C (°F)	−9.8 (14.4)	−8.2 (17.2)	−3.7 (25.3)	1.6 (34.9)	9.0 (48.2)	13.3 (55.9)	19.2 (66.6)	18.5 (65.3)	10.8 (51.4)	2.4 (36.3)	−3.2 (26.2)	−11.2 (11.8)	−11.2 (11.8)
Average precipitation mm (inches)	72.7 (2.86)	71.2 (2.80)	109.1 (4.30)	100.6 (3.96)	119.8 (4.72)	217.4 (8.56)	195.0 (7.68)	133.5 (5.26)	86.0 (3.39)	61.6 (2.43)	58.3 (2.30)	45.6 (1.80)	1,270.8 (50.06)
Average precipitation days (≥ 0.1 mm)	11.1	10.8	13.2	11.4	11.9	13.3	12.6	11.8	8.9	8.3	9.4	8.3	131
Average snowy days	3.5	2.2	0.7	0	0	0	0	0	0	0	0.3	1.2	7.9
Average relative humidity (%)	78	76	74	72	72	78	79	80	80	77	78	77	77
Mean monthly sunshine hours	102.7	107.4	130.0	152.4	166.2	135.5	191.0	190.4	147.9	152.3	128.0	119.3	1,723.1
Percentage possible sunshine	32	34	35	39	39	32	45	47	40	43	41	38	39
Source: China Meteorological AdministrationSeptember Record High

== Transportation ==
The county is served by Langxi South railway station, situated near Shizi town.
