= Hanshan County =

Hanshan 含山县
- County
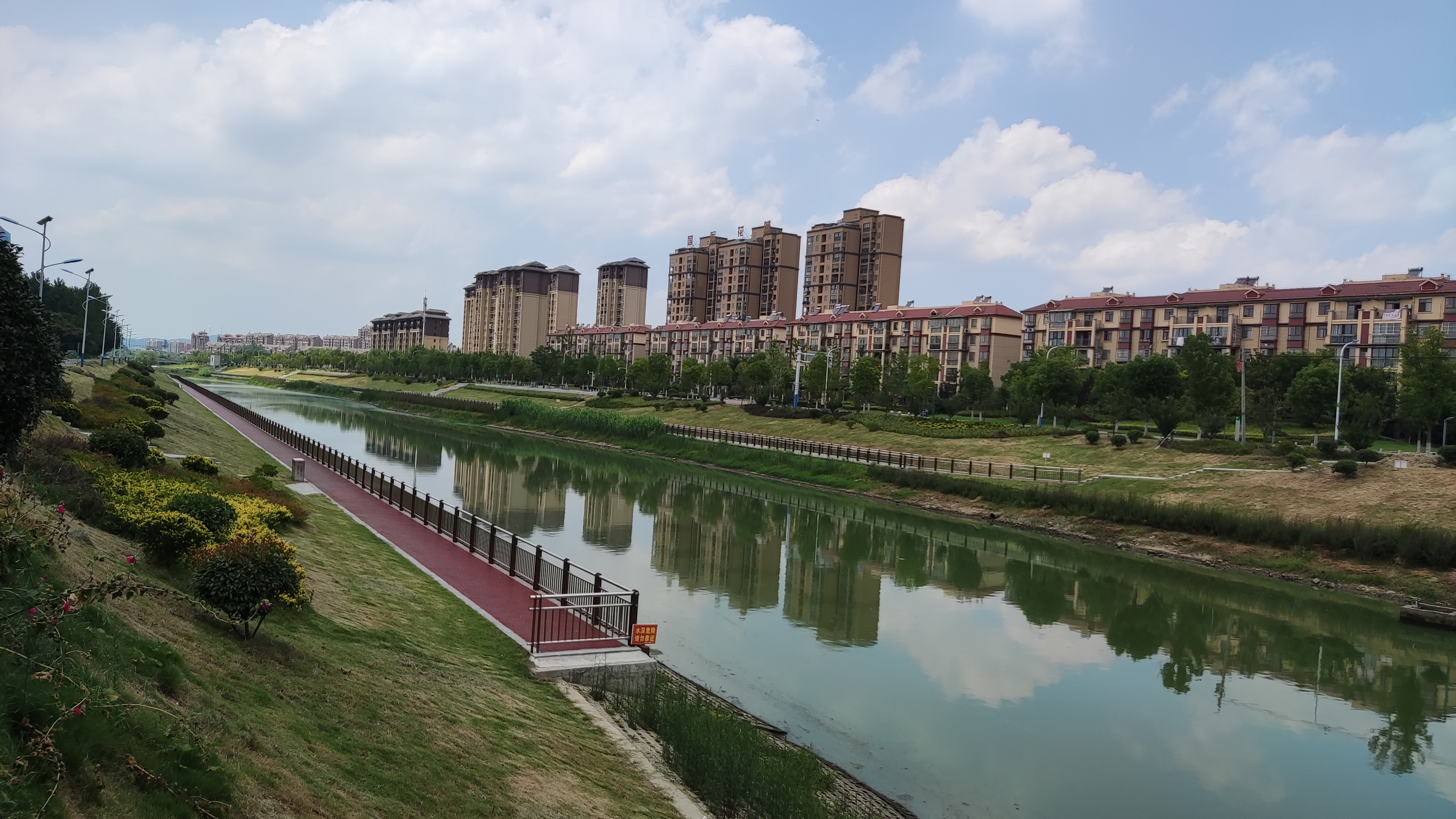
- Desheng Riverside in Hanshan County.

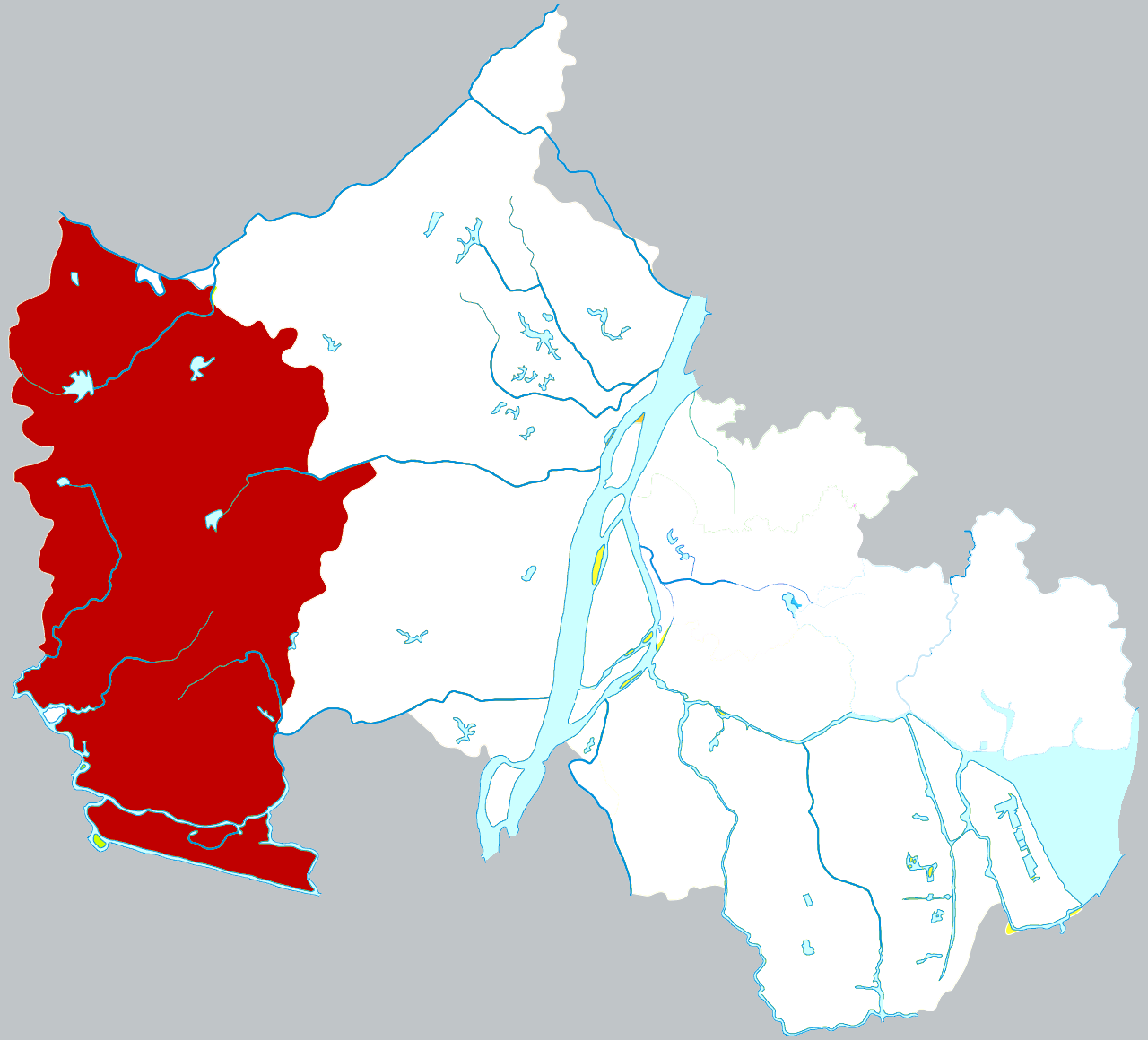
- Hanshan in Ma'anshan

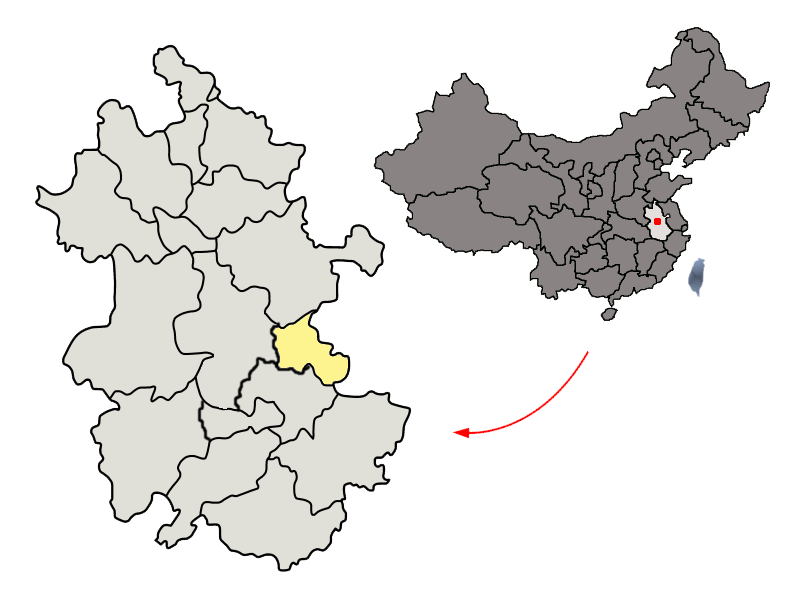
- Ma'anshan in Anhui
- Coordinates: 31°44′08″N 118°06′05″E
- Country: China
- Province: Anhui
- Prefecture-level city: Ma'anshan
- County seat: Huanfeng

Area
  - County: 1,025 km^{2} (396 sq mi)
  - Urban: 15.9 km^{2} (6.1 sq mi)

Population (2020)
  - County: 336,588
  - Density: 328.4/km^{2} (850.5/sq mi)
  - Urban: 126,600
- Time zone: UTC+8 (China Standard)
- Postal code: 238100
- Website: http://www.ahhs.gov.cn/

Hanshan County (simplified Chinese: 含山县; traditional Chinese: 含山縣; pinyin: Hánshān Xiàn) is a county in the east of Anhui Province, People's Republic of China under the jurisdiction of the prefecture-level city of Ma'anshan. It has a population of 336,588 in 2020 and an area of 1,028 square kilometres (397 mi^{2}). The government of Hanshan County is located in Huanfeng Town.

Hanshan County has jurisdiction over eight towns.

== Administrative divisions ==
Hanshan County has 8 towns.

8 Towns

- Huanfeng (环峰镇)
- Yuncao (运漕镇)
- Xianzong (仙踪镇)
- Qingxi (清溪镇)
- Lintou (林头镇)
- Tongzha (铜闸镇)
- Taochang (陶厂镇)
- Zhaoguan (昭关镇)

== Climate ==
Hanshan experiences a climate with four distinct seasons, characterized by hot, humid summers and cool, damp winters.

Climate data for Hanshan, elevation 26 m (85 ft), (1991–2020 normals, extremes 1981–present)
Month	Jan	Feb	Mar	Apr	May	Jun	Jul	Aug	Sep	Oct	Nov	Dec	Year
Record high °C (°F)	22.9 (73.2)	27.6 (81.7)	34.0 (93.2)	33.7 (92.7)	36.5 (97.7)	38.0 (100.4)	39.3 (102.7)	39.9 (103.8)	38.2 (100.8)	34.3 (93.7)	29.0 (84.2)	24.3 (75.7)	39.9 (103.8)
Mean daily maximum °C (°F)	7.4 (45.3)	10.2 (50.4)	15.3 (59.5)	21.7 (71.1)	26.9 (80.4)	29.4 (84.9)	32.6 (90.7)	32.1 (89.8)	28.2 (82.8)	22.9 (73.2)	16.6 (61.9)	10.1 (50.2)	21.1 (70.0)
Daily mean °C (°F)	2.9 (37.2)	5.4 (41.7)	10.0 (50.0)	16.2 (61.2)	21.5 (70.7)	25.0 (77.0)	28.3 (82.9)	27.6 (81.7)	23.3 (73.9)	17.5 (63.5)	11.1 (52.0)	5.0 (41.0)	16.2 (61.1)
Mean daily minimum °C (°F)	−0.4 (31.3)	1.7 (35.1)	5.9 (42.6)	11.4 (52.5)	17.0 (62.6)	21.4 (70.5)	25.0 (77.0)	24.4 (75.9)	19.8 (67.6)	13.5 (56.3)	7.0 (44.6)	1.3 (34.3)	12.3 (54.2)
Record low °C (°F)	−9.3 (15.3)	−13.5 (7.7)	−4.2 (24.4)	1.1 (34.0)	7.9 (46.2)	13.4 (56.1)	18.3 (64.9)	16.2 (61.2)	10.8 (51.4)	1.5 (34.7)	−5.3 (22.5)	−14.5 (5.9)	−14.5 (5.9)
Average precipitation mm (inches)	50.9 (2.00)	57.9 (2.28)	81.8 (3.22)	88.3 (3.48)	95.2 (3.75)	187.3 (7.37)	199.2 (7.84)	163.6 (6.44)	77.1 (3.04)	50.5 (1.99)	54.0 (2.13)	37.0 (1.46)	1,142.8 (45)
Average precipitation days (≥ 0.1 mm)	9.8	9.6	11.2	10.2	10.7	11.1	12.1	12.8	8.3	8.1	8.6	7.5	120
Average snowy days	3.7	2.2	0.7	0	0	0	0	0	0	0	0.5	1.2	8.3
Average relative humidity (%)	77	76	75	73	74	80	82	83	80	77	78	76	78
Mean monthly sunshine hours	114.9	115.7	143.2	168.7	176.9	148.6	192.2	184.8	151.8	158.6	140.3	134.5	1,830.2
Percentage possible sunshine	36	37	38	43	41	35	45	45	41	45	45	43	41
Source: China Meteorological Administration all-time January high

== Transportation ==
Hanshan South railway station is situated here.
