= Shangqiu East railway station =

Railway station in Shangqiu, Henan

Coordinates: 34.3321°N 115.7267°E

Shangqiu East 商丘东
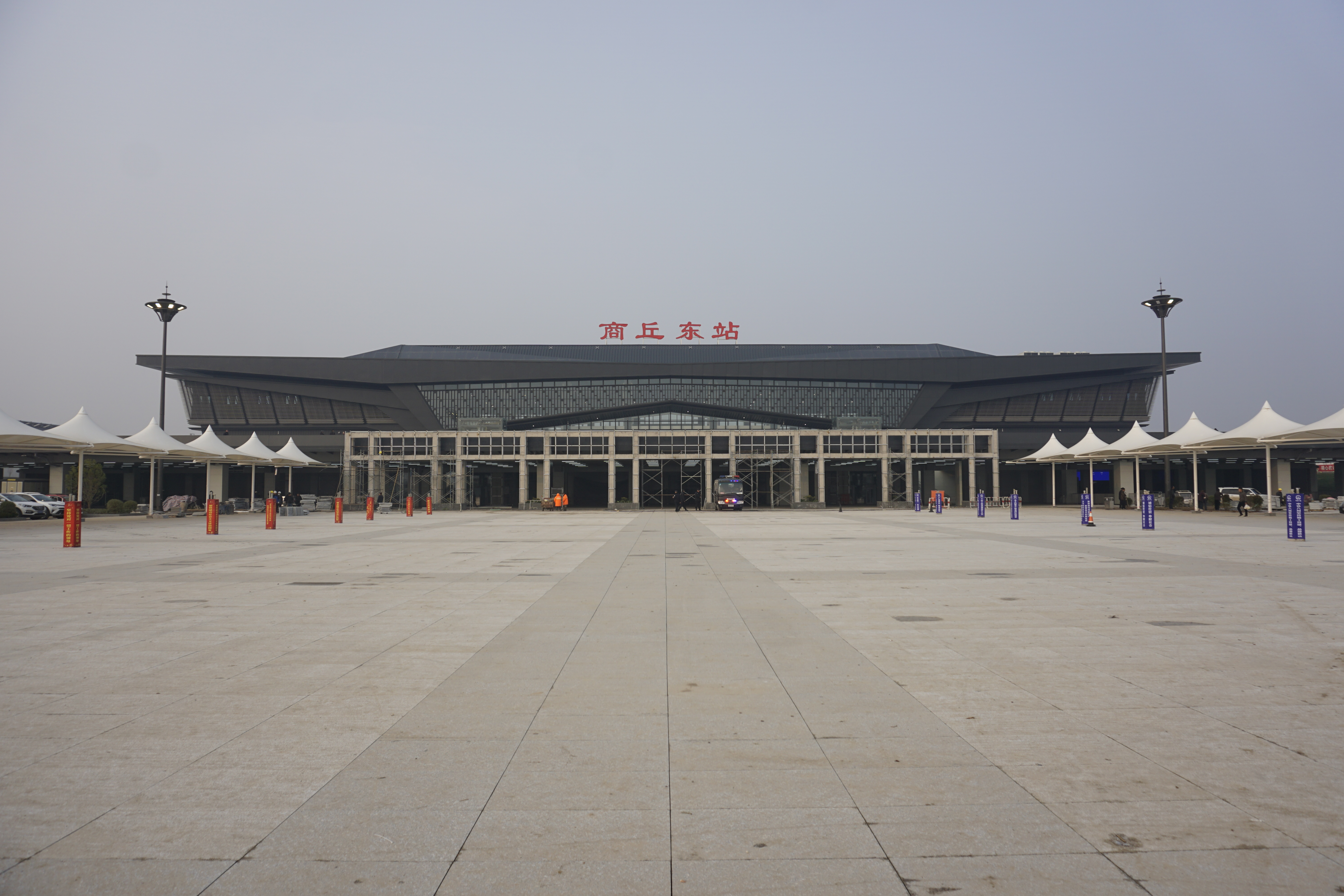

General information
- Location: Yucheng County, Shangqiu, Henan; China
- Line: Shangqiu–Hangzhou high-speed railway

History
- Opened: December 1, 2019
Location

Shangqiu East railway station (Chinese: 商丘东站) is a railway station on the Shangqiu–Hangzhou high-speed railway in Shangqiu, Henan, China. Opened on 1 December 2019, it is the second high-speed rail station in the city after Shangqiu railway station.

| Preceding station | China Railway High-speed | Following station |
|---|---|---|
| Shangqiu Terminus | Shangqiu–Hangzhou high-speed railway | Lumiao towards Tonglu |
