= Changlinhe railway station =

Railway station in Hefei, Anhui

Changlinhe 长临河

General information
- Location: Changlinhe, Feidong County, Hefei, Anhui; China
- Coordinates: 31°42′2.03″N 117°28′40.87″E
- Line: Hefei–Fuzhou high-speed railway

History
- Opened: 28 June 2015
Location

Changlinhe railway station (Chinese: 长临河站) is a railway station in Changlinhe, Feidong County, Hefei, Anhui, China. It is an intermediate stop on the Hefei–Fuzhou high-speed railway. It opened with the line on 28 June 2015. It is the closest high-speed rail station to Chao Lake.

Preceding station	China Railway High-speed	Following station
Hefei South Terminus	Hefei–Fuzhou high-speed railway	Chaohu East towards Fuzhou
