= Yongcheng North railway station =

Railway station in Shangqiu, China

Yongchengbei 永城北
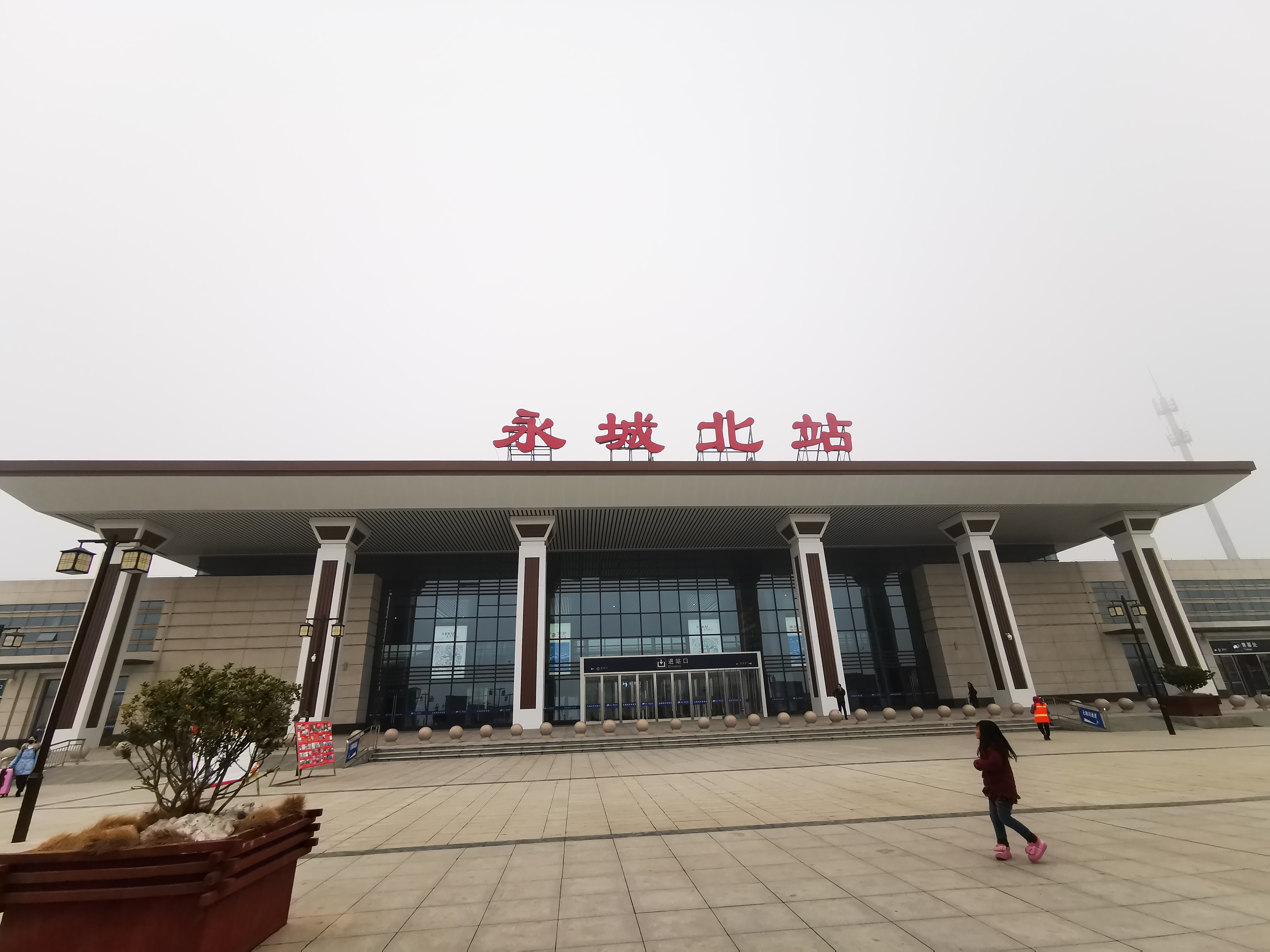

General information
- Other names: Yongcheng North
- Location: Yongcheng, Shangqiu, Henan; China
- Coordinates: 34.2165°N 116.5153°E
- Operator: CR Shanghai
- Line: Xuzhou–Lanzhou High-Speed Railway
- Platforms: 2
- Tracks: 4

History
- Opened: 10 September 2016

Services
Preceding station	China Railway High-speed	Following station
Xiaoxian North towards Xuzhou East	Xuzhou–Lanzhou high-speed railway	Dangshan South towards Lanzhou West
Location

Yongcheng North railway station (Chinese: 永城北站) is a railway station of Zhengzhou–Xuzhou High-Speed Railway in Mangshan Town, Yongcheng, Shangqiu, Henan, China. The station started operation on 10 September 2016, together with the railway.

The station is 35 kilometres (22 mi) from Yongcheng downtown, and 3.5 kilometres (2.2 mi) from Mangdang Mountain scenic area.
