= Dangshan South railway station =

Railway station in Suzhou, Anhui, China

Dangshannan 砀山南
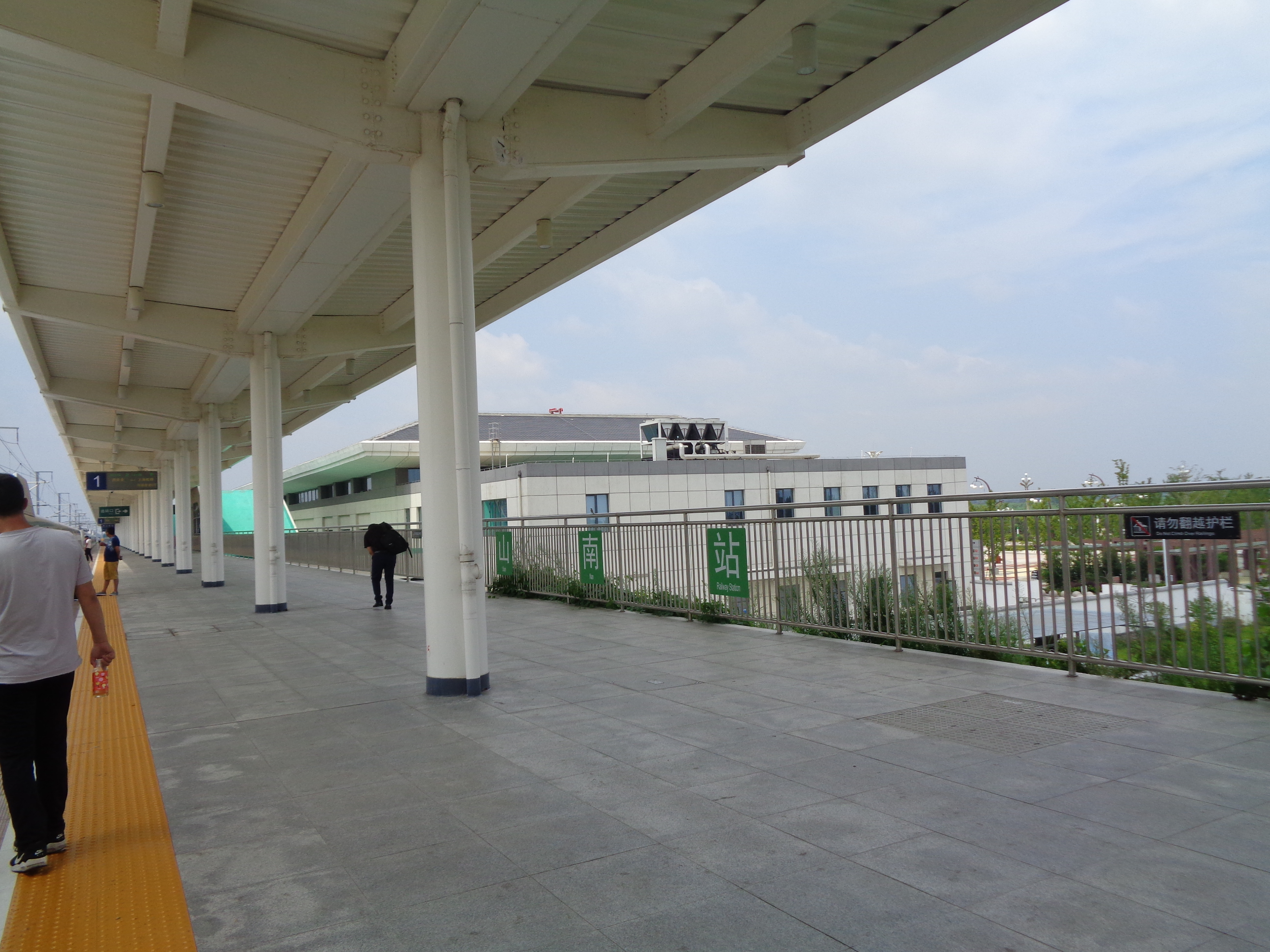

General information
- Other names: Dangshan South
- Location: Dangshan County, Suzhou, Anhui; China
- Coordinates: 34.3879°N 116.2983°E
- Operator: CR Shanghai
- Line: Xuzhou–Lanzhou High-Speed Railway
- Platforms: 2
- Tracks: 4

History
- Opened: 10 September 2016

Services
Preceding station	China Railway High-speed	Following station
Yongcheng North towards Xuzhou East	Xuzhou–Lanzhou high-speed railway	Shangqiu towards Lanzhou West
Location

Dangshan South railway station (Chinese: 砀山南站) is a railway station on the Zhengzhou–Xuzhou High-Speed Railway in Dangshan County, Suzhou, Anhui, China. The station started operation on 10 September 2016, together with the Railway.
