= Bozhou railway station =

Railway station in Bozhou, Anhui, China

Bozhou 亳州
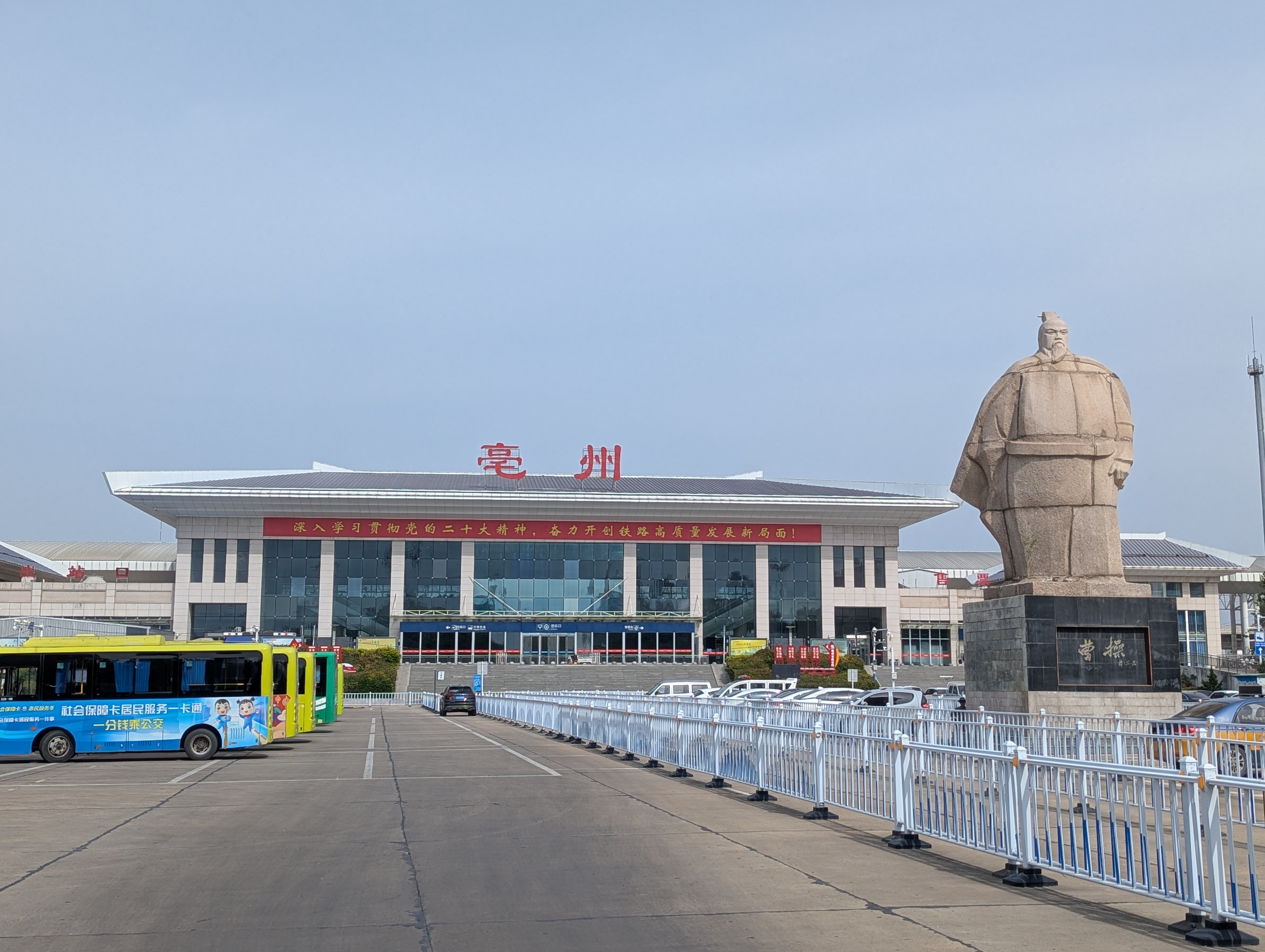

General information
- Location: Qiaocheng District, Bozhou, Anhui; China
- Coordinates: 33°50′57″N 115°47′33″E
- Operator: CR Shanghai
- Line: Beijing–Kowloon railway
- Platforms: 2

Other information
- Station code: 24986 (TMIS code); BZH (telegraph code); BZH (Pinyin code)
- Classification: Class 2 station (二等站)

History
- Opened: 1992
Location

Bozhou railway station (Chinese: 亳州站) is a railway station in Qiaocheng District, Bozhou, Anhui, China. It serves the Beijing–Kowloon railway.

== History ==
The station opened in 1992. From 2008 to 2010, the railway station was rebuilt and electrified.

| Preceding station | China Railway | Following station |
|---|---|---|
| Wanglou towards Beijing West | Beijing–Kowloon railway | Youheji towards Hung Hom |
