= Shangqiu–Hangzhou high-speed railway =

High-speed rail line in southeastern China

Shangqiu–Hefei–Hangzhou high-speed railway
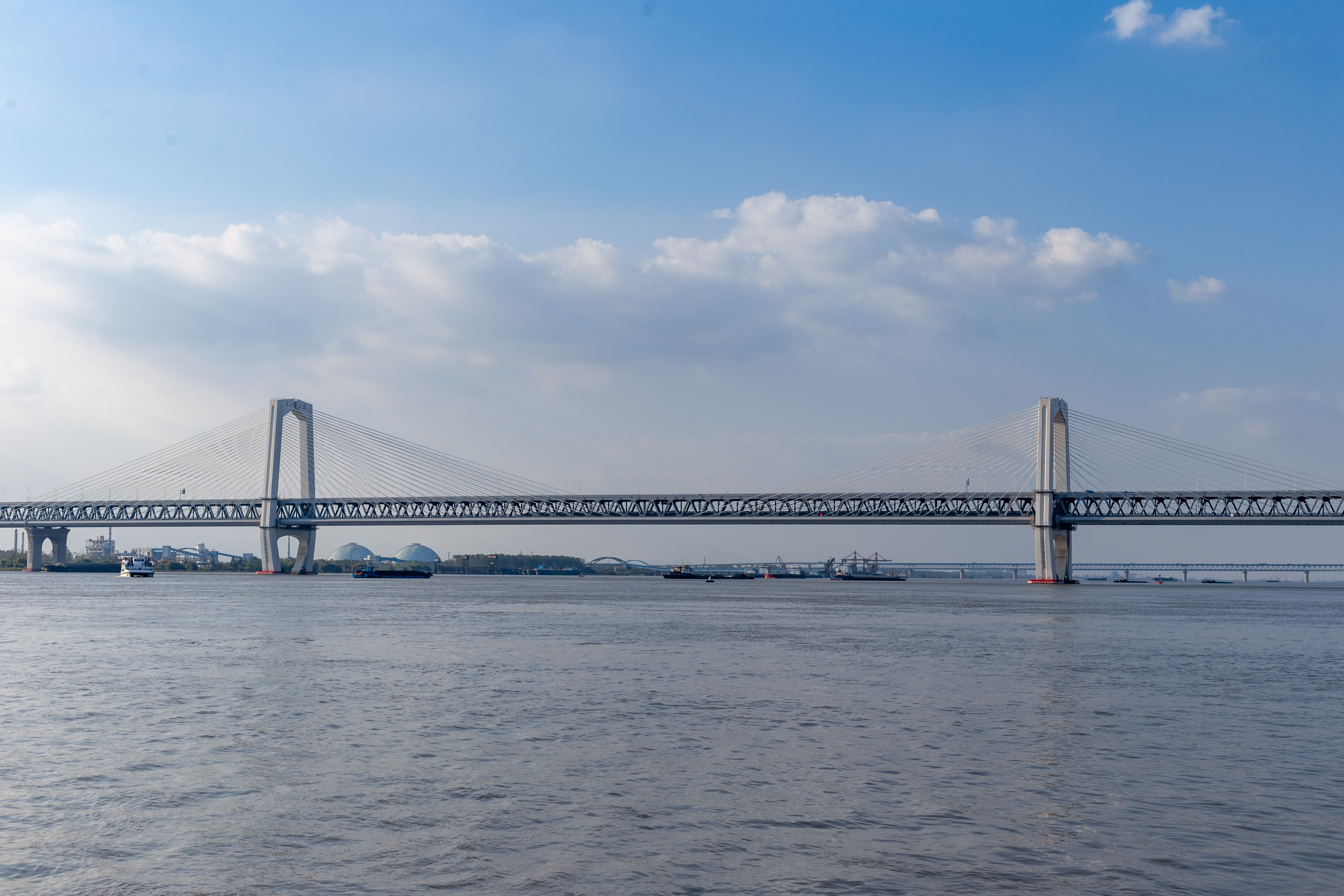
- Third Wuhu Yangtze Bridge in Wuhu

Overview
- Native name: 商合杭高速铁路
- Status: Operational
- Owner: CR Zhengzhou; CR Shanghai
- Locale: Henan province; Anhui province; Zhejiang province
- Termini: Shangqiu; Tonglu
- Stations: 22

Service
- Type: High-speed rail
- System: China Railway High-speed
- Operator(s): CR Zhengzhou; CR Shanghai

History
- Opened: 1 December 2019 (Shangqiu - Hefei); 28 June 2020 (Hefei - Huzhou); 22 September 2022 (Huzhou - Tonglu)

Technical
- Line length: 798 km (496 mi)
- Track gauge: 1,435 mm (4 ft 8 1/2 in) standard gauge
- Electrification: 25 kV 50 Hz AC (Overhead line)
- Operating speed: 350 km/h (217 mph)
- Maximum incline: 2%

The Shangqiu–Hefei–Hangzhou high-speed railway, or Shanghehang high-speed railway, is a high-speed railway in China. It opened in three sections from 2019 to 2022.

== History ==
The Shangqiu to Hefei section begun operation on 1 December 2019. The Hefei to Huzhou section began operation on 28 June 2020. The section from Huzhou to Tonglu in Hangzhou (formerly known as Huzhou–Hangzhou high-speed railway) opened on 22 September 2022.

== Route ==
The line runs parallel to the Hefei–Bengbu high-speed railway between Shuijiahu and Hefei South.

== Stations ==
Station Name	Chinese	Metro transfers/connections	Location	
Shangqiu	商丘		Shangqiu	Henan
Shangqiu East	商丘东		Shangqiu	Henan
Lumiao	芦庙		Bozhou	Anhui
Bozhou South	亳州南		Bozhou	Anhui
Gucheng East	古城东		Bozhou	Anhui
Taihe East	太和东		Fuyang	Anhui
Fuyang West	阜阳西		Fuyang	Anhui
Yingshang North	颍上北		Fuyang	Anhui
Fengtai South	凤台南		Huainan	Anhui
Shouxian	寿县		Huainan	Anhui
Huainan South	淮南南		Huainan	Anhui
Shuijiahu	水家湖		Hefei	Anhui
Hefei Beicheng	合肥北城		Hefei	Anhui
Hefei South	合肥南	1 4 5	Hefei	Anhui
Feidong	肥东		Hefei	Anhui
Zhegao	柘皋		Hefei	Anhui
Chaohu East	巢湖东		Hefei	Anhui
Hanshan South	含山南		Ma'anshan	Anhui
Wuhu North	芜湖北		Wuhu	Anhui
Wuhu	芜湖	2	Wuhu	Anhui
Wuhu South	芜湖南	1	Wuhu	Anhui
Wanzhi South	湾沚南		Wuhu	Anhui
Xuancheng	宣城		Xuancheng	Anhui
Langxi South	郎溪南		Xuancheng	Anhui
Guangde South	广德南		Xuancheng	Anhui
Anji	安吉		Huzhou	Zhejiang
Huzhou	湖州		Huzhou	Zhejiang
Deqing	德清		Huzhou	Zhejiang
Hangzhou West	杭州西	3 19	Hangzhou	Zhejiang
Fuyang West	富阳西		Hangzhou	Zhejiang
Tonglu East	桐庐东		Hangzhou	Zhejiang
Tonglu	桐庐		Hangzhou	Zhejiang
