= Shangqiu railway station =

Railway station in Shangqiu, Henan, China

Shangqiu 商丘
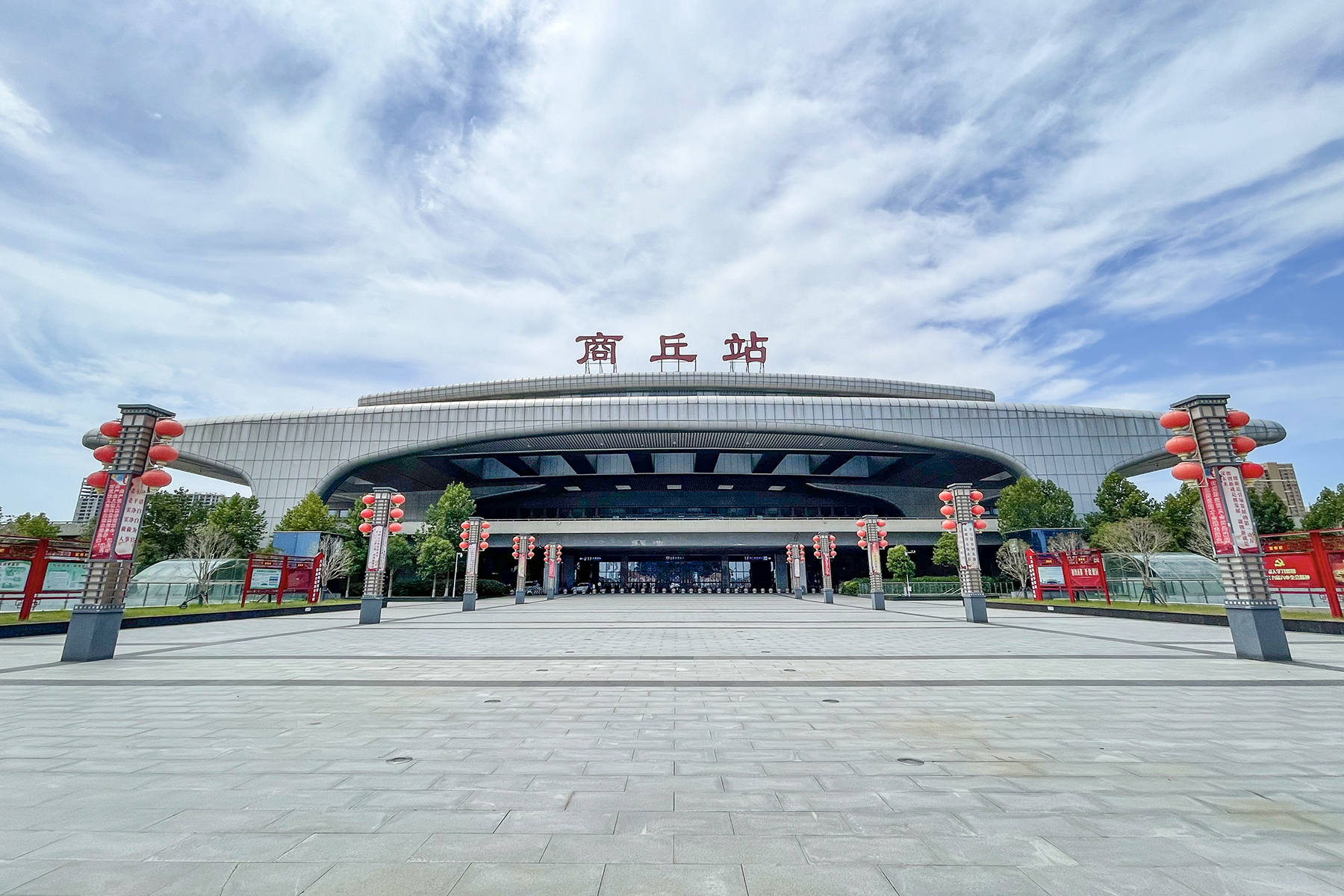
- North station building

General information
- Location: 59 Zhanqian Road; Liangyuan District, Shangqiu, Henan; China
- Coordinates: 34°26′39.23″N 115°39′25.26″E
- Operator: CR Zhengzhou
- Lines: China Railway: Longhai Railway; China Railway High-speed: Xuzhou–Lanzhou High-Speed Railway; Beijing–Shangqiu high-speed railway (under construction)
- Platforms: 16
- Tracks: 23
- Connections: Bus terminal

Other information
- Station code: 38702 (TMIS code); SQF (telegraph code); SQI (Pinyin code)
- Classification: Top Class station (特等站)

History
- Opened: 1915
- Former names: Zhuji (Chinese: 朱集); Guide (Chinese: 归德); Shangqiu County (Chinese: 商丘县)
Location
- Location within Henan Location within China

The Shangqiu railway station (Chinese: 商丘站) is a railway station on Longhai railway and Xuzhou–Lanzhou high-speed railway in Shangqiu, Henan, China.

== History ==
The history of the station dates back to 1912, when the French engineers responsible for route selection of the Kaifeng–Xuzhou section of Longhai railway began site survey just outside the north city gate of Guide (now Shangqiu). Since local gentries strongly opposed to the station site for the reason of Feng shui, the site of the station was moved about 7.5 km north and was named as Zhuji railway station (Chinese: 朱集车站). Construction began in 1913, with a French-style station building covering an area of 283 square metres (3,050 sq ft) and a 400 metres (1,300 ft) long platform. The station became operational in 1915, with the completion of the Kaifeng–Xuzhou railway

The name of the station was later changed to Guide railway station (Chinese: 归德车站), after the former name of Shangqiu, and Shangqiu County railway station (Chinese: 商丘县车站). It was changed to its current name in 1933.

The south station building, covering an area of 5,156 square metres (55,500 sq ft), was opened in 1984.

The station was expanded and renovated for the opening of Xuzhou–Lanzhou high-speed railway in 2016, with a new north station building. The north station building has an area of 15,995 square metres (172,170 sq ft).

== Future development ==
The station is planned to be connected with the Shangqiu–Hangzhou high-speed railway and Beijing–Shangqiu high-speed railway in the future.

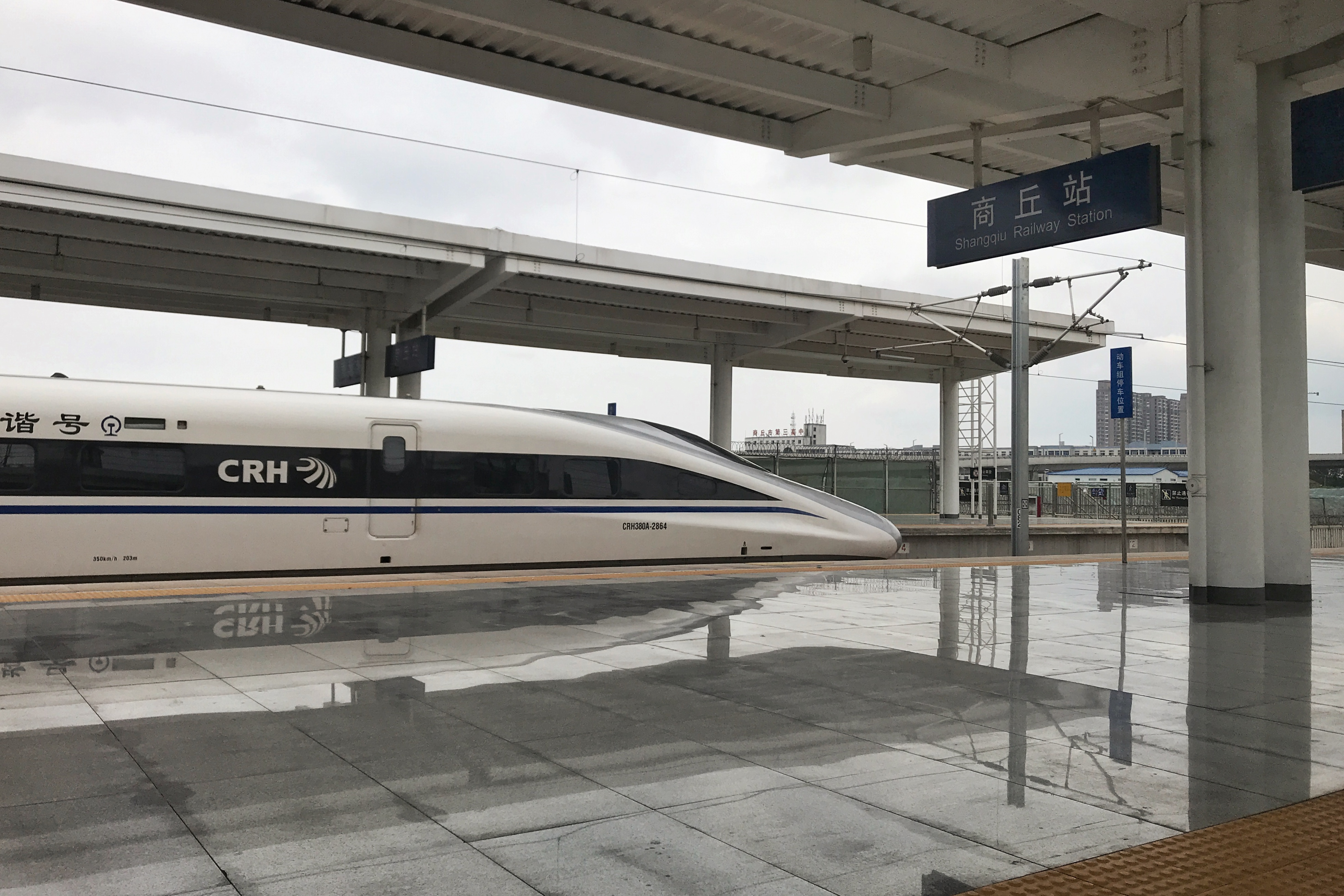
Platform of the station

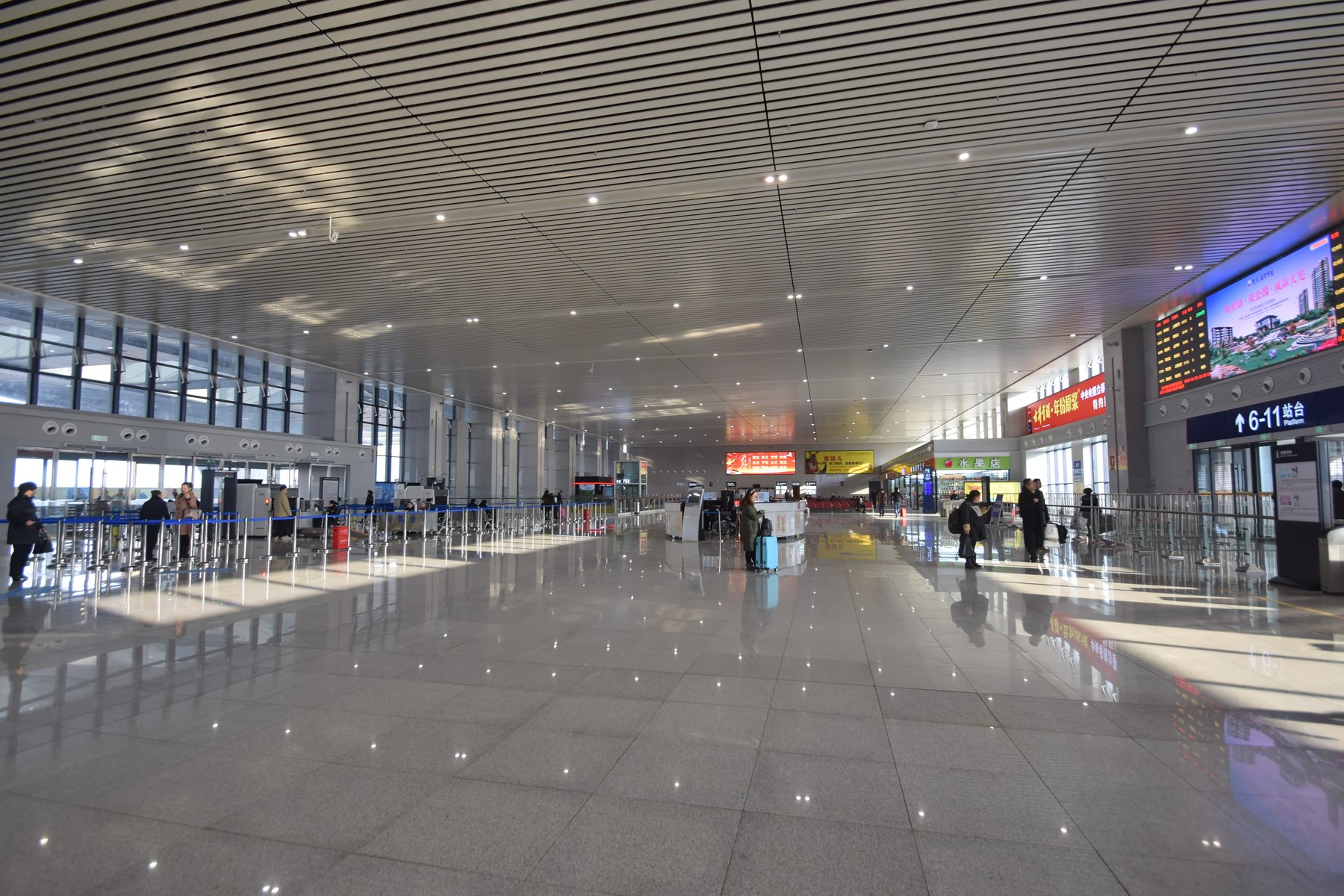
Waiting hall in north station building

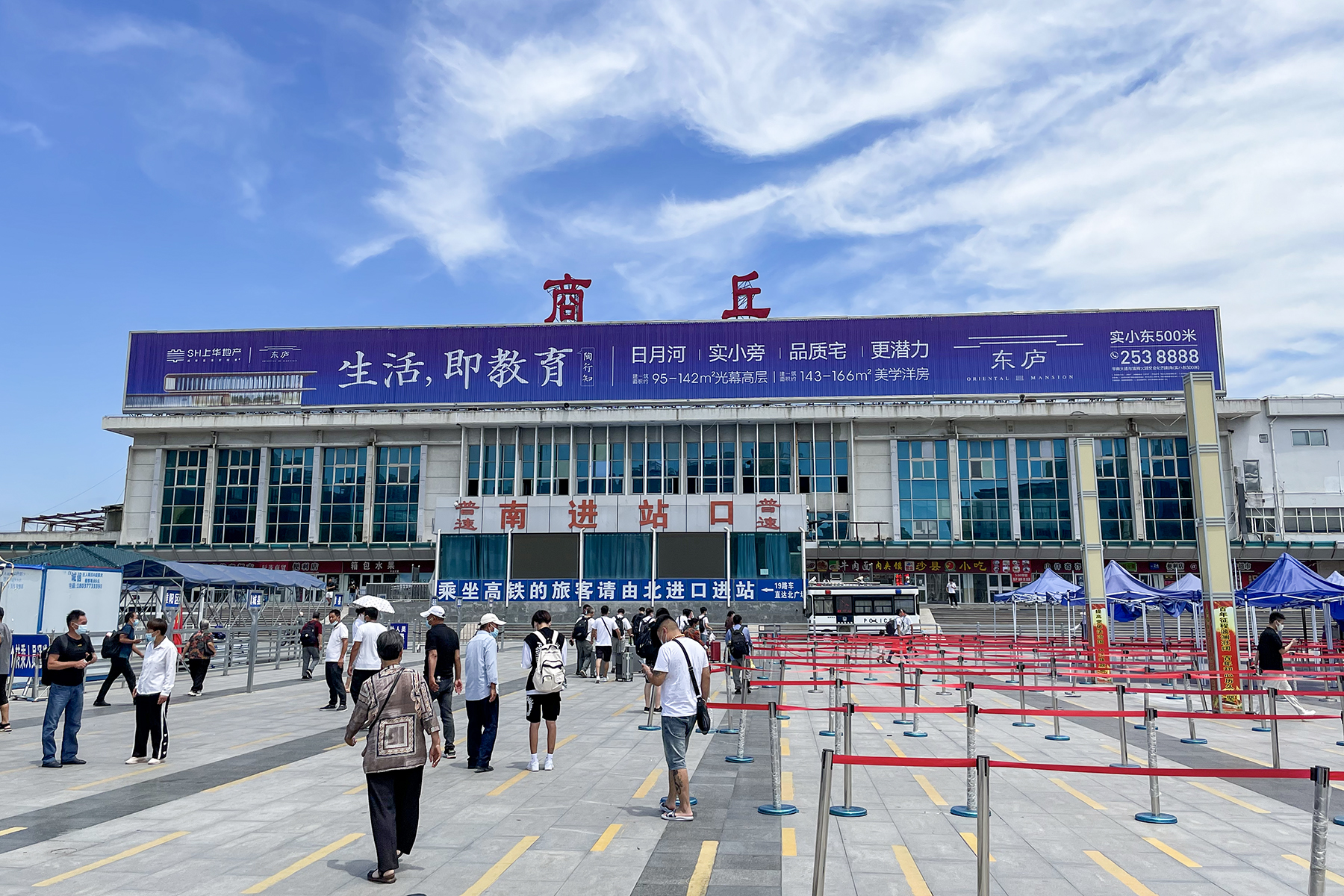
South station building

Preceding station	China Railway	Following station
Yuchengxian towards Lianyungang East	Longhai railway	Ninglingxian towards Lanzhou
Preceding station	China Railway High-speed	Following station
Dangshan South towards Lianyungang	Eurasia Continental Bridge corridor	Minquan North towards Ürümqi
Terminus	Shangqiu–Hangzhou high-speed railway	Shangqiu East towards Tonglu
