= Tonglu railway station =

Railway station in Hangzhou, Zhejiang

Tonglu 桐庐
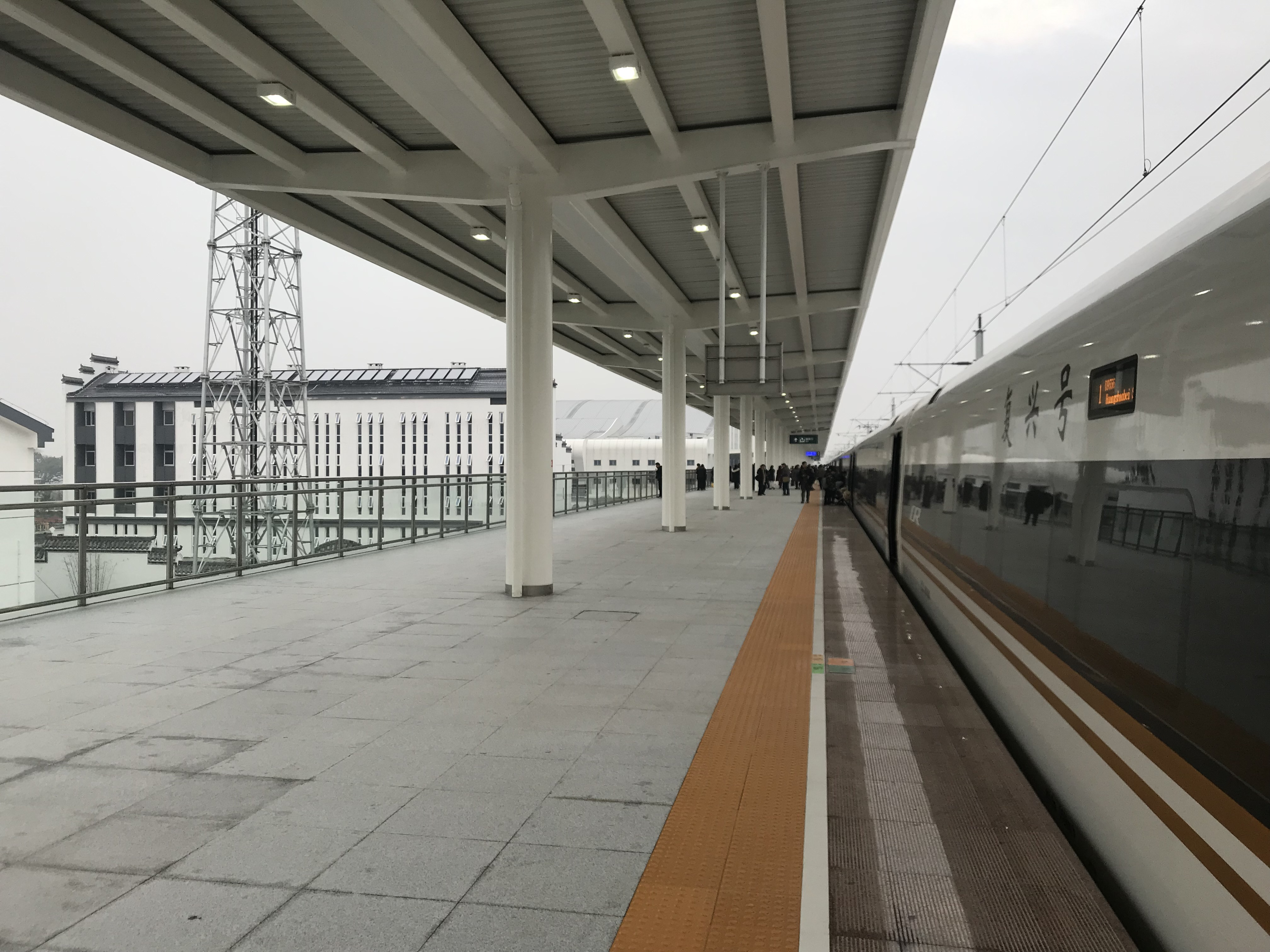

General information
- Location: Tonglu County, Hangzhou, Zhejiang; China
- Coordinates: 29°47′30″N 119°43′38″E
- Lines: Hangzhou–Huangshan intercity railway; Shangqiu–Hangzhou high-speed railway (Huzhou–Hangzhou section)

History
- Opened: 25 December 2018
Location

Tonglu railway station (Chinese: 桐庐站; pinyin: Tónglú Zhàn; Wade–Giles: T'ung‑lu Chêan) is a railway station in Tonglu County, Hangzhou, Zhejiang, China. It opened on 25 December 2018 along with the Hangzhou–Huangshan intercity railway. It is also the southern terminus of the Shangqiu–Hangzhou high-speed railway (Huzhou–Hangzhou section).

Preceding station	China Railway High-speed	Following station
Fuyang towards Hangzhou East	Hangzhou–Huangshan intercity railway	Jiande towards Huangshan North
Tonglu East towards Shangqiu	Shangqiu–Hangzhou high-speed railway	Terminus
