= Wuhu railway station =

Railway station in Wuhu, Anhui

Wuhu 芜湖
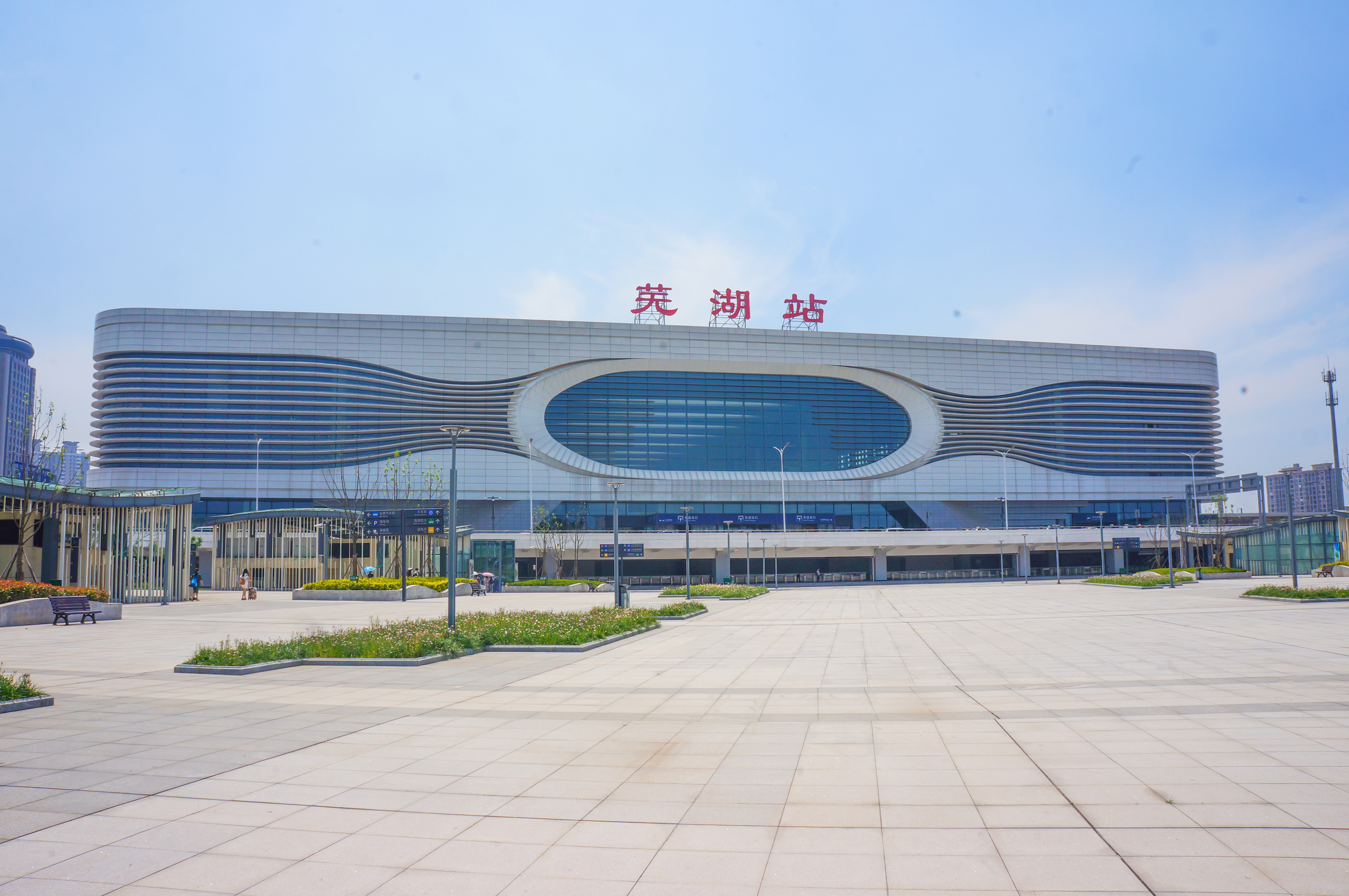

General information
- Location: Jinghu District, Wuhu, Anhui; China
- Coordinates: 31.3498°N 118.3860°E
- Lines: Huainan railway Anhui–Jiangxi railway Nanjing–Tongling railway Nanjing–Anqing intercity railway Shangqiu–Hangzhou high-speed railway

History
- Opened: 1933
Location

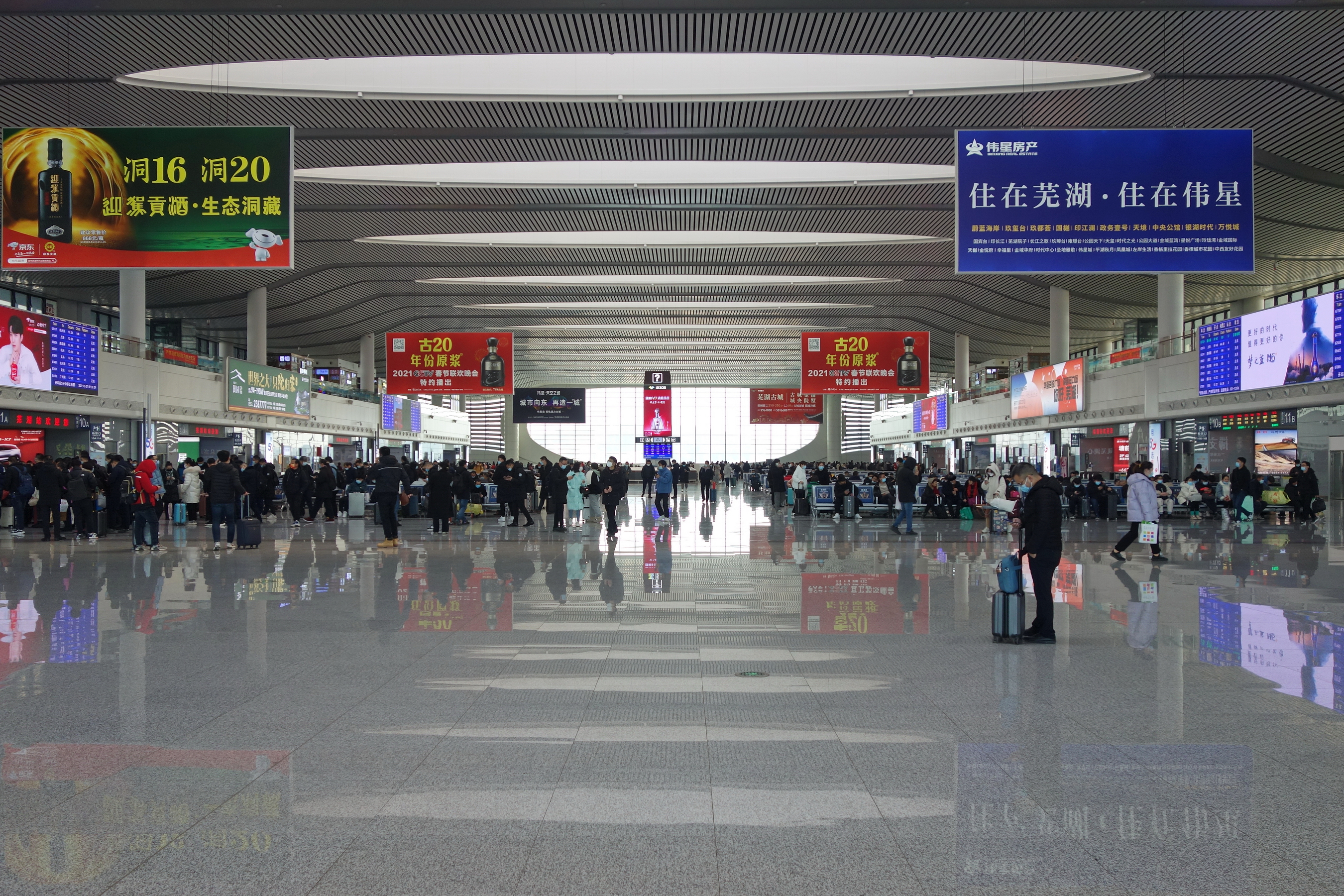
Interior of Wuhu Railway Station

Wuhu railway station (Chinese: 芜湖站) is a railway station in Jinghu District, Wuhu, Anhui, China. It is situated at the intersection of multiple conventional and high-speed lines.

The station is the northern terminus of the Anhui–Jiangxi railway and the southern terminus of the Huainan railway and the Nanjing-Wuhu Railway . It is a stop on the Nanjing–Tongling railway, the Nanjing–Anqing intercity railway, and the Shangqiu–Hangzhou high-speed railway.

== History ==
The first railway station was built in Wuhu with the Anhui–Jiangxi railway and opened in 1933. In 1977, a new station was built on the present site of Wuhu railway station to meet growing demand. This station was rebuilt in 1992. On 20 August 2013, the complete reconstruction of the station began.

== Monorail ==
An interchange with Line 2 of Wuhu Rail Transit opened on December 28, 2021.

Preceding station	China Railway High-speed	Following station
Dangtu East towards Nanjing South	Nanjing–Anqing intercity railway	Wuhu South towards Anqing
Wuhu North towards Shangqiu	Shangqiu–Hangzhou high-speed railway	Wuhu South towards Tonglu
