= Nanjing–Anqing intercity railway =

Railway line in China

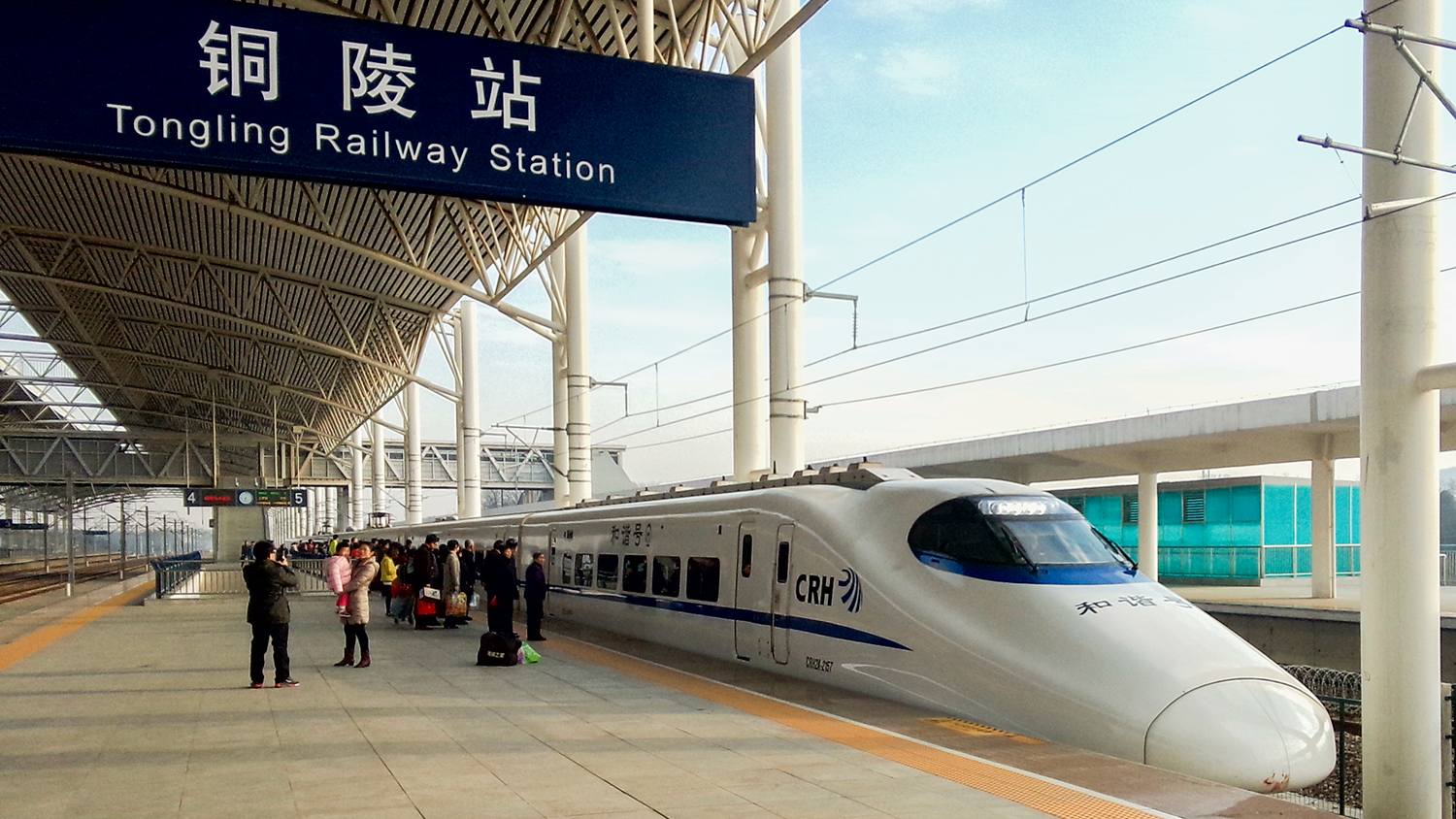
- Nanjing–Anqing intercity railway

Overview
- Native name: 宁安城际铁路
- Status: Operational
- Owner: CR Shanghai
- Locale: Jiangsu province; Anhui province
- Termini: Nanjing South; Anqing

Service
- Type: High-speed rail
- System: China Railway High-speed
- Operator: CR Shanghai

History
- Opened: December 6, 2015; 10 years ago

Technical
- Line length: 258 km (160 mi) (main line)
- Track gauge: 1,435 mm (4 ft 8 1/2 in) standard gauge
- Electrification: 25 kV 50 Hz AC (Overhead line)
- Operating speed: 250 km/h (155 mph)

Nanjing–Anqing intercity railway
- Simplified Chinese: 宁安城际铁路
- Traditional Chinese: 寧安城際鐵路
Transcriptions
Standard Mandarin
- Hanyu Pinyin: Níng Ān Chéng Jì Tiělù

The Nanjing–Anqing intercity railway (Chinese: 宁安城际铁路) is a high-speed rail, passenger-dedicated line between cities of Nanjing, Jiangsu Province and Anqing, Anhui Province, in China. Construction of the 258-kilometre (160 mi) railway began in January 2010, and the line was opened on 6 December 2015.

This railway is a branch of the Beijing–Shanghai high-speed railway. The route runs parallel to the Yangtze River, and passes through Ma'anshan, Wuhu, Tongling, and Chizhou, 33 km (21 mi) of the railway is located in Jiangsu, with 225 km (140 mi) in Anhui. with a total of ten stations.

The total investment was predicted to be 25.702 billion RMB, provided by the Railway departments of Jiangsu province and Anhui province.

Most of the line runs along the southern bank of the Yangtze, but Anqing is located on the northern side of the river. The Anqing Railway Bridge was built 22 km (14 mi) before Anqing station. The bridge also serves the Fuyang–Jingdezhen Railway.

== Operation ==
The capacity is estimated to be about 125 pairs of trains each day. The trains have a top speed of 250 kilometres per hour (160 mph). The railway cut travel time between Nanjing and Anqing from 8 hours to 1.5 hours. It also allows passengers to travel between Anqing and Shanghai in 3 hours, compared to the previous 12 hours. The railway is connected to the Yangtze River Delta region's railway network.

Trains are expected to be in service each day from 06:00 to 12:00. 60 pairs of trains will be in operation with a minimum interval between trains of 4 minutes, and an average interval of 15 minutes.

The cost to passengers will be 0.4 to 0.5 RMB (4 to 5 mao) per kilometre.

== Stations ==
The railway serves 10 stations along its route.

Station	Location	Notes
Jiangsu
Nanjing South	Nanjing	1 3 S1 S3
Jiangning West	Nanjing	
Anhui
Ma'anshan East	Ma'anshan	
Dangtu East	Ma'anshan	
Wuhu	Jinghu District, Wuhu	2
Wuhu South	Yijiang District, Wuhu	1
Fanchang West	Fanchang District, Wuhu	
Tongling	Tongling	
Chizhou	Chizhou	
Anqing	Anqing	Terminus

== See also ==
- High-speed rail in China
- Nanjing–Tongling Railway and Tongling–Jiujiang Railway, an older railway line along a parallel route
