= Hukou railway station (Jiangxi) =

Railway station in Jiujiang, Jiangxi

Hukou 湖口
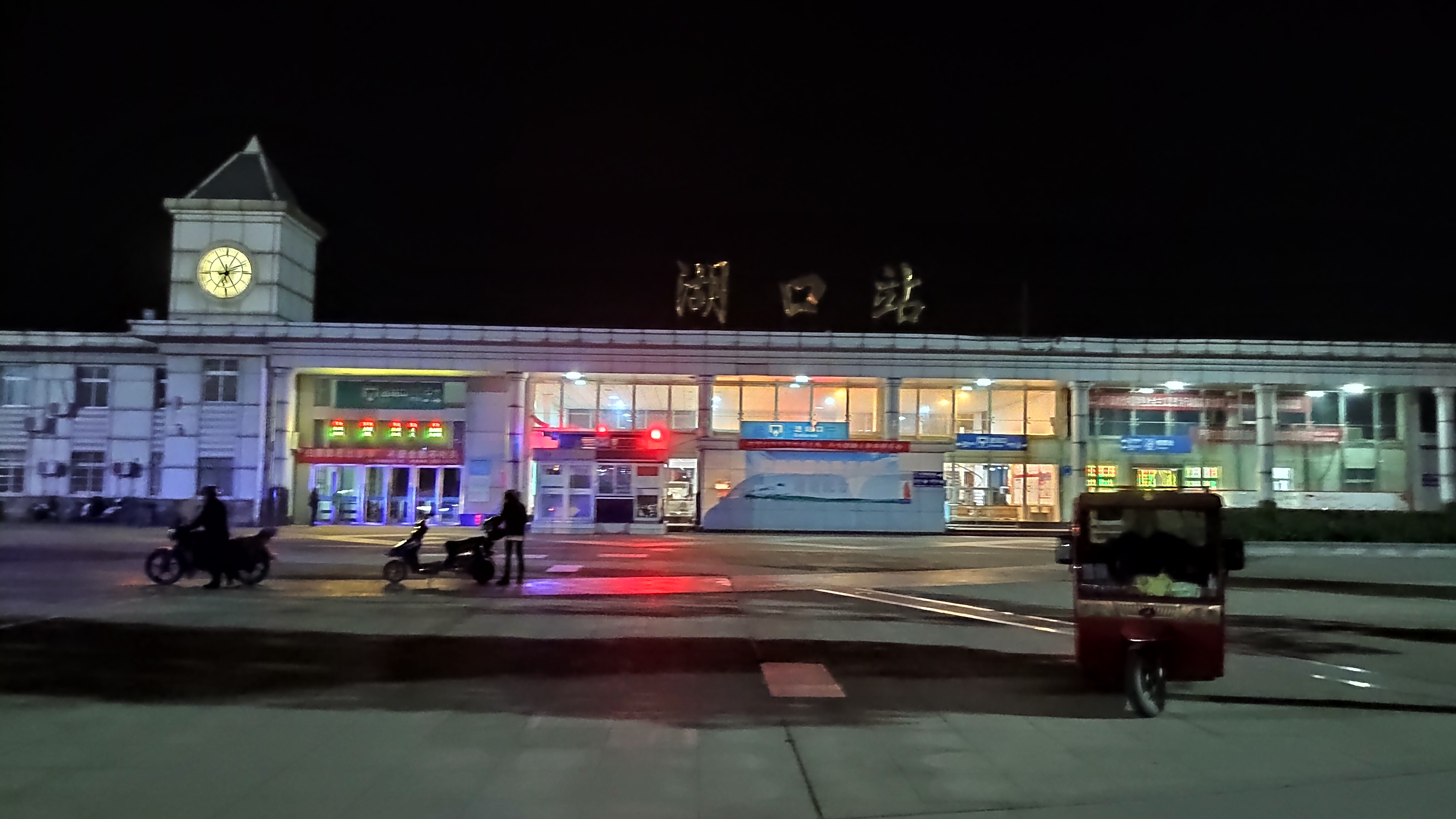

General information
- Location: Hukou County, Jiujiang, Jiangxi; China
- Coordinates: 29°43′54″N 116°16′47″E
- Lines: Jiujiang–Quzhou railway; Tongling–Jiujiang railway

History
- Opened: 1 July 2008
Location

Hukou railway station (Chinese: 湖口站) is a railway station in Hukou County, Jiujiang, Jiangxi, China.

The station opened on 1 July 2008. In 2015, reconstruction of the station began as part of the construction of the Jiujiang–Quzhou railway. The station was expanded and the platforms were raised.

Preceding station	China Railway High-speed	Following station
Jiujiang Terminus	Jiujiang–Quzhou railway	Duchang towards Quzhou
Preceding station	China Railway	Following station
Pengze towards Tongling	Tongling–Jiujiang railway	Jiujiang Terminus
