= Pengze railway station =

Railway station on the Tongling–Jiujiang railway in Jiangxi, China

Pengze 彭泽
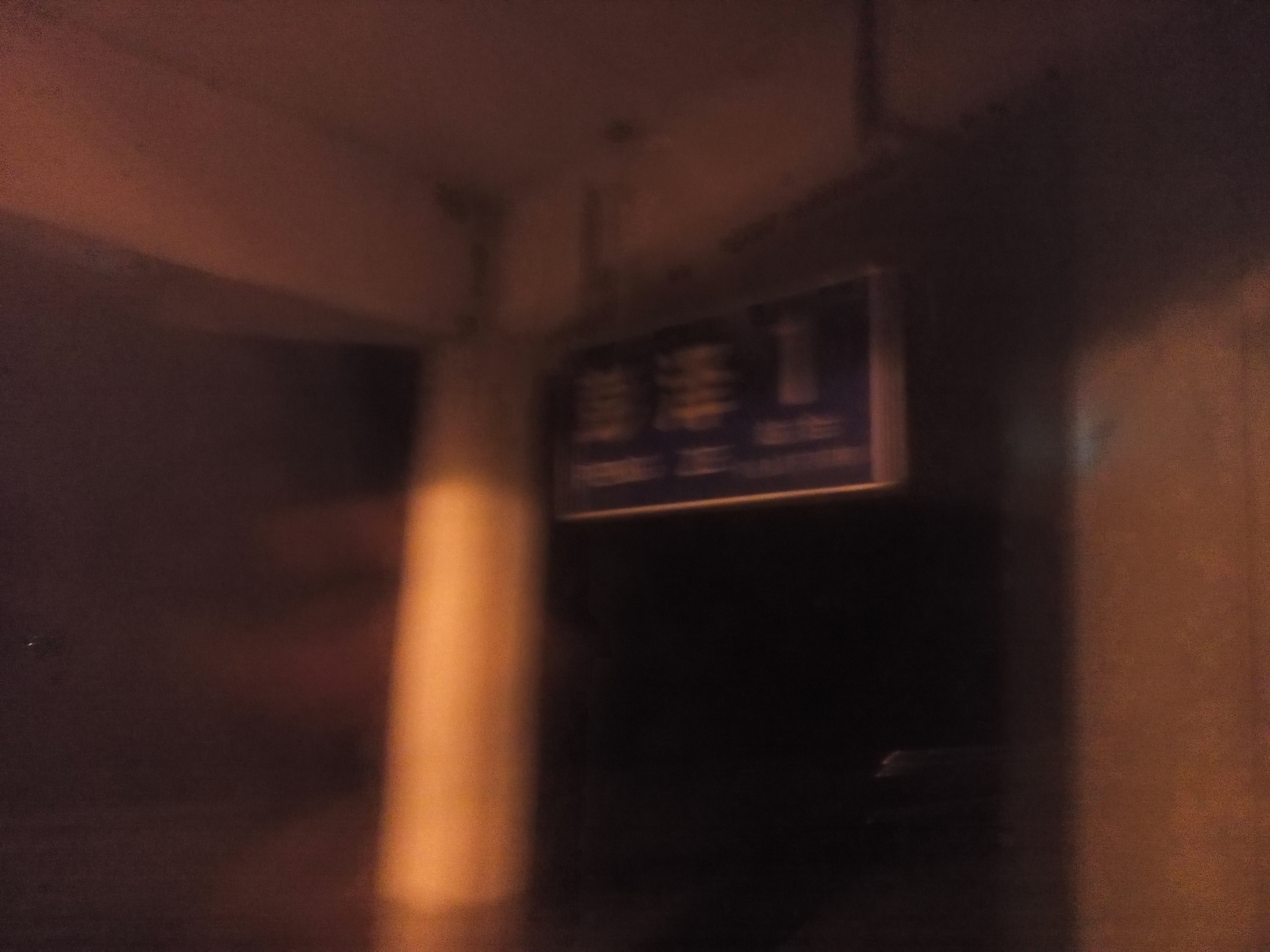
- Pengze railway station

General information
- Location: Pengze County, Jiujiang, Jiangxi; China
- Coordinates: 29.8688°N 116.5384°E
- Operated by: China Railway
- Line: Tongling–Jiujiang railway

History
- Opened: 1 September 2008
Location

Pengze railway station (Chinese: 彭泽站; pinyin: Péngzé Zhàn) is a railway station on the Tongling–Jiujiang railway in Pengze County, Jiujiang, Jiangxi, China. Opened on 1 September 2008, it is under the jurisdiction of China Railway Nanchang Group.

Preceding station	China Railway	Following station
Dongzhi towards Tongling	Tongling–Jiujiang railway	Hukou towards Jiujiang
