= 昭和 (disambiguation) =

Shōwa era (昭和) is the era of Hirohito from 1926 to 1989.

昭和 may also refer to:

- Prince Zhaohe of Jingjiang (靖江昭和王), Zhu Guiyu (朱規裕)'s posthumous name
- Wang Zhaohe (汪昭和), Qing dynasty people who donated property to renovate the Guangji Temple
