= Jiuziguangchang station =

Wuhu Rail Transit station

Jiuziguangchang 鸠兹广场
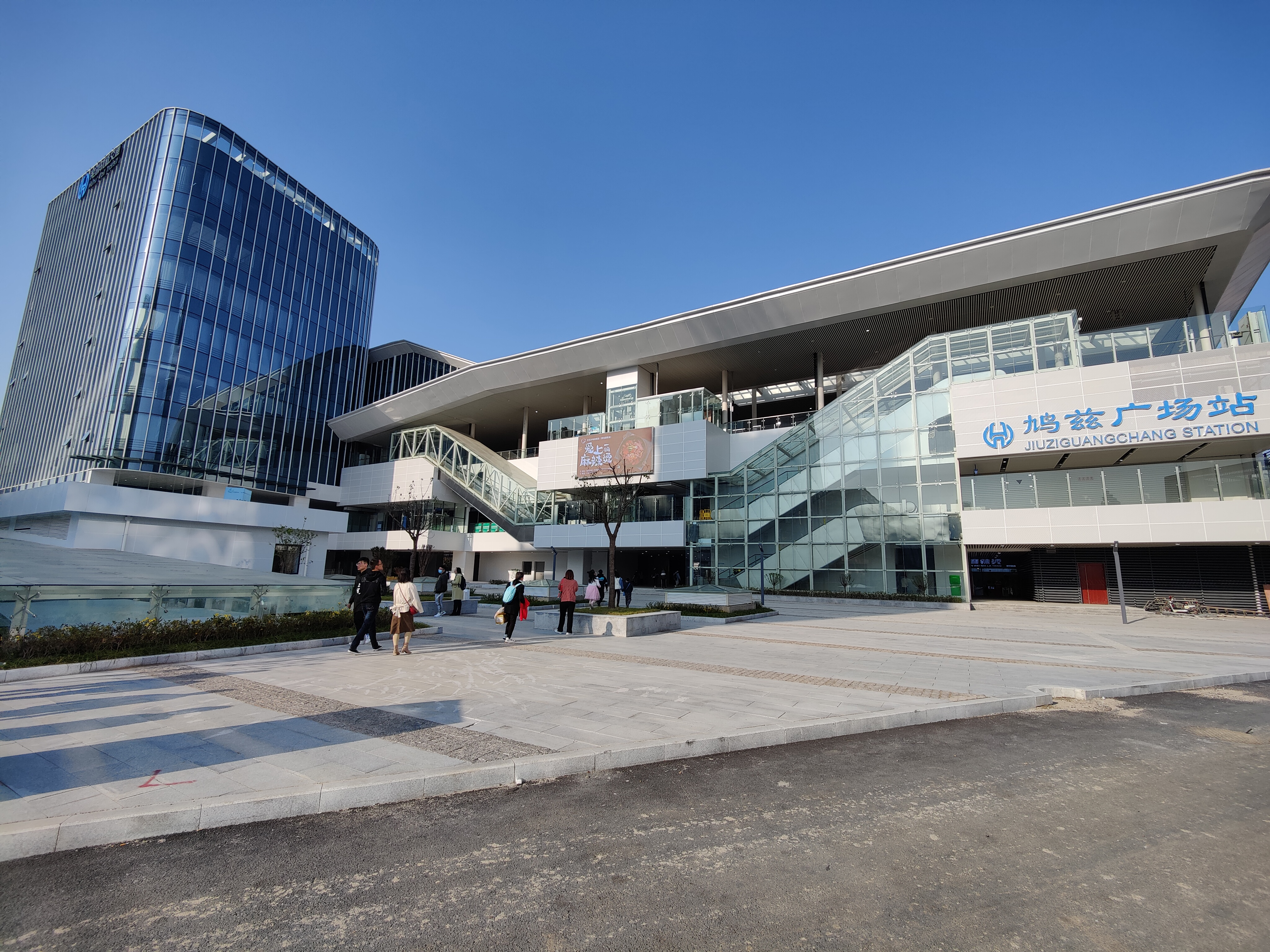

General information
- Location: Jinghu District, Wuhu, Anhui; China
- Coordinates: 31°20′3.67″N 118°22′0.53″E
- Operated by: Wuhu Rail Transit
- Line(s): Line 1; Line 2

History
- Opened: 3 November 2021
Location

Jiuziguangchang station (Chinese: 鸠兹广场站; lit. 'Jiuzi Square station') is a monorail interchange station in Jinghu District, Wuhu, Anhui, China. It is an interchange between Line 1 and Line 2 of Wuhu Rail Transit.

The station opened with line 1 on 3 November 2021. Line 2 opened on 28 December 2021, turning the station into an interchange.

Jiuziguangchang station is located in an affluent and heavily trafficked area of Wuhu city center, adjacent to Anhui Normal University Zheshan Campus, Zhongshan Road Pedestrian Street and other commercial facilities. The station is the only transfer station for Wuhu Rail Transit Line 1 and Line 2, so it has become the busiest station in Wuhu Rail Transit System.

Preceding station	Wuhu Rail Transit	Following station
Zhongshanbeilu towards Baoshunlu	Line 1	Huanchengbeilu towards Baimashan
Terminus	Line 2	Wenhualu towards Wanchunhulu
