= Chizhou railway station =

Railway station in Tongling, China

Chizhou 池州站
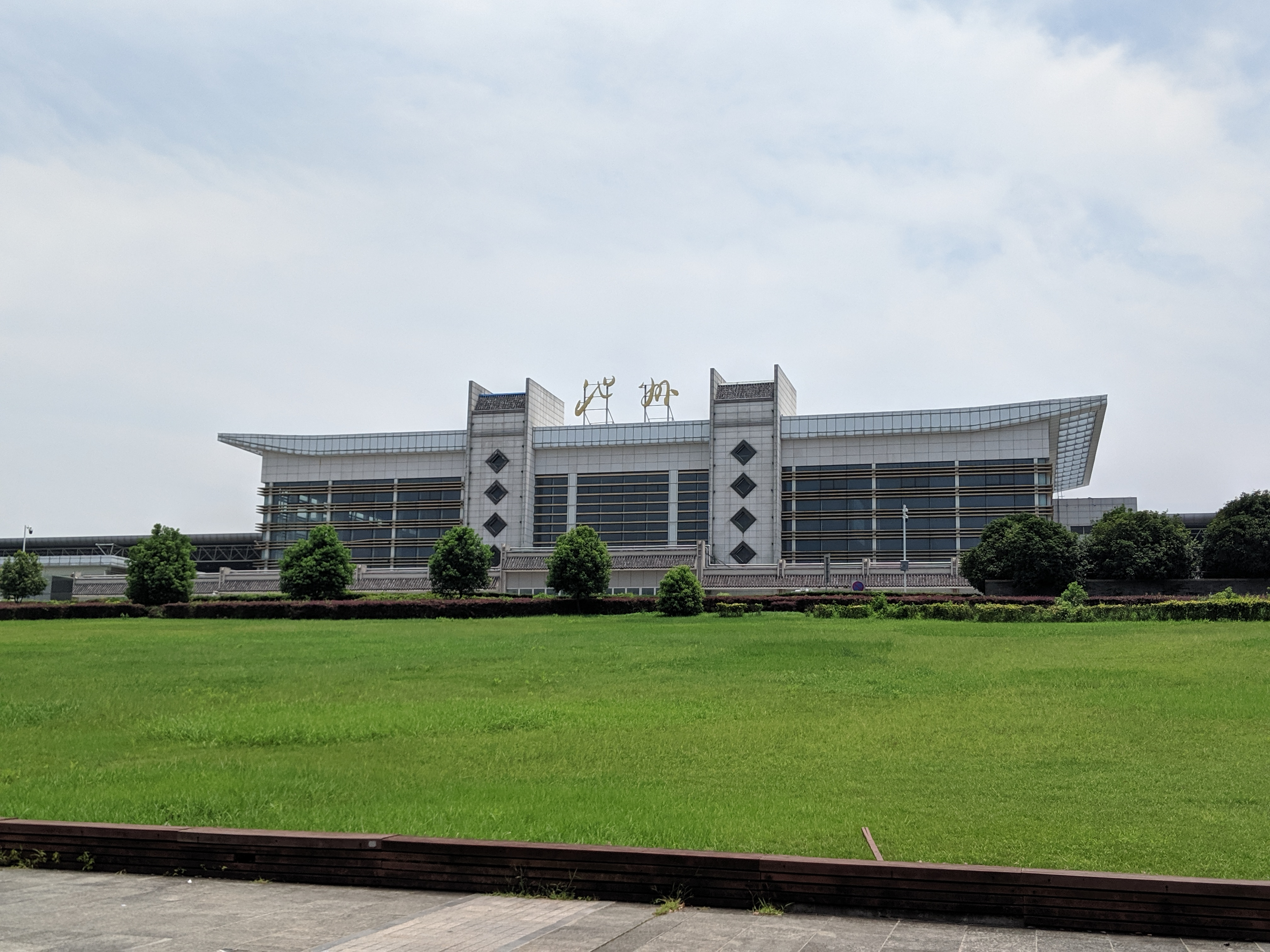

General information
- Location: Tongguan District, Tongling, Anhui; China
- Coordinates: 30.6215°N 117.5172°E
- Lines: Tongling–Jiujiang railway; Nanjing–Anqing intercity railway; Chizhou–Huangshan high-speed railway

History
- Opened: 1 September 2008
Location

Chizhou railway station is a railway station in Tongguan District, Tongling, Anhui, China.

== History ==
The station opened on 1 September 2008 with the introduction of passenger services on the Tongling–Jiujiang railway. On 6 December 2015, high-speed service began with the opening of the Nanjing–Anqing intercity railway. The Chizhou–Huangshan high-speed railway opened on 26 April 2024.

Preceding station	China Railway	Following station
Tongling Terminus	Tongling–Jiujiang railway	Dongzhi towards Jiujiang
Preceding station	China Railway High-speed	Following station
Tongling towards Nanjing South	Nanjing–Anqing intercity railway	Anqing Terminus
