= Ma'anshan East railway station =

Railway station in Huashan District, Ma'anshan, Anhui

Ma'anshan East 马鞍山东
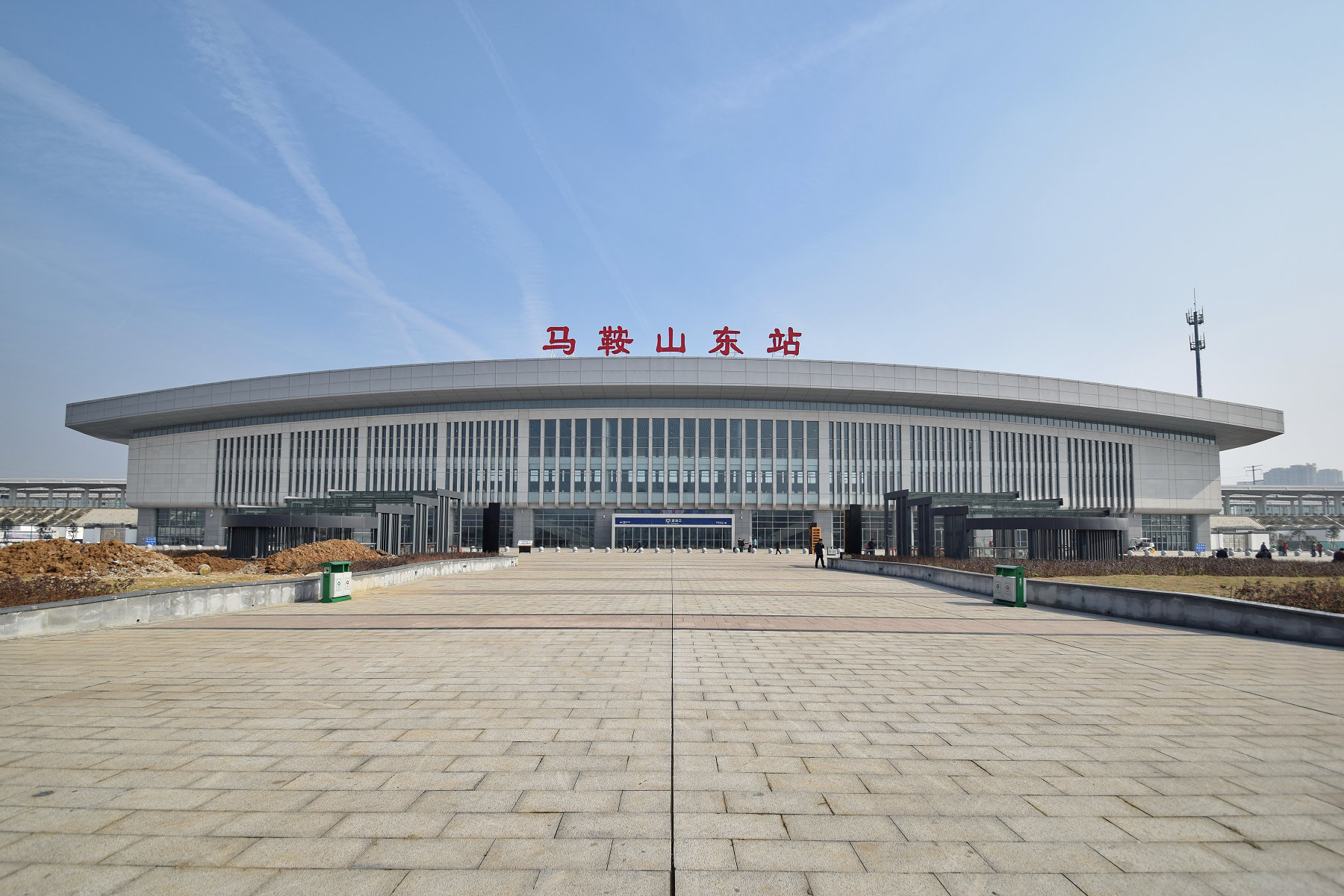

General information
- Location: Huashan District, Ma'anshan, Anhui; China
- Coordinates: 31°41′41.41″N 118°32′12.25″E
- Line(s): Nanjing–Anqing intercity railway; Chaohu–Ma'anshan intercity railway (under construction)

History
- Opened: 2015

Ma'anshan East railway station (Chinese: 马鞍山东站) is a railway station in Huashan District, Ma'anshan, Anhui, China. It is an intermediate station on the Nanjing–Anqing intercity railway. It opened in 2015.

Preceding station	China Railway High-speed	Following station
Jiangning West towards Nanjing South	Nanjing–Anqing intercity railway	Dangtu East towards Anqing
