= Guangji Temple (Wuhu) =

Buddhist temple in Anhui, China

- 广济寺
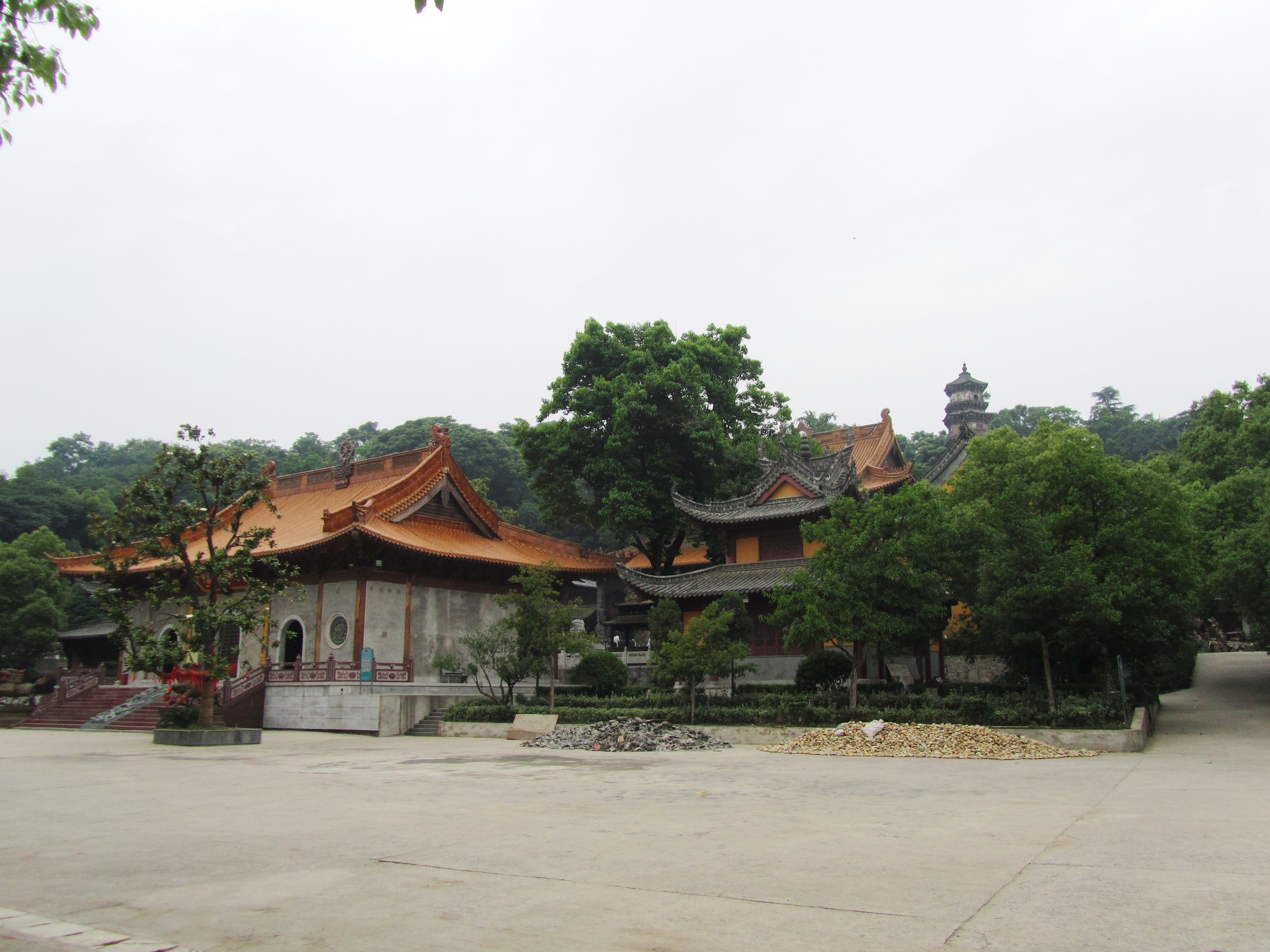
- A panoramic view of Guangji Temple.

- Location within China

Religion
- Affiliation: Buddhism
- Sect: Chan Buddhism
- Leadership: Shi Renyu (释仁煜)

Location
- Location: Jinghu District, Wuhu, Anhui
- Country: China
- Coordinates: 31°20′21″N 118°22′16″E

Architecture
- Style: Chinese architecture
- Established: 894–898

Guangji Temple (simplified Chinese: 广济寺; traditional Chinese: 廣濟寺; pinyin: Guǎngjì Sì) is a Buddhist temple located on the southwest hillside of Mount Zhe, in Jinghu District of Wuhu, Anhui, China. Alongside Puji Temple, Nengren Temple and Jixiang Temple, Guangji Temple is known as one of the "Four Buddhist Temples in Wuhu". Guangji Temple has been praised as "Little Mount Jiuhua". Guangji Temple experienced expansion and repair for many times and now still maintain the basic architectural pattern of the Ming and Qing dynasties (1368–1911).

== History ==
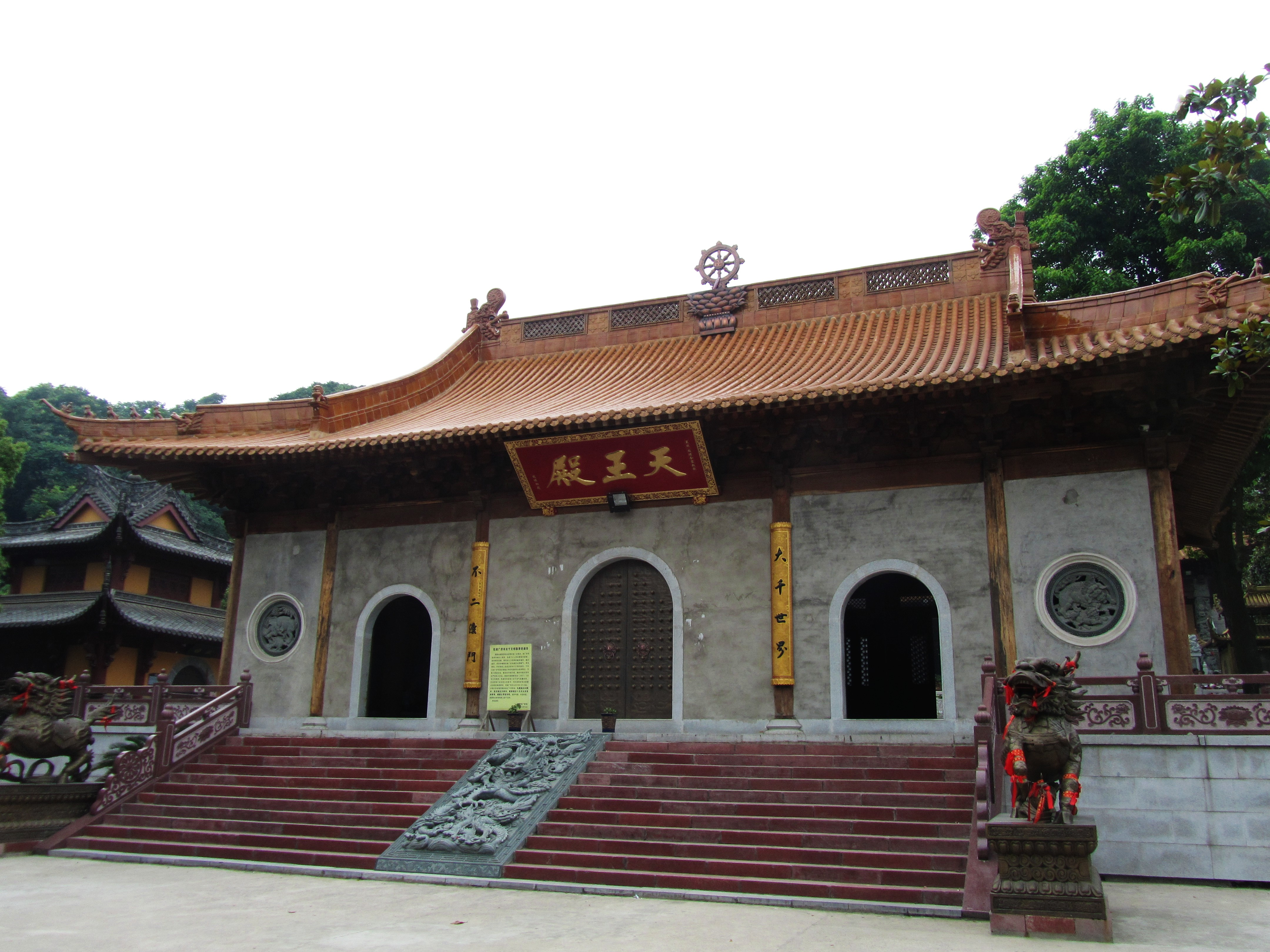
The Hall of Four Heavenly Kings at Guangji Temple.

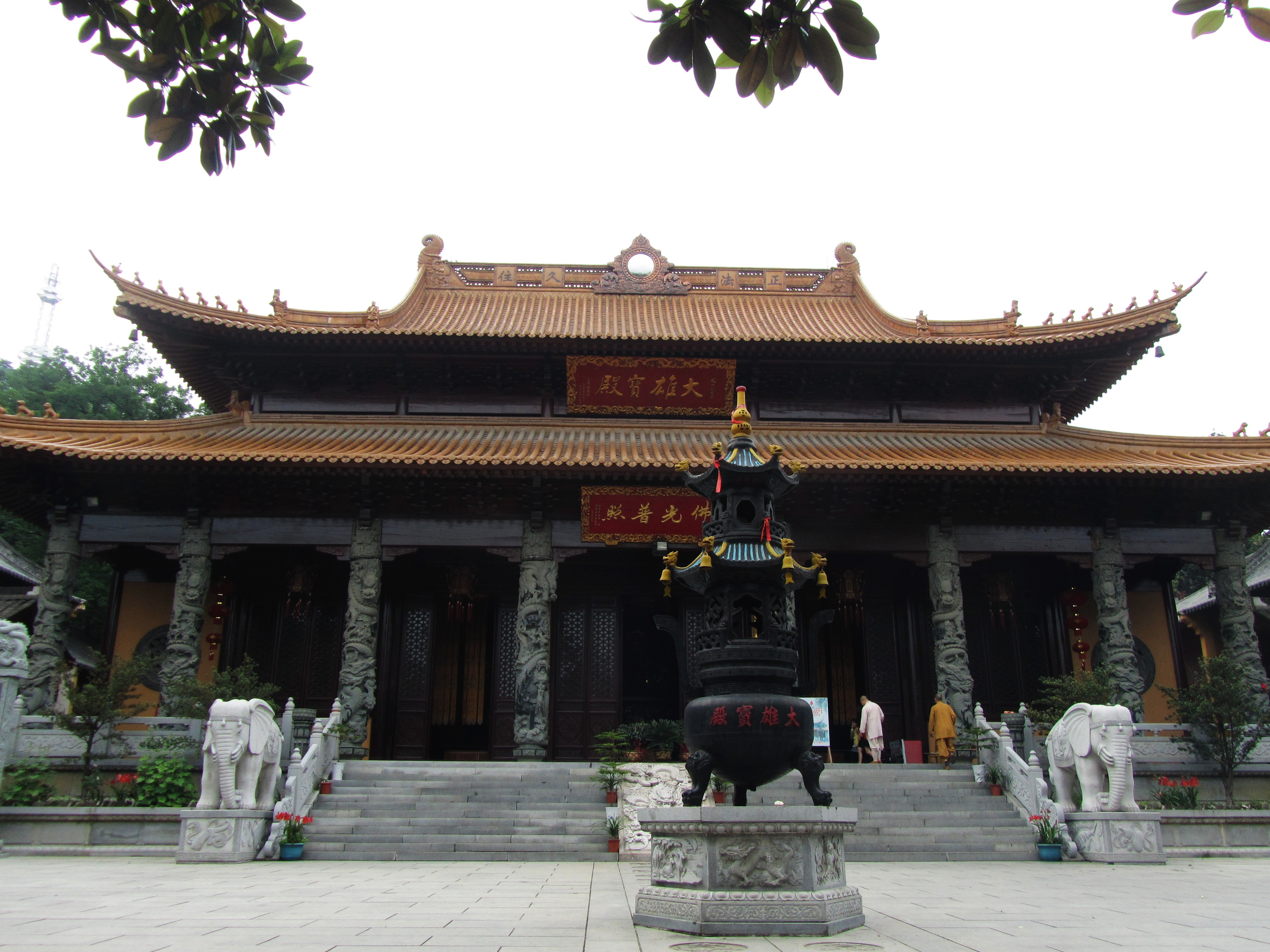
The Mahavira Hall at Guangji Temple.

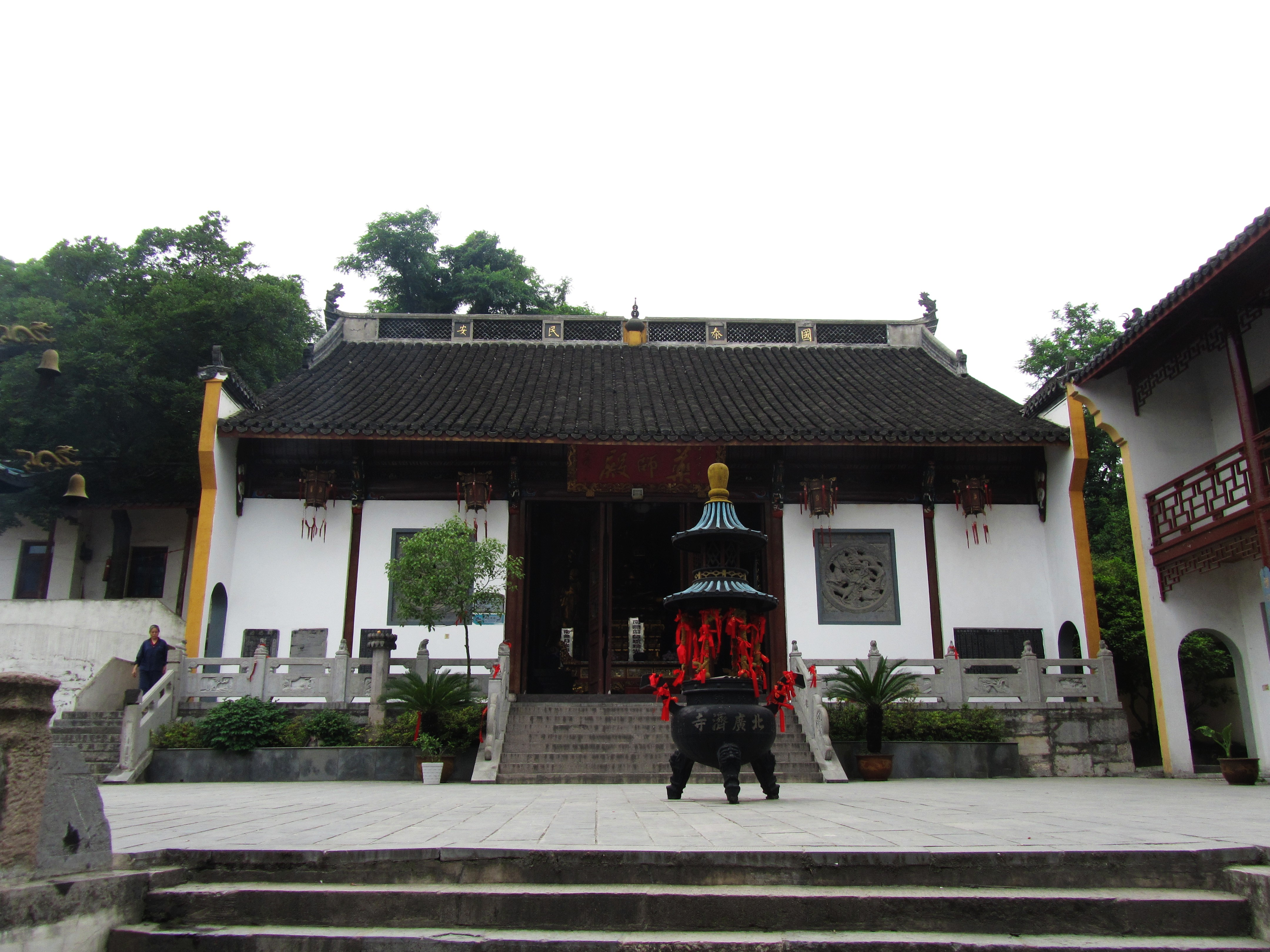
The Hall of Bhaisajyaguru at Guangji Temple.

=== Tang dynasty ===
Guangji Temple traces its origins to the a temple built in the Qianning period (894–897) of Tang dynasty (618-907). In the Guanghua period (898–901), it was renamed "Yongqing Temple" (永清寺).

=== Song dynasty ===
In the reign of Emperor Zhenzong (1048–1085) in the Song dynasty (960–1276), it was renamed "Guangji Temple" which it still in use now.

=== Yuan dynasty ===
In the Yuan dynasty (1368–1644), a poet named Ouyang Yuan (欧阳元) wrote a poem Mount Zhe (《赭山》) to eulogize the beautiful and picturesque landscape of Mount Zhe and Guangji Temple.

=== Ming dynasty ===
Guangji Temple was abolished in the Yongle period (1403–1424) of the Ming dynasty (1368–1644) and reactivated its religious activities in the Jingtai period (1450–1456).

=== Qing dynasty ===
In 1756, in the period of the Qianlong Emperor of the Qing dynasty (1644–1911), Dai Tianpu (戴天溥) and Wang Zhaohe (汪昭和) donated property to renovate the temple. In 1798, in the reign of Jiaqing Emperor, abbot Yuejiang (越江) repaired the temple. In the Xianfeng period (1850–1861), a fire consumed the temple. The modern temple was rebuilt in the Guangxu period (1874–1908).

=== People's Republic of China ===
In 1983 it has been designated as a "National Key Buddhist Temple in Han Chinese Area".

Guangji Temple has been categorized as an AAAA level tourist site by the China National Tourism Administration.

== Architecture ==
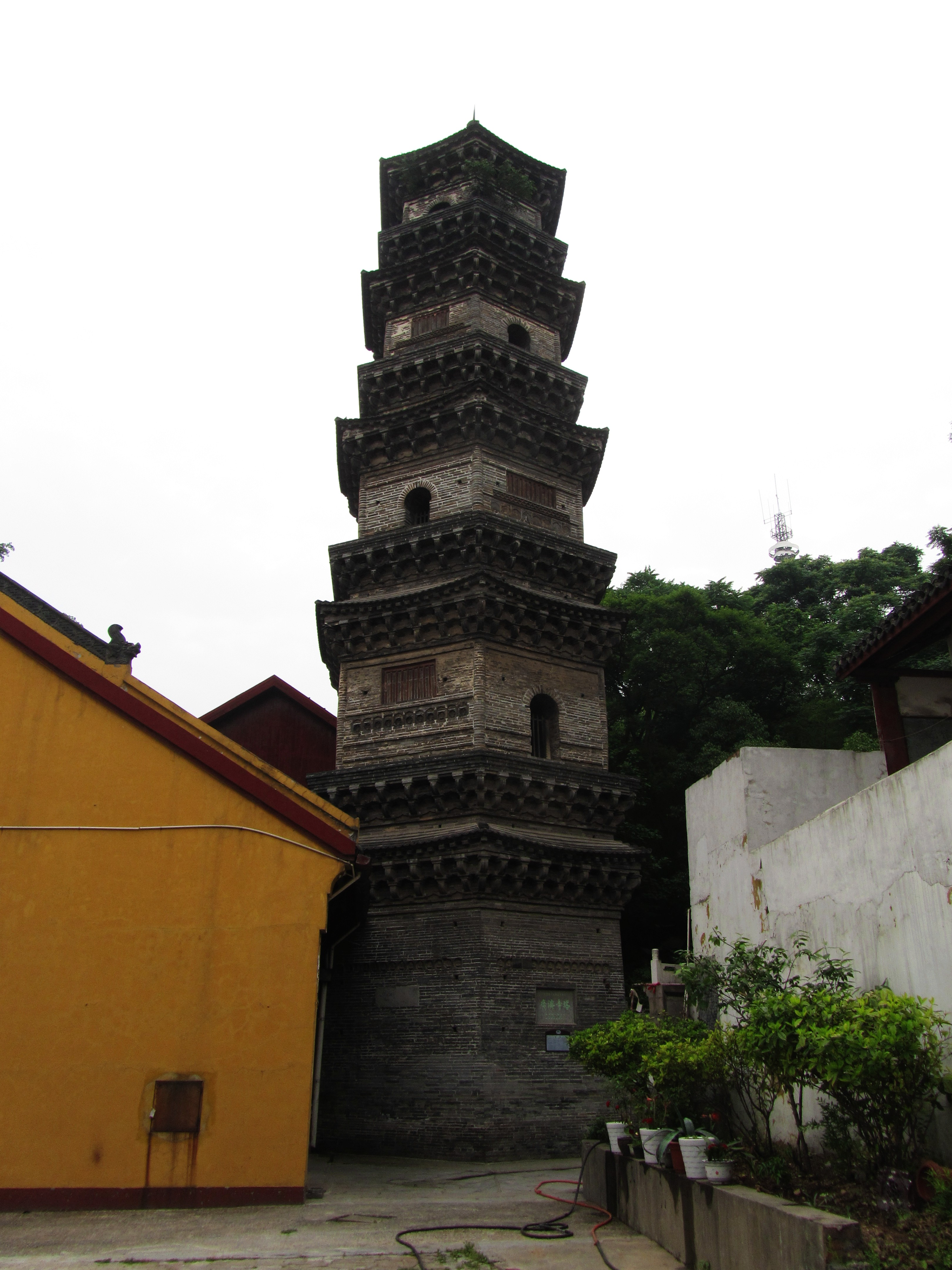
The Zhe Pagoda at Guangji Temple.

Guangji Temple is built along the up and down of Mount Zhe (赭山). Along the central axis are the Hall of Four Heavenly Kings, Hall of Bhaisajyaguru, Mahavira Hall, Hall of Ksitigarbha and the Pagoda.

=== Hall of Four Heavenly Kings ===
The Hall of Four Heavenly Kings is also the shanmen of the temple which is the first important hall in Guangji Temple. Maitreya is enshrined in the hall and at the back of his statue is a statue of Skanda. Heng and Ha, also known as Nryana, are enshrined in the left and right side of the hall.

=== Hall of Bhaisajyaguru ===
The Hall of Bhaisajyaguru is the hall to enshrine Bhaisajyaguru which is the second hall of Guangji Temple.

=== Mahavira Hall ===
The Mahavira Hall is the main hall of Guangji Temple. The Three-Life Buddha are enshrined in the temple. The statues of Eighteen Arhats stand on both sides of the hall.

=== Hall of Ksitigarbha ===
The Hall of Ksitigarbha is the most important annex halls in Guangji Temple. A 12-metre (39 ft) high statue of Ksitigarbha is placed in the hall, which is magnificent and become the symbol of Guangji Temple. Two standing statues of Min Wen (闵文) and Daoming (道明) are placed on both sides of Ksitigarbha.
