= Chaohu–Ma'anshan intercity railway =

High-speed rail line in China

Overview
- Native name: 巢马城际铁路
- Status: Under construction

Service
- Operator(s): China Railway Shanghai Group

Technical
- Line length: 73 km (45 mi)
- Track gauge: 1,435 mm (4 ft 8 1/2 in)
- Operating speed: 350 km/h (217 mph)

The Chaohu–Ma'anshan intercity railway is a high-speed railway in Anhui Province, China. It will be 73 kilometres (45 mi) long and have a maximum speed of 350 kilometres per hour (220 mph). The line is expected to be completed in 2026.

== Stations ==
Station Name	Chinese
Chaohu East	巢湖东
Hanshan	含山
Zhengpugang	郑蒲港
Ma'anshan South	马鞍山南
Ma'anshan East	马鞍山东
