= Anqing Yangtze River Railway Bridge =

Anqing Railway Bridge 安庆长江铁路大桥
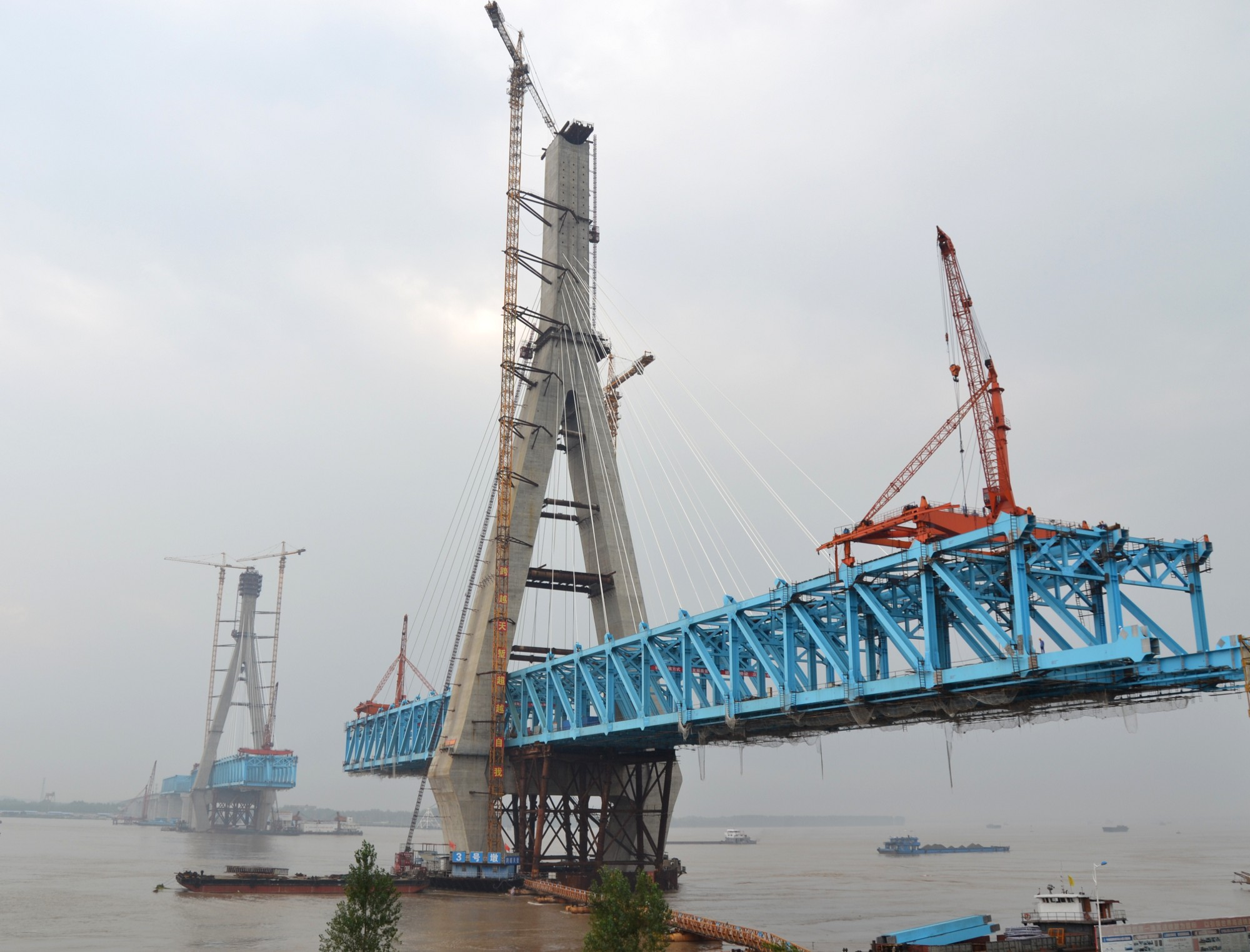
- Coordinates: 30°34′20″N 117°14′55″E
- Carries: Nanjing–Anqing Intercity Railway
- Crosses: Yangtze River
- Locale: Anqing, Anhui, China

Characteristics
- Design: Cable-stayed
- Total length: 2,996.8 m (9,832 ft)
- Width: 28 m (92 ft)
- Height: 210 m (689 ft)
- Longest span: 580 m (1,903 ft)

History
- Construction start: March 20, 2009
- Construction cost: 1.43 billion yuan
- Opened: 2015

Location
- Interactive map of Anqing Railway Bridge

The Anqing Yangtze River Railway Bridge is a cable-stayed bridge spanning the Yangtze River near Anqing, Anhui, China. Construction of the bridge began on March 20, 2009, and was completed in December 2015, with a total cost of 1.43 billion yuan. The bridge has a main span of 580 metres (1,900 ft) and a total length of 2,997 metres (9,833 ft), making it the longest cable-stayed railway bridge in the world. The bridge carries four railway tracks; two serve the high-speed Nanjing–Anqing Intercity Railway line, and the other two serve the Lu'an-Anqing line when it is completed. The completion of the bridge significantly reduced the rail travel time between Nanjing and Anqing from eight hours to just 90 minutes.

== See also ==
- Bridges and tunnels across the Yangtze River
- List of bridges in China
- List of longest cable-stayed bridge spans
- List of tallest bridges
