= Fanchang, Wuhu =

Coordinates: 31°04′59″N 118°12′00″E

Fanchang 繁昌区
- District
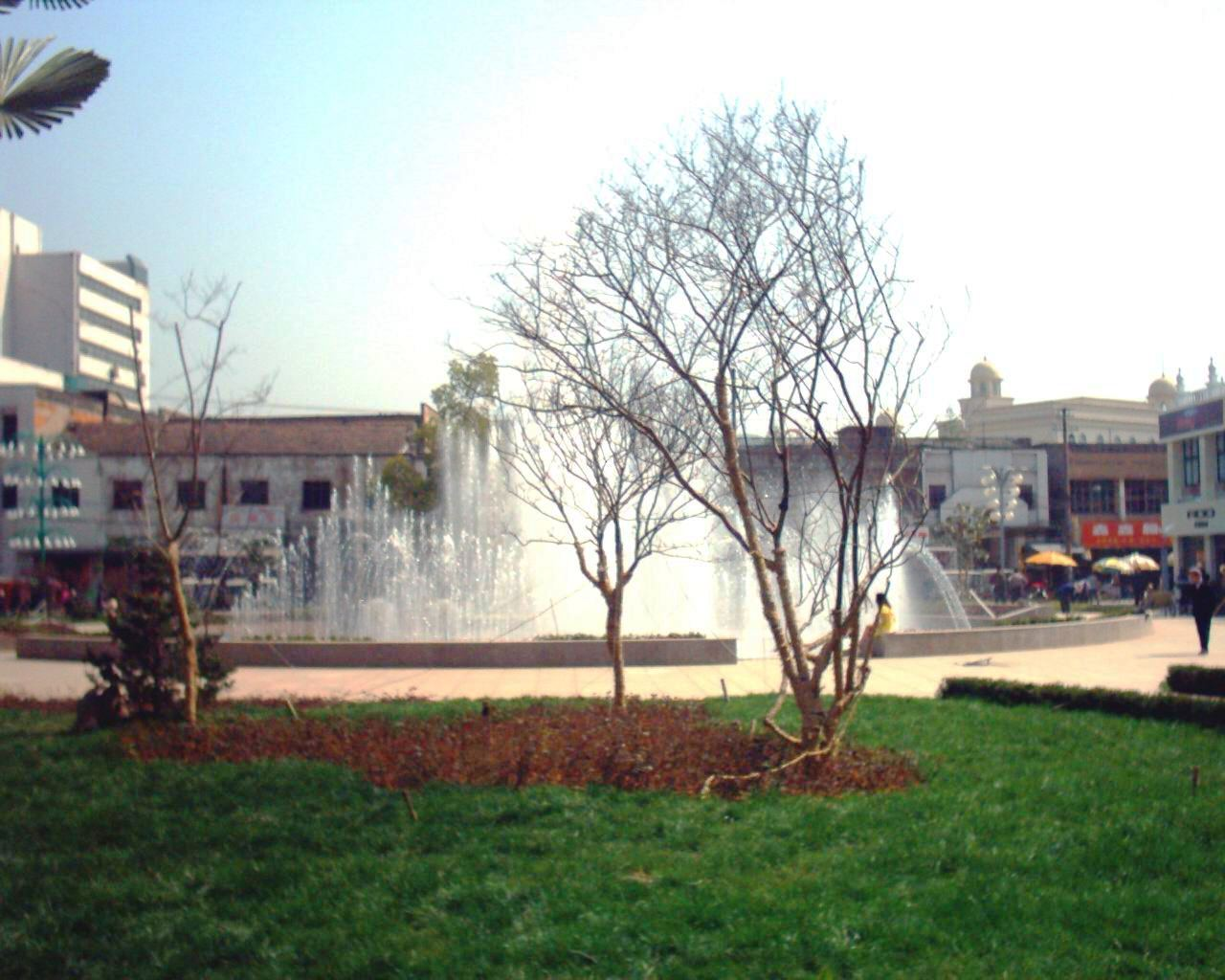
- Interactive map of Fanchang
- Country: China
- Province: Anhui
- Prefecture-level city: Wuhu
- District seat: Fanyang

Area
  - Total: 630 km^{2} (240 sq mi)

Population (2018)
  - Total: 271,000
- Time zone: UTC+8 (China Standard)
- Postal code: 241200
- Website: http://www.fanchang.gov.cn/

Fanchang (Chinese: 繁昌区; pinyin: Fánchāng Qū) is a district in Wuhu, Anhui Province, China.

== Notable places ==
The Fanchang Stadium is located in Fanchang District. It has a capacity of 12,000 and it is used mostly for association football.

== Transport ==
- Fanchang West railway station on the Nanjing-Anqing intercity railway

== Administrative divisions ==
Fanchang District is divided to 6 towns:

- Fanyang (繁阳镇)
- Eshan (峨山镇)
- Pingpu (平铺镇)
- Xingang (新港镇)
- Suncun (孙村镇)
- Huogang (荻港镇)

== Climate ==
Climate data for Fanchang District, elevation 61 m (200 ft), (1991–2020 normals, extremes 1981–present)
Month	Jan	Feb	Mar	Apr	May	Jun	Jul	Aug	Sep	Oct	Nov	Dec	Year
Record high °C (°F)	22.0 (71.6)	29.0 (84.2)	36.1 (97.0)	34.3 (93.7)	36.5 (97.7)	38.1 (100.6)	40.6 (105.1)	41.2 (106.2)	38.2 (100.8)	33.6 (92.5)	29.5 (85.1)	23.0 (73.4)	41.2 (106.2)
Mean daily maximum °C (°F)	7.8 (46.0)	10.7 (51.3)	15.7 (60.3)	22.2 (72.0)	27.1 (80.8)	29.6 (85.3)	33.2 (91.8)	32.5 (90.5)	28.3 (82.9)	23.1 (73.6)	17.0 (62.6)	10.5 (50.9)	21.5 (70.7)
Daily mean °C (°F)	3.3 (37.9)	5.9 (42.6)	10.4 (50.7)	16.5 (61.7)	21.7 (71.1)	25.1 (77.2)	28.4 (83.1)	27.9 (82.2)	23.5 (74.3)	17.7 (63.9)	11.3 (52.3)	5.4 (41.7)	16.4 (61.6)
Mean daily minimum °C (°F)	0.2 (32.4)	2.3 (36.1)	6.4 (43.5)	11.8 (53.2)	17.2 (63.0)	21.5 (70.7)	24.7 (76.5)	24.4 (75.9)	19.9 (67.8)	13.7 (56.7)	7.4 (45.3)	1.8 (35.2)	12.6 (54.7)
Record low °C (°F)	−9.1 (15.6)	−12.6 (9.3)	−4.2 (24.4)	0.1 (32.2)	6.5 (43.7)	13.0 (55.4)	17.8 (64.0)	17.3 (63.1)	9.5 (49.1)	1.0 (33.8)	−5.2 (22.6)	−12.1 (10.2)	−12.6 (9.3)
Average precipitation mm (inches)	73.8 (2.91)	79.6 (3.13)	117.2 (4.61)	117.1 (4.61)	132.7 (5.22)	240.1 (9.45)	192.5 (7.58)	153.7 (6.05)	96.4 (3.80)	62.7 (2.47)	67.2 (2.65)	46.9 (1.85)	1,379.9 (54.33)
Average precipitation days (≥ 0.1 mm)	11.4	11.1	13.8	12.1	12.2	13.5	12.7	13.1	9.0	8.8	9.5	8.2	135.4
Average snowy days	4.2	2.1	0.7	0	0	0	0	0	0	0	0.3	1.1	8.4
Average relative humidity (%)	78	77	75	74	74	80	80	81	80	78	79	77	78
Mean monthly sunshine hours	106.7	112.1	131.9	162.0	177.3	151.5	203.3	191.4	154.4	154.1	135.9	126.8	1,807.4
Percentage possible sunshine	33	36	35	42	42	36	47	47	42	44	43	40	41
Source: China Meteorological Administration
