= Line 1 (Wuhu Rail Transit) =

Metro line in Wuhu, China

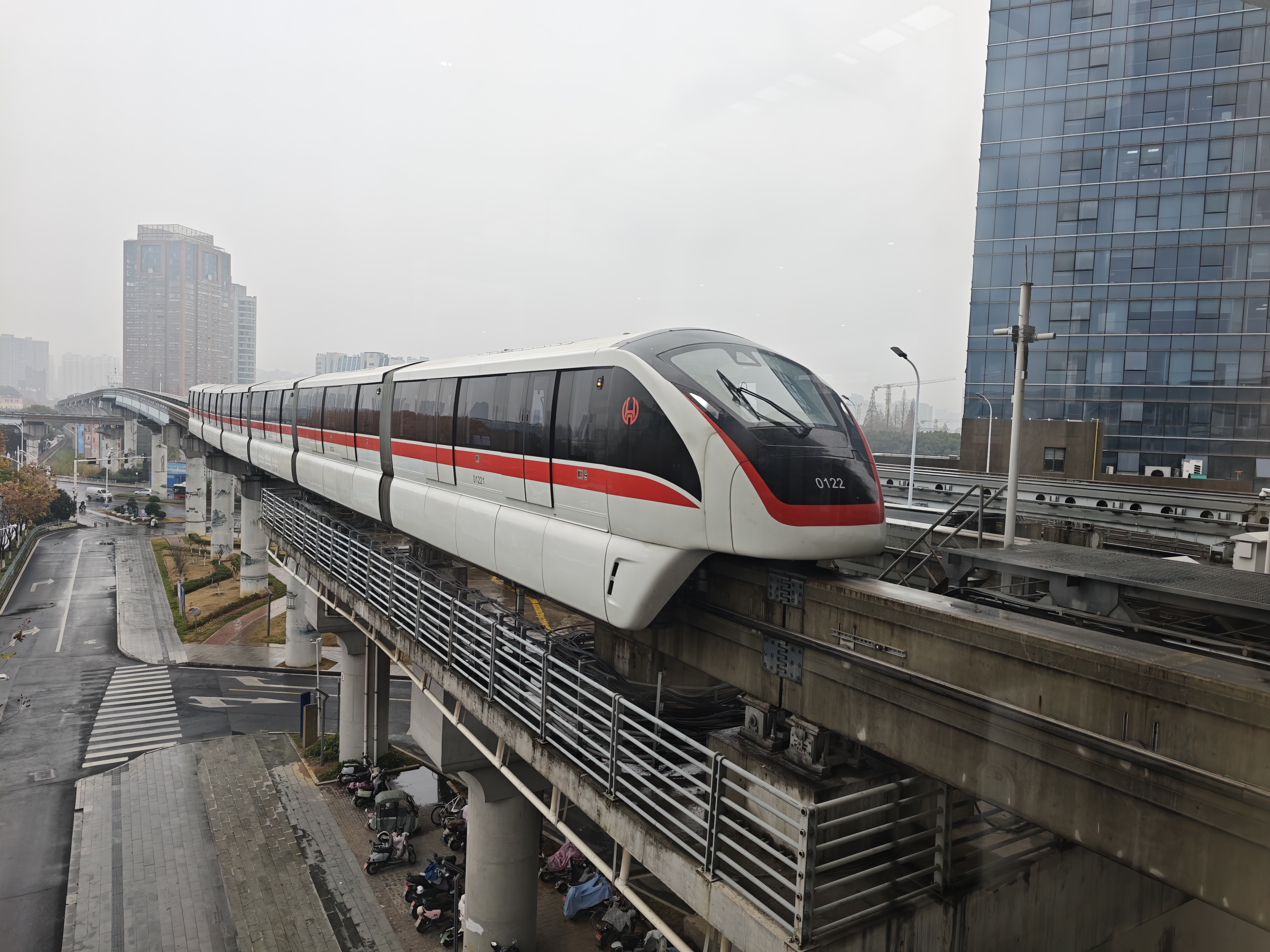

Overview
- Status: Operational
- Locale: Wuhu, Anhui, China
- Termini: Baoshunlu; Baimashan
- Stations: 25

Service
- Type: Straddle-beam monorail rapid transit
- System: Wuhu Rail Transit
- Services: 1
- Depots: Baoshun Parking Lot; Baimashan Depot
- Rolling stock: Bombardier INNOVIA Monorail 300
- Daily ridership: 96,400 passengers (peak) (1 January 2022)

History
- Opened: 3 November 2021; 4 years ago

Technical
- Line length: 30.46 km (18.93 mi)
- Number of tracks: 2
- Character: Elevated
- Operating speed: 80 km/h (50 mph)

Line 1 of Wuhu Rail Transit (Chinese: 芜湖轨道交通1号线; pinyin: Wúhú guǐdào jiāotōng yīhàoxiàn) consists of 25 stations (all elevated stations) and 30.46 kilometres (18.93 mi) of track between Baoshunlu station in the north and Baimashan station in the south. It opened on 3 November 2021.

== Stations ==
Station name		Connections	Distance km	Location
English	Chinese	Connections	Distance km	Location
Baoshunlu	保顺路			Jiujiang
Huashanlu	华山路			Jiujiang
Taishanlu	泰山路			Jiujiang
Hengshanlu	衡山路			Jiujiang
Longshanlu	龙山路			Jiujiang
Anshanlu	鞍山路			Jiujiang
Gangwanlu	港湾路			Jiujiang
Yu'anlu	裕安路			Jiujiang
Wuyishanlu	武夷山路			Jiujiang
Gangyilu	港一路			Jiujiang
Tianzhushanlu	天柱山路			Jinghu
Tianmenshanlu	天门山路			Jinghu
Chizhushanlu	赤铸山路			Jinghu
Zheshanlu	赭山路			Jinghu
Zheshangongyuan	赭山公园			Jinghu
Zhongshanbeilu	中山北路			Jinghu
Jiuziguangchang	鸠兹广场	2		Jinghu
Huanchengbeilu	环城北路			Jinghu
Aotizhongxin	奥体中心			Yijiang
Honghuashanlu	红花山路			Yijiang
Bolanzhongxin	博览中心			Yijiang
Wenjindonglu	文津东路			Yijiang
Henglangshanlu	珩琅山路			Yijiang
Wuhunan Railway Station	芜湖南站	RVH		Yijiang
Baimashan	白马山			Yijiang
