= Pengze County =

Pengze County 彭泽县
- County
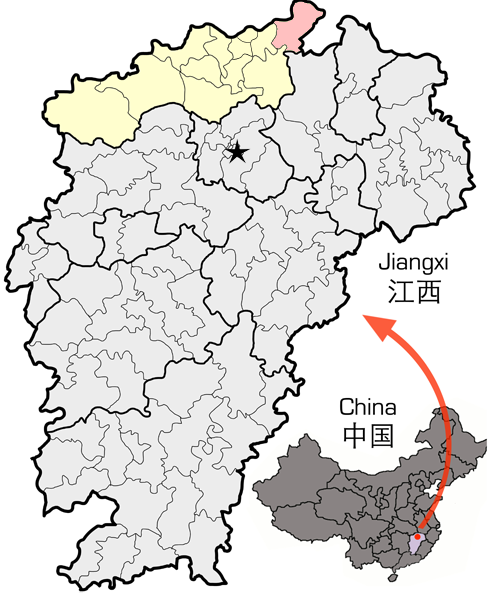
- Location of Pengze County (red) within Jiujiang City (yellow) and Jiangxi
- Coordinates (Longcheng government): 29°53′46″N 116°32′56″E
- Country: People's Republic of China
- Province: Jiangxi
- Prefecture-level city: Jiujiang

Area
  - Total: 1,544 km^{2} (596 sq mi)

Population (2019)
  - Total: 364,800
  - Density: 236.3/km^{2} (611.9/sq mi)
- Time zone: UTC+8 (China Standard)
- Postal code: 332700

Pengze County (simplified Chinese: 彭泽县; traditional Chinese: 彭澤縣; pinyin: Péngzé Xiàn) is a county in the north of Jiangxi Province, situated on the southeast (right) bank of the Yangtze. The northernmost county-level division of the province, it is under the administration of the prefecture-level city of Jiujiang.

Pengze county has a long history of written record. This county firstly established in the sixth year of Emperor Gaozu, Western Han dynasty (201 BCE)

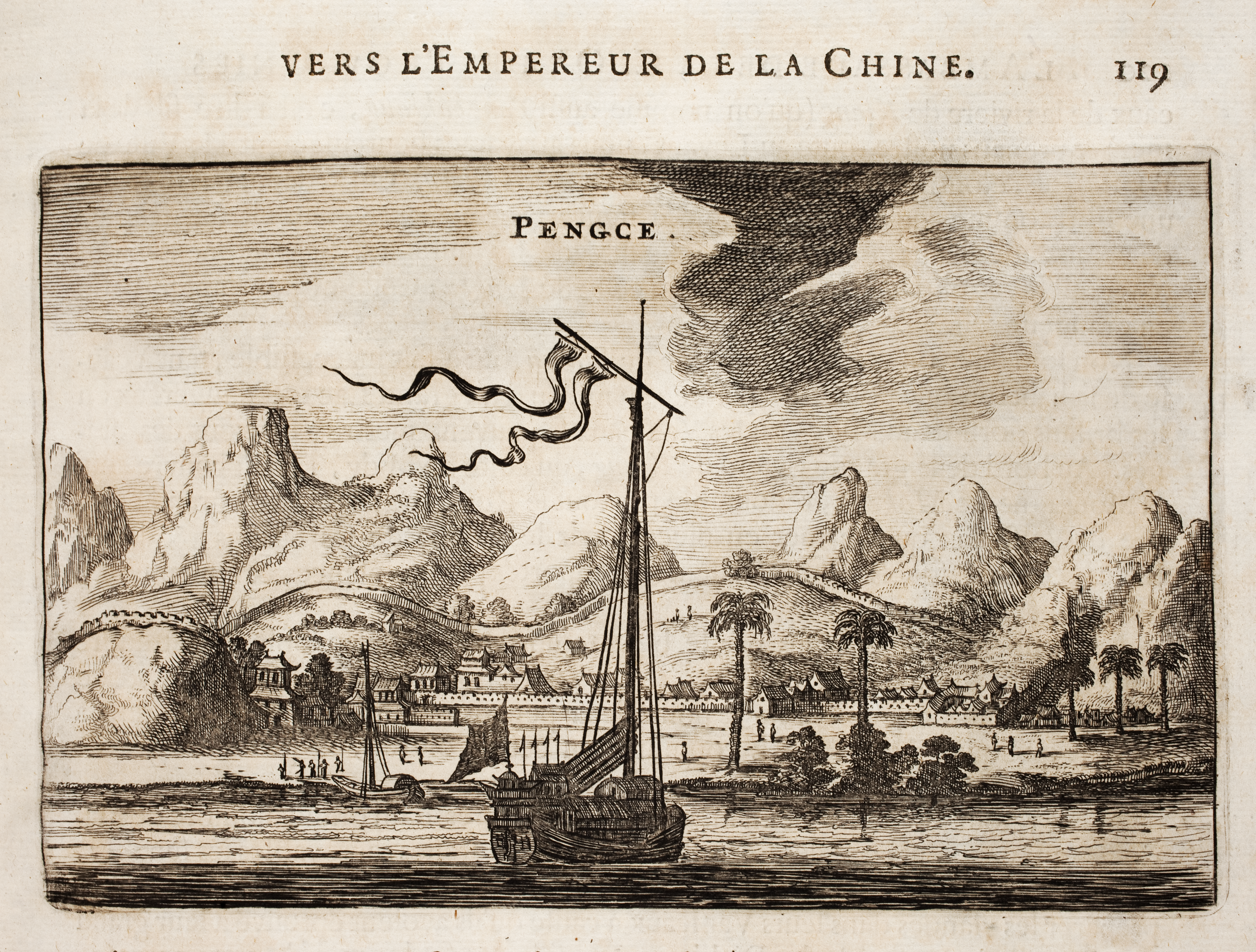
Pengze. Nieuhof: L'ambassade de la Compagnie Orientale des Provinces Unies vers l'Empereur de la Chine, 1665

== Administrative divisions ==
Pengze County has ten towns and three townships.

=== Towns ===
The ten towns of Pengze County are:

- Longcheng (龙城镇)
- Mianchuan (棉船镇)
- Madang (马垱镇)
- Furongdun (芙蓉墩镇)
- Dingshan (定山镇)
- Tianhong (天红镇)
- Yangzi (杨椊镇)
- Dongsheng (东升镇)
- Langxi (浪溪镇)
- Huanghua (黄花镇)

=== Townships ===
The three townships of Pengze County are:

- Taipingguan (太平关乡)
- Huangling (黄岭乡)
- Haoshan (浩山乡)

== Transport ==
Pengze is served by Pengze railway station on the Tongling–Jiujiang railway.

== Climate ==
Climate data for Pengze, elevation 99 m (325 ft), (1991–2020 normals, extremes 1969–2010)
Month	Jan	Feb	Mar	Apr	May	Jun	Jul	Aug	Sep	Oct	Nov	Dec	Year
Record high °C (°F)	21.6 (70.9)	27.4 (81.3)	32.6 (90.7)	33.0 (91.4)	35.1 (95.2)	37.5 (99.5)	39.7 (103.5)	40.0 (104.0)	36.8 (98.2)	33.6 (92.5)	30.3 (86.5)	22.8 (73.0)	40.0 (104.0)
Mean daily maximum °C (°F)	7.9 (46.2)	10.8 (51.4)	15.8 (60.4)	22.1 (71.8)	26.9 (80.4)	29.4 (84.9)	32.9 (91.2)	32.4 (90.3)	28.4 (83.1)	23.3 (73.9)	16.9 (62.4)	10.5 (50.9)	21.4 (70.6)
Daily mean °C (°F)	4.6 (40.3)	7.1 (44.8)	11.5 (52.7)	17.4 (63.3)	22.3 (72.1)	25.4 (77.7)	28.7 (83.7)	28.2 (82.8)	24.2 (75.6)	18.9 (66.0)	12.8 (55.0)	6.8 (44.2)	17.3 (63.2)
Mean daily minimum °C (°F)	2.2 (36.0)	4.3 (39.7)	8.4 (47.1)	13.9 (57.0)	18.8 (65.8)	22.5 (72.5)	25.7 (78.3)	25.2 (77.4)	21.3 (70.3)	15.8 (60.4)	9.8 (49.6)	4.0 (39.2)	14.3 (57.8)
Record low °C (°F)	−6.4 (20.5)	−18.9 (−2.0)	−2.7 (27.1)	3.2 (37.8)	9.2 (48.6)	14.9 (58.8)	19.1 (66.4)	17.9 (64.2)	13.8 (56.8)	4.5 (40.1)	−1.2 (29.8)	−6.5 (20.3)	−18.9 (−2.0)
Average precipitation mm (inches)	79.8 (3.14)	95.1 (3.74)	135.7 (5.34)	165.2 (6.50)	199.6 (7.86)	248.5 (9.78)	219.8 (8.65)	145.1 (5.71)	64.0 (2.52)	61.8 (2.43)	72.0 (2.83)	53.6 (2.11)	1,540.2 (60.61)
Average precipitation days (≥ 0.1 mm)	12.2	13.1	14.8	14.2	13.3	14.7	11.1	11.5	7.2	8.2	10.1	9.2	139.6
Average snowy days	3.6	2.3	0.4	0	0	0	0	0	0	0	0.2	1.4	7.9
Average relative humidity (%)	76	76	75	73	75	81	78	79	78	75	76	72	76
Mean monthly sunshine hours	82.6	85.6	112.8	140.9	161.5	141.0	209.6	200.4	166.9	144.4	113.2	108.5	1,667.4
Percentage possible sunshine	25	27	30	36	38	34	49	49	46	41	36	34	37
Source: China Meteorological Administration all-time extreme low
