= Line 2 (Wuhu Rail Transit) =

Metro line in Wuhu, China

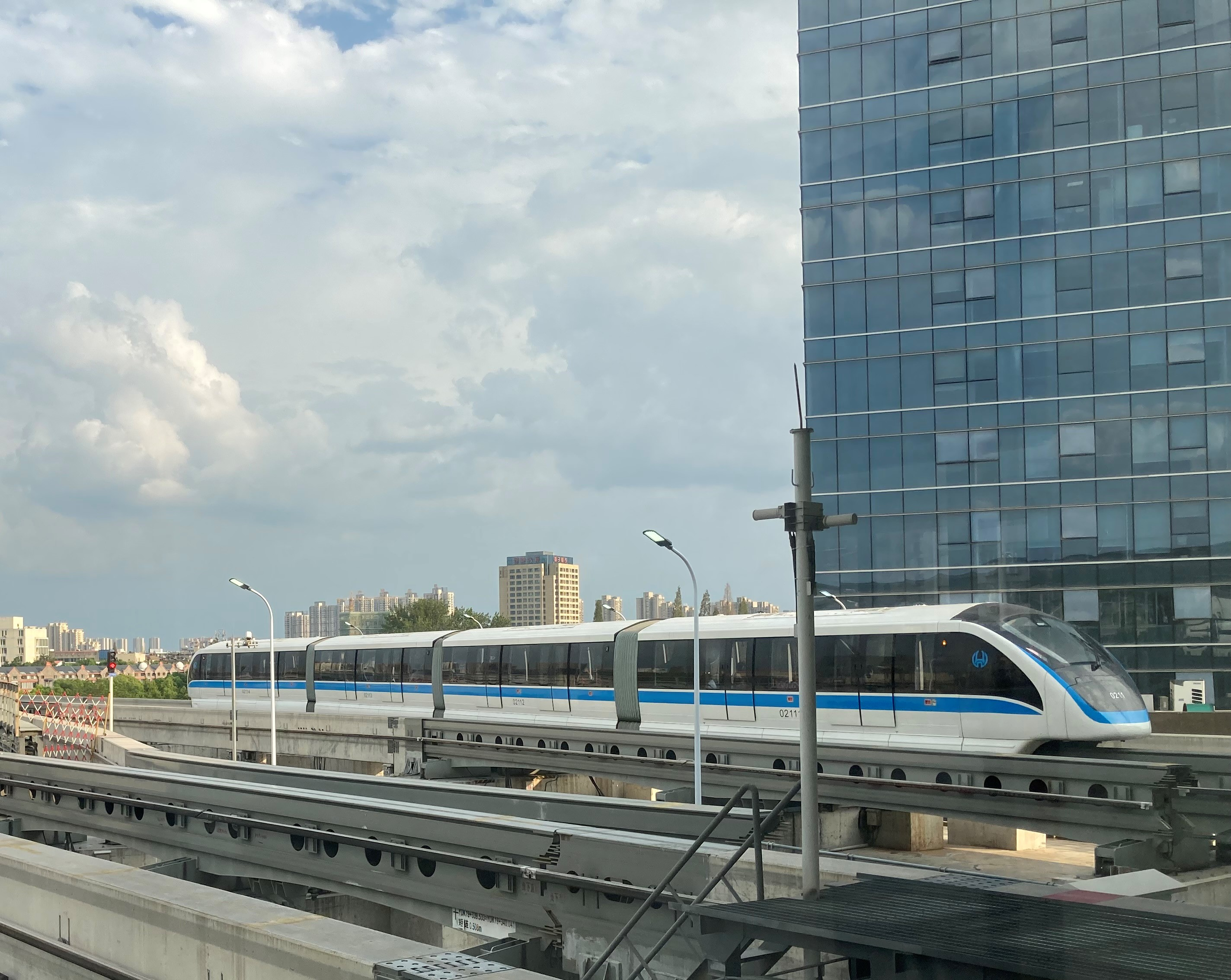

Overview
- Status: Operational
- Locale: Wuhu, Anhui, China
- Termini: Wanchunhulu; Jiuziguangchang
- Stations: 11

Service
- Type: Straddle-beam monorail rapid transit
- System: Wuhu Rail Transit
- Services: 1
- Depot(s): Mengxi Road Depot; Jiangbei Parking Lot
- Rolling stock: Bombardier INNOVIA Monorail 300
- Daily ridership: 73,700 passengers (peak) (1 January 2022)

History
- Opened: 28 December 2021; 4 years ago

Technical
- Line length: 15.787 km (9.810 mi)
- Number of tracks: 2
- Character: Elevated

Line 2 of Wuhu Rail Transit (Chinese: 芜湖轨道交通2号线; pinyin: Wúhú guǐdào jiāotōng èrhàoxiàn) is a rapid transit line in Wuhu. Phase 1 runs between Wanchunhulu station to Jiuziguangchang station, with transfer to Line 1 at Jiuziguangchang station. It consists of 11 stations and 15.787 kilometres (9.810 mi) of track. It opened on 28 December 2021.

== Stations ==
Station name		Connections	Distance km	Location
English	Chinese	Connections	Distance km	Location
Wanchunhulu	万春湖路			Jiujiang
Mengxilu	梦溪路			Jiujiang
Huizhoulu	徽州路			Jiujiang
Haiyanlu	海晏路			Jiujiang
Zhengwuzhongxin	政务中心			Jiujiang
Yunconglu	云从路			Jiujiang
Shenshangongyuan	神山公园			Jiujiang
Wuhu Railway Station	芜湖火车站	WHH		Jinghu
Shenshankou	神山口			Jinghu
Wenhualu	文化路			Jinghu
Jiuziguangchang	鸠兹广场	1		Jinghu

== Phase 2 ==
The second phase of Line 2 is under planning and will be completed by 2025. It will extend Line 2 to Jiangbei railway station.
