= Wuhu Rail Transit =

Rapid transit system in Wuhu, Anhui, China

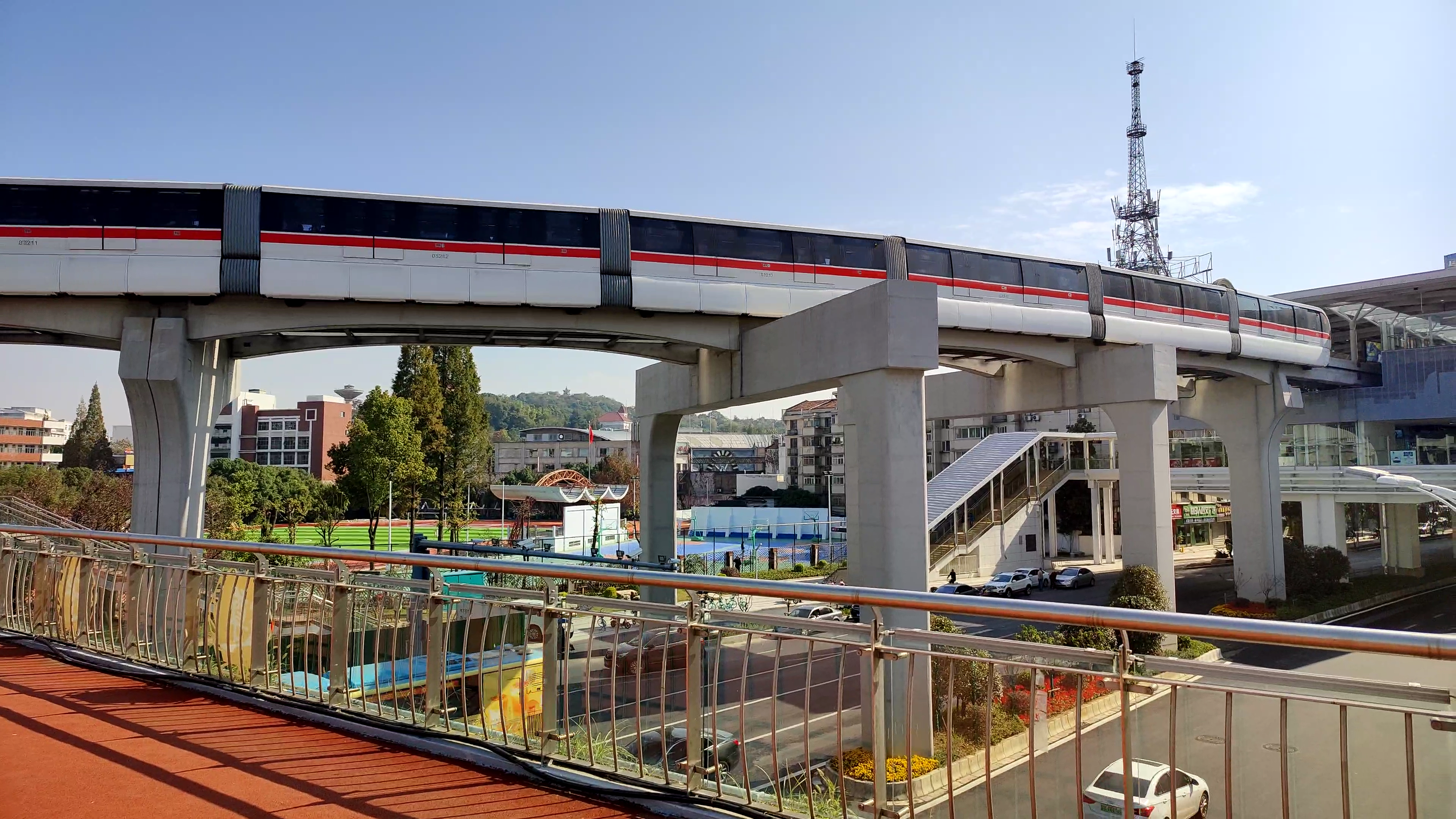
- Wuhu Rail Transit Line 1 Monorail

Overview
- Native name: 芜湖轨道交通
- Locale: Wuhu, Anhui, China
- Transit type: Rapid transit
- Number of lines: 2
- Number of stations: 36

Operation
- Began operation: 3 November 2021; 5 years ago

Technical
- System length: 46.2 km (28.7 mi)
System map

Wuhu Rail Transit
- Traditional Chinese: 蕪湖軌道交通
- Simplified Chinese: 芜湖轨道交通
Transcriptions
Standard Mandarin
- Hanyu Pinyin: Wúhú Guǐdào Jiāotōng

Wuhu Rail Transit is a two-line monorail rapid transit system in Wuhu, Anhui, China. Both lines use Bombardier Innovia Monorail 300 trains manufactured under a joint venture with CRRC. Line 1 opened on 3 November 2021, with Line 2 opening on 28 December 2021.

== History ==
In 2013, Wuhu initiated plans for the development of rail transit infrastructure. Subsequently, on 9 June 2015, the official website of the Wuhu Municipal Government unveiled the "Wuhu Urban Rail Transit Construction Plan (2016-2020)" to seek public feedback on the environmental impact assessment. By December that year the Wuhu Rail Transit Plan received approval from the National Development and Reform Commission.

On 2 February 2016 the State Council of the People's Republic of China sanctioned the "Wuhu City Rail Transit Construction Plan (2016-2020)." Concurrently, the National Development and Reform Commission greenlit the "Wuhu City Rail Transit Phase I Construction Plan (2016-2020), Anhui Province." Subsequent milestones included the acceptance of the "Environmental Impact Report of the Phase I Project of Wuhu Rail Transit Line 2" by the Anhui Provincial Environmental Protection Department in March, with the publication of the "Environmental Impact Report of the Wuhu Urban Rail Transit Line 1 Project."

From July to September, the Anhui Provincial Development and Reform Commission successively approved the feasibility study reports for the first phase of Rail Transit Line 2 and Line 1 respectively. A pivotal survey event for the initial phase of the Wuhu Rail Transit Project Lines 1 and 2 was conducted on 24 December, leading to the commencement of construction at Xilu Station. Following this, on 26 December, the Wuhu Municipal Government organized a construction survey initiative for the first phase of Wuhu Rail Transit Lines 1 and 2.

Progress continued as Wuhu Rail Transit Line 2 initiated drilling operations on 20 April 2017, while on 26 June that year the first pile of Wuhu Rail Transit Line 1 commenced drilling activities.

== Lines in operation ==
Line	Terminals		Commencement	Newest Extension	Length km	Stations
1	Baoshun Road	Baimashan	3 November 2021	—N/a	30.46	25
2	Jiuzi Square	Wanchunhu Road	28 December 2021	—N/a	15.787	11
Total					46.25	36

=== Line 1 ===
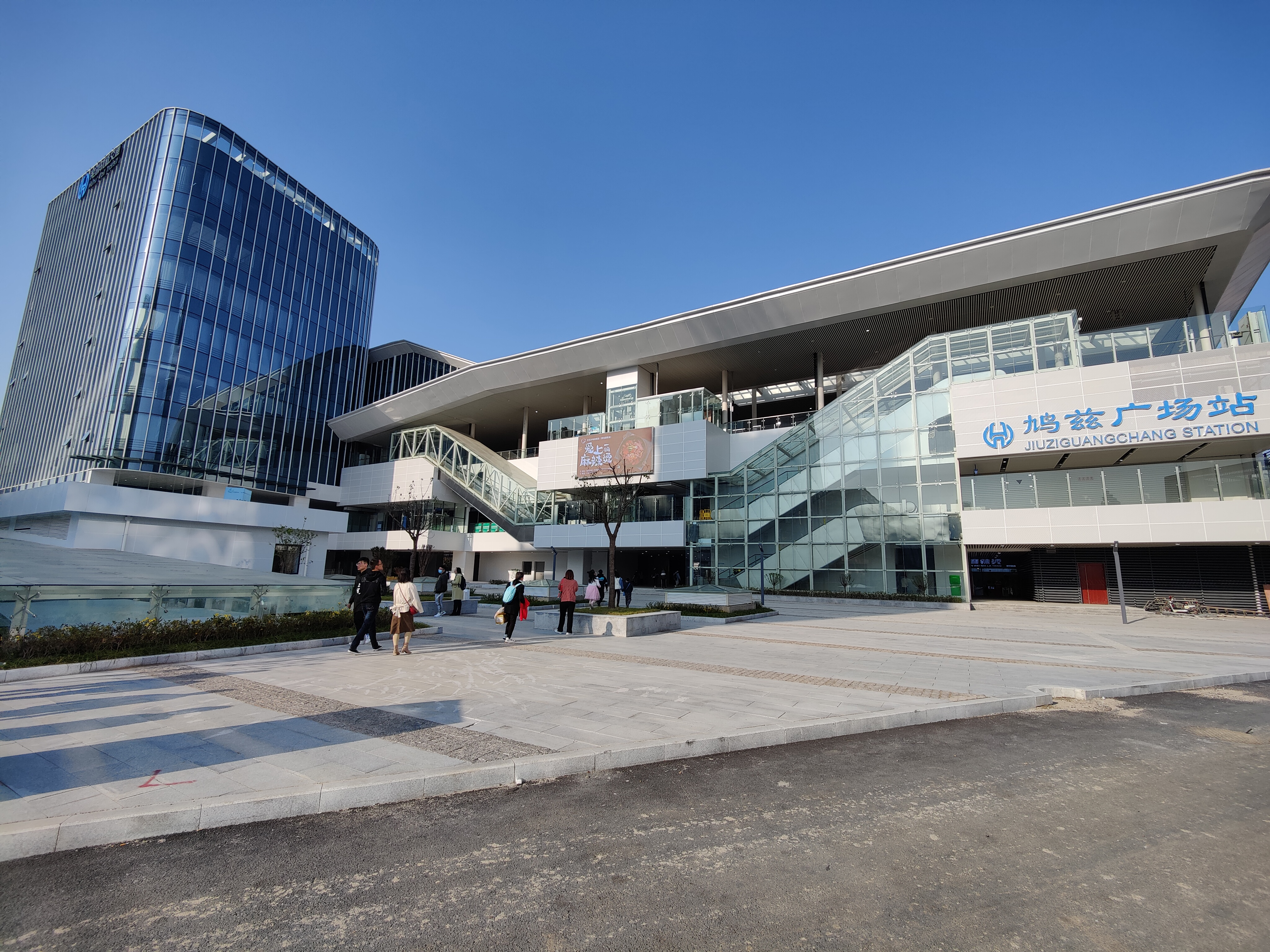
Jiuzi Square Station, which is the interchange between Lines 1 and 2.

Line 1 started construction in December 2016. Line 1 opened on 3 November 2021.

On 25 September 2021, Wuhu Rail Transit Line 1 launched a monthly long trial with 10,000 passengers per week expected to test the line for free.

=== Line 2 ===
The first phase of Line 2 started construction in 2018. Line 2 opened on 28 December 2021.

== Future development ==

=== Line 2 (Phase 2) ===
The second phase of Line 2 is under planning and will be completed by 2025. It will extend Line 2 to Wuhubei railway station.

=== Other plans ===
The system is planned to comprise five lines.
