= Hukou County =

Coordinates: 29°39′14″N 116°16′53″E

Hukou 湖口县
- County
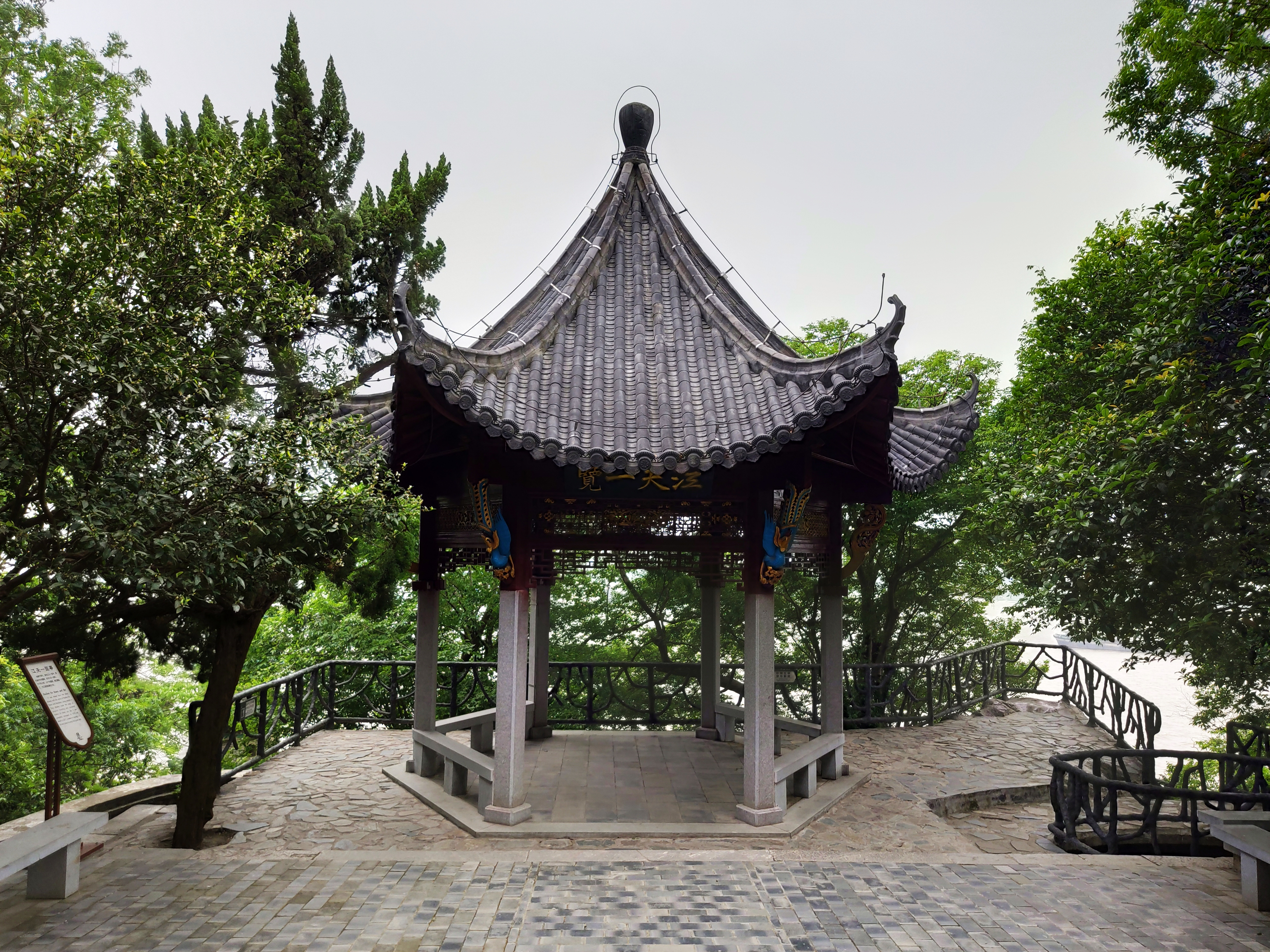
- Hukou Shizhongshan

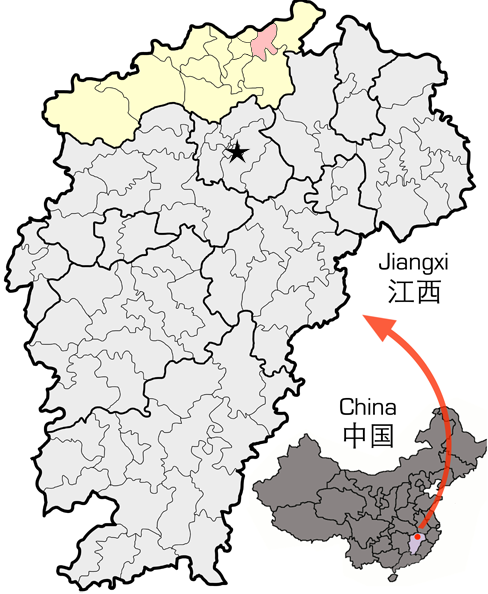
- Location of Hukou County (red) in Jiujiang City (yellow) and Jiangxi
- Country: People's Republic of China
- Province: Jiangxi
- Prefecture-level city: Jiujiang

Area
  - Total: 673.66 km^{2} (260.10 sq mi)

Population (2018)
  - Total: 297,308
  - Density: 441.33/km^{2} (1,143.0/sq mi)
- Time zone: UTC+8 (China Standard)
- Postal Code: 332500

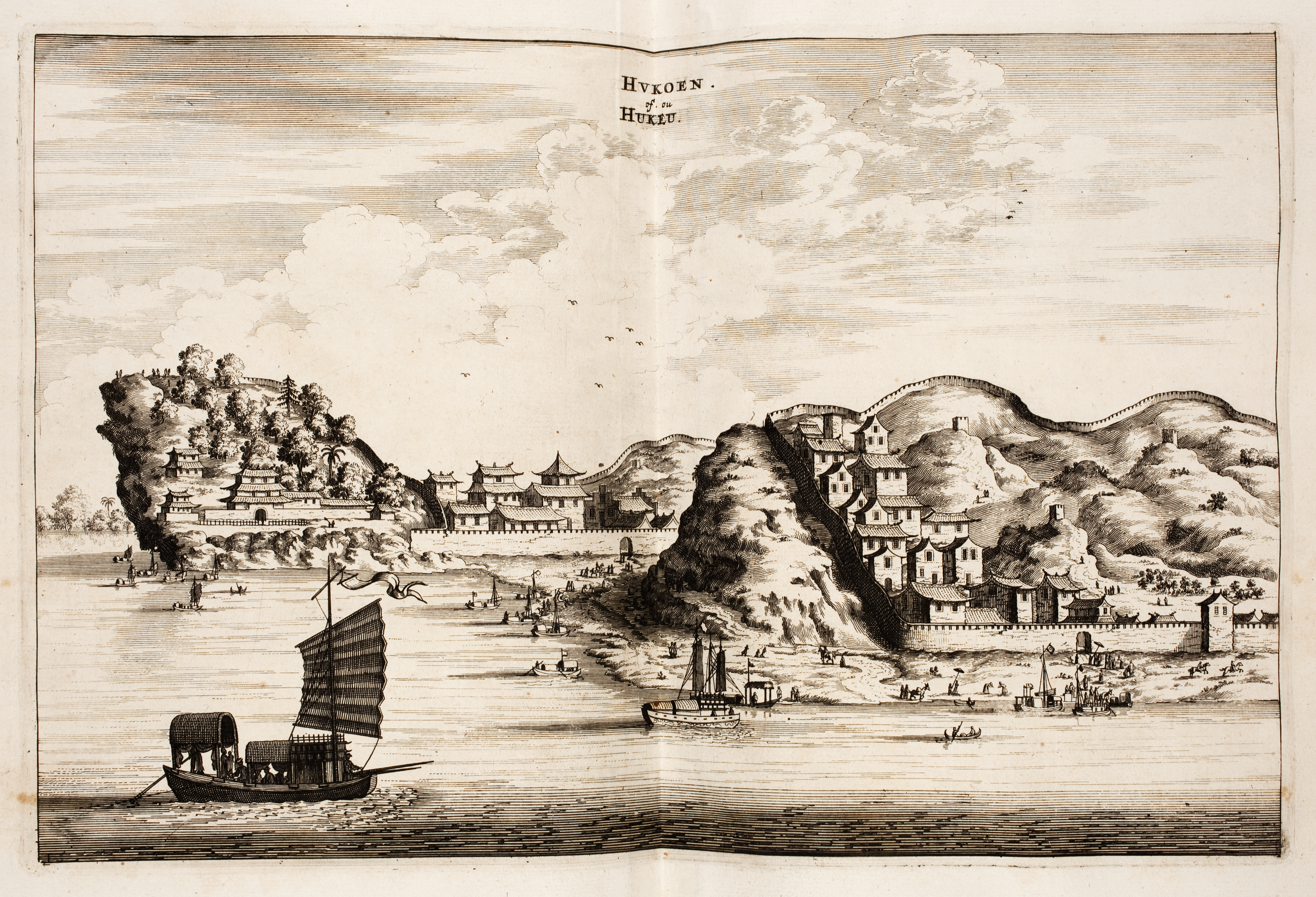
"Hukoen or Hukeu". Nieuhof: L'ambassade de la Compagnie Orientale des Provinces Unies vers l'Empereur de la Chine, 1665

Hukou County (simplified Chinese: 湖口县; traditional Chinese: 湖口縣; pinyin: Húkǒu Xiàn; lit. '(Poyang) lake mouth') is a county under the administration of Jiujiang City, in the north of Jiangxi Province, China, bordering Anhui province to the north. The total area is 669.33 km^{2} (258.43 sq mi), and the population is 285,242 as of 2007.

== Administrative divisions ==
Hukou County is divided to 5 towns and 7 townships.

5 towns

- Shuangzhong (双钟镇)
- Liusi (流泗镇)
- Maying (马影镇)
- Wushan (武山镇)
- Chengshan (城山镇)

7 townships

- Dalong (大垅乡)
- Huangcun (凰村乡)
- Zhangqing (张青乡)
- Wenqiao (文桥乡)
- Fulong (付垅乡)
- Shunde (舜德乡)
- Liufang (流芳乡)

== Transport ==
Hukou is served by the Tongling–Jiujiang Railway.

== Climate ==
Climate data for Hukou, elevation 35 m (115 ft), (1991–2020 normals, extremes 1981–present)
Month	Jan	Feb	Mar	Apr	May	Jun	Jul	Aug	Sep	Oct	Nov	Dec	Year
Record high °C (°F)	22.3 (72.1)	27.4 (81.3)	31.0 (87.8)	32.5 (90.5)	34.5 (94.1)	36.6 (97.9)	39.0 (102.2)	40.8 (105.4)	37.4 (99.3)	33.5 (92.3)	29.6 (85.3)	21.6 (70.9)	40.8 (105.4)
Mean daily maximum °C (°F)	8.3 (46.9)	11.2 (52.2)	15.5 (59.9)	21.7 (71.1)	26.5 (79.7)	29.1 (84.4)	32.6 (90.7)	32.4 (90.3)	28.8 (83.8)	23.6 (74.5)	17.3 (63.1)	10.9 (51.6)	21.5 (70.7)
Daily mean °C (°F)	4.7 (40.5)	7.2 (45.0)	11.3 (52.3)	17.3 (63.1)	22.3 (72.1)	25.4 (77.7)	28.8 (83.8)	28.4 (83.1)	24.5 (76.1)	19.1 (66.4)	12.9 (55.2)	6.9 (44.4)	17.4 (63.3)
Mean daily minimum °C (°F)	2.2 (36.0)	4.4 (39.9)	8.2 (46.8)	13.9 (57.0)	18.9 (66.0)	22.7 (72.9)	25.9 (78.6)	25.5 (77.9)	21.4 (70.5)	15.8 (60.4)	9.6 (49.3)	4.0 (39.2)	14.4 (57.9)
Record low °C (°F)	−9.3 (15.3)	−7.6 (18.3)	−2.8 (27.0)	1.9 (35.4)	9.7 (49.5)	14.2 (57.6)	19.0 (66.2)	17.7 (63.9)	13.7 (56.7)	4.9 (40.8)	−2.3 (27.9)	−12.4 (9.7)	−12.4 (9.7)
Average precipitation mm (inches)	75.0 (2.95)	91.0 (3.58)	139.6 (5.50)	159.8 (6.29)	194.0 (7.64)	242.6 (9.55)	184.9 (7.28)	125.2 (4.93)	65.4 (2.57)	62.3 (2.45)	68.3 (2.69)	49.9 (1.96)	1,458 (57.39)
Average precipitation days (≥ 0.1 mm)	12.3	12.6	15.4	14.3	14.3	15.0	10.6	10.4	7.6	7.7	10.1	9.5	139.8
Average snowy days	3.8	2.1	0.6	0	0	0	0	0	0	0	0.1	1.4	8
Average relative humidity (%)	77	77	77	77	78	83	80	80	78	74	76	74	78
Mean monthly sunshine hours	97.4	99.0	118.7	143.9	165.3	149.9	227.0	216.5	182.6	166.9	135.5	126.4	1,829.1
Percentage possible sunshine	30	31	32	37	39	36	53	53	50	48	43	40	41
Source: China Meteorological Administration
