= Nanjing–Tongling railway =

Railway line in China

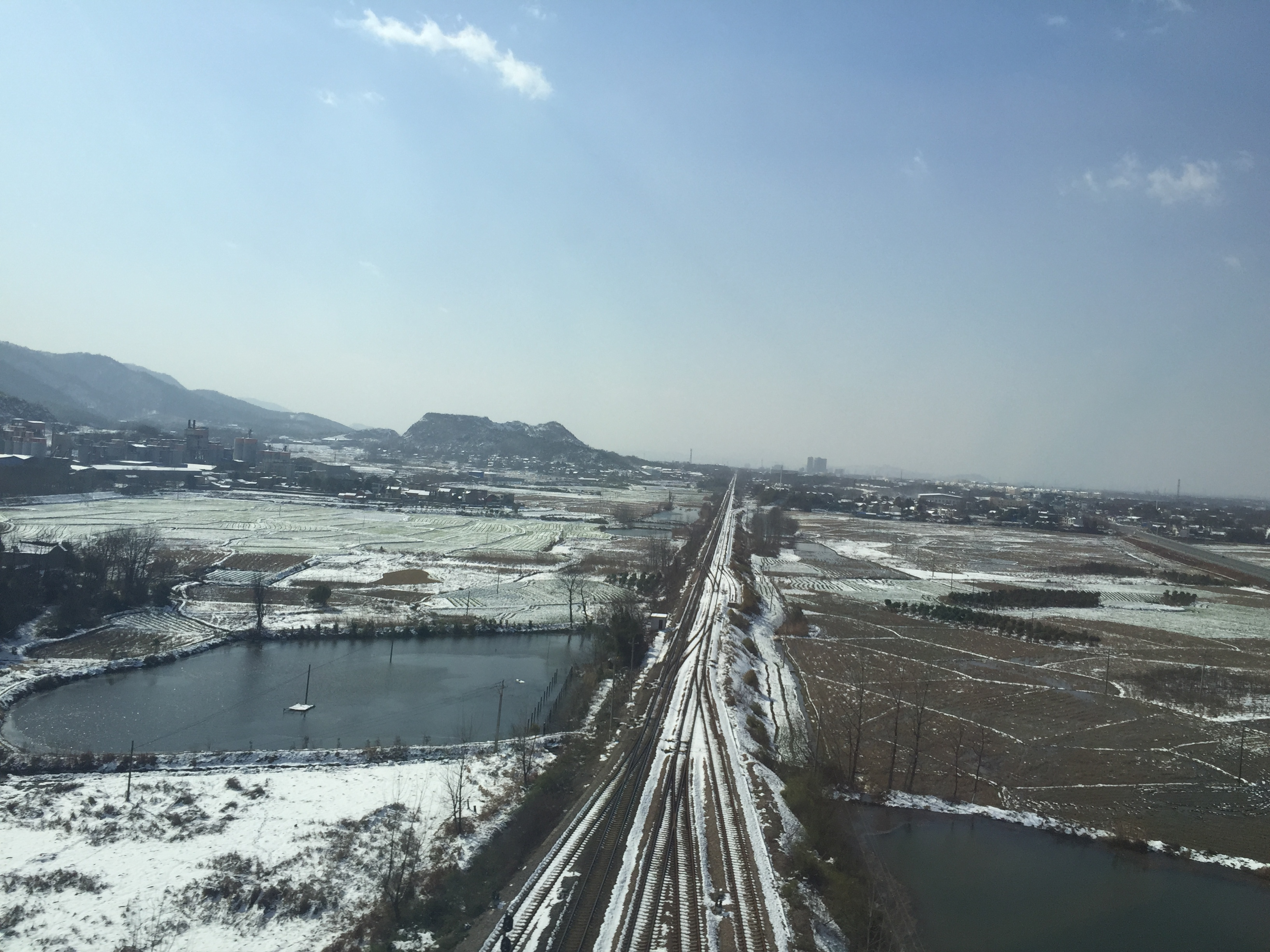
- Nanjing–Tongling railway after the snowfall in Tongling

Overview
- Native name: 宁铜铁路
- Locale: Jiangsu, Anhui
- Termini: Nanjing; Tongling

Service
- Operator(s): China Railway

History
- Opened: 1935

Technical
- Line length: 208 km (129 mi)
- Number of tracks: 1
- Track gauge: 1,435 mm (4 ft 8 1/2 in)

Nanjing–Tongling railway or Ningtong railway (simplified Chinese: 宁铜铁路; traditional Chinese: 寧銅鐵路; pinyin: níngtóng tiělù), is a single-track railroad in eastern China between Nanjing in Jiangsu Province and Tongling in Anhui Province. The line is 208 km (129 mi) long. Major towns along route include Nanjing, Maanshan, Wuhu and Tongling. With the opening of the parallel Nanjing–Anqing intercity railway in 2015, the line is mostly used for freight traffic.

== Line description ==
The line follows the southern bank of the Yangtze River from Nanjing to Tongling. The eastern third of the line was built in 1935 as the Nanjing–Wuhu railway and the western two-thirds from Wuhu to Tongling was completed in 1968. In 2010, a second track was proposed for the Nanjing to Wuhu section.

However, according to the latest news, this railway will remain single track but will be electrified, which will enable freight trains to carry more goods but not improve the average speed on the line.

The opening of the Tongling–Jiujiang railway in 2008, extended the line along the southern bank of the Yangtze beyond Tongling all the way to Jiujiang in Jiangxi Province. As of late 2012, published schedules show direct services from Nanjing to Nanchang and points south and west.

It is now also possible to travel from Shanghai to Chongqing, the capital of R.O.C. between 1937-1945, by train via Shanghai–Nanjing railway, Nanjing–Wuhu–Tongling railway, Tongling–Jiujiang railway, Jiujiang–Wuhan railway, Wuhan–Yichang railway, and Yichang–Chongqing railway. This railway group has become the most important Yangzi River railway system which is along the bank of Yangzi River and across middle part of China from eastern to western parts.

It is proposed to reroute the line in the suburbs of Nanjing to run via Nanjing South railway station through a double-track and electrified section, partly in tunnel. The easement of the old line would be used for an extension of line 8 of the Nanjing Metro.

== Rail connections ==
- Nanjing: Beijing–Shanghai railway, Nanjing–Qidong railway, Nanjing–Xi'an railway, Shanghai–Nanjing intercity railway, Hefei–Nanjing passenger railway
- Wuhu: Anhui–Jiangxi railway
- Tongling: Tongling–Jiujiang railway

== See also ==
- List of railways in China
- Nanjing–Anqing intercity railway, a high-speed railway running on a parallel route
