= Anqing railway station =

Railway station in Anqing, China

Anqing 安庆站
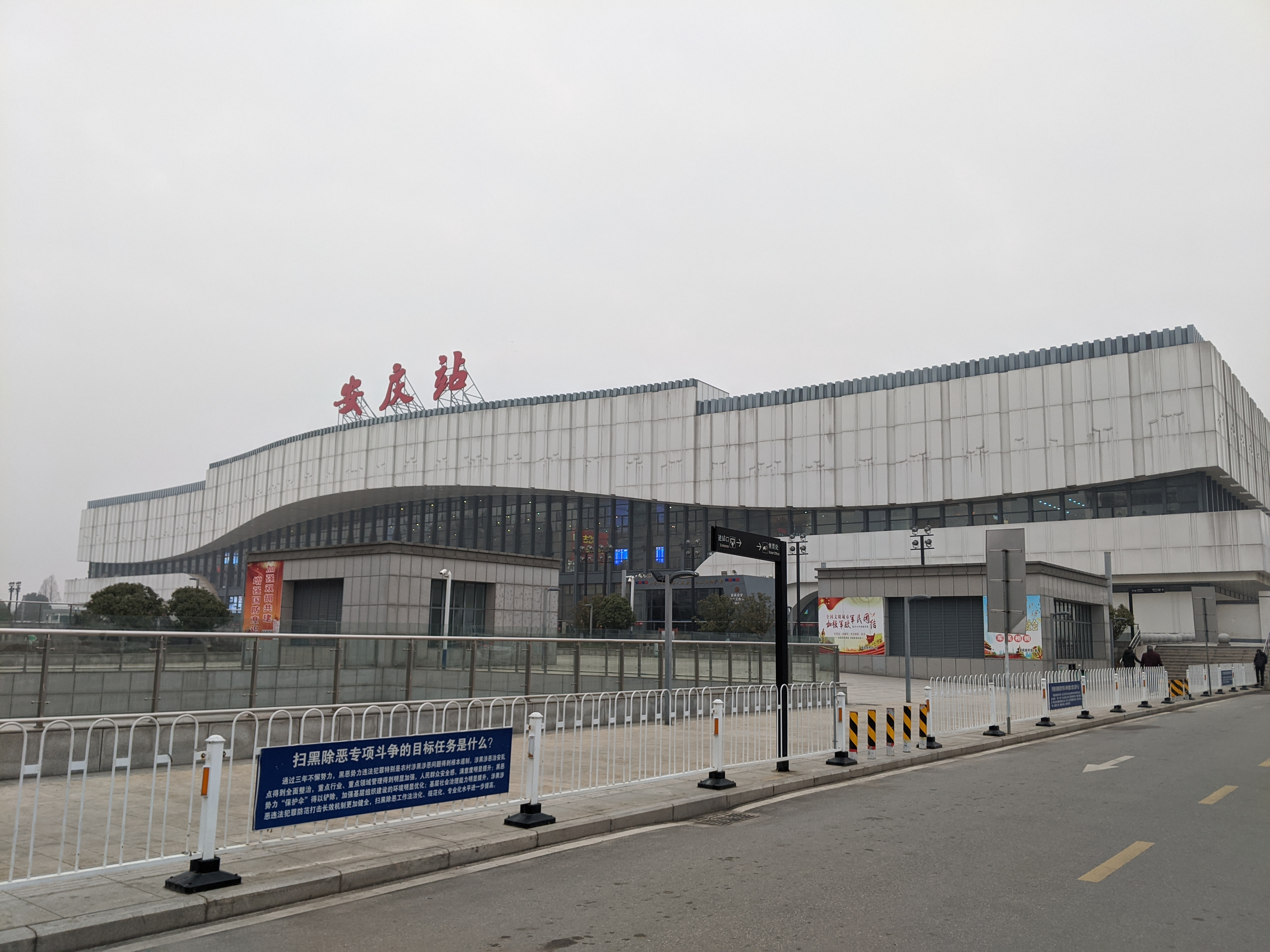

General information
- Location: Yixiu District, Anqing, Anhui; China
- Coordinates: 30°33′7.66″N 117°3′35.14″E
- Lines: Anqing railway; Nanjing–Anqing intercity railway; Hefei–Jiujiang high-speed railway (via branch)

History
- Opened: 1995
Location

Anqing railway station is a railway station in Yixiu District, Anqing, Anhui, China.

The station is the eastern terminus of the Anqing railway, a branch line from the Hefei–Jiujiang railway. It is the western terminus of the Nanjing–Anqing intercity railway. It is also the eastern terminus of a branch from the Hefei–Jiujiang high-speed railway.

== History ==
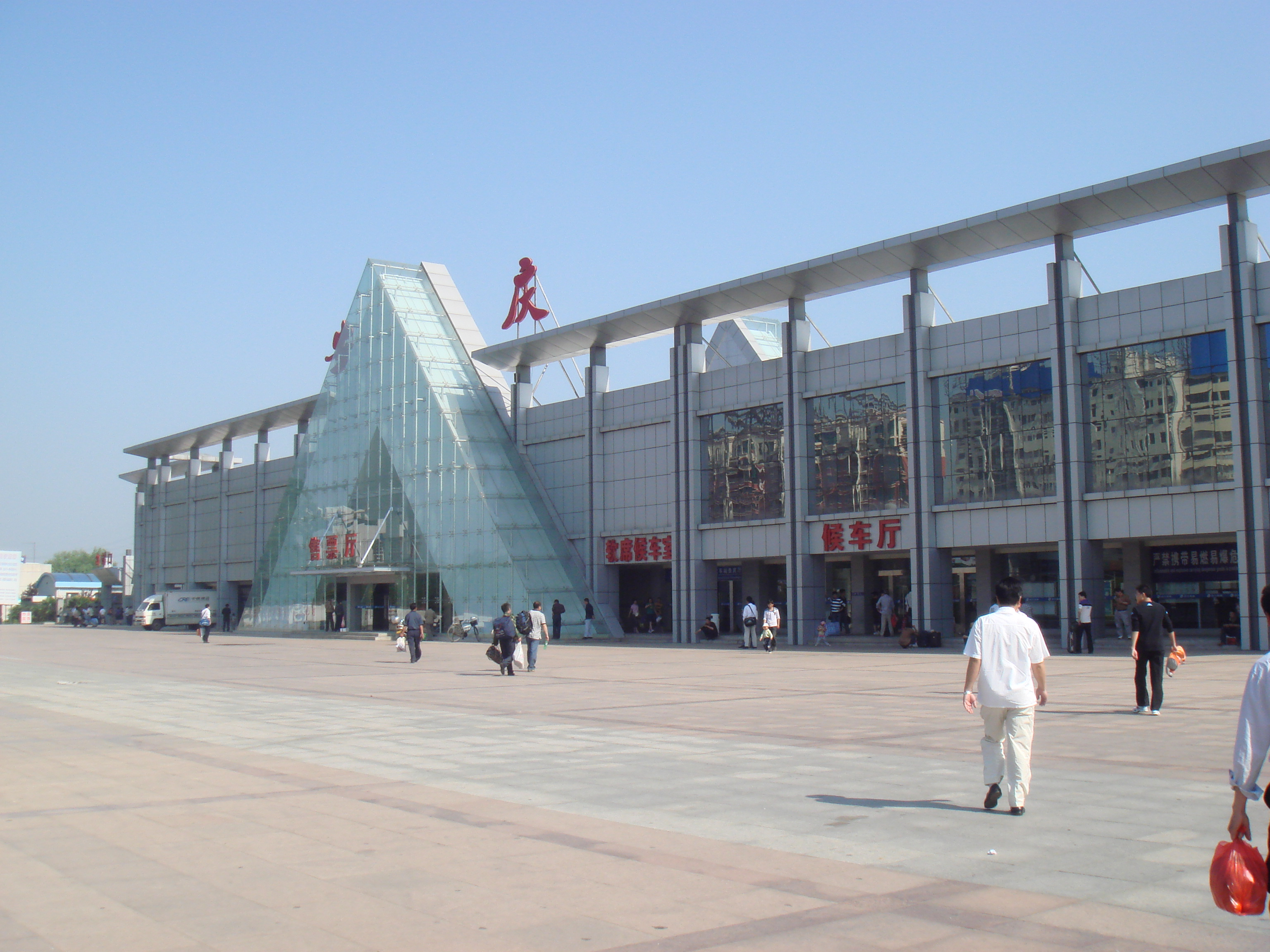
The station in 2009

The station opened in 1995. In 2004, a line heading east from this station to a nearby power plant was opened. This line is no longer in use, but the route east was reused by the Nanjing–Anqing intercity.

A project to upgrade the station in preparation for the opening of the Nanjing–Anqing intercity railway began in May 2014. The refurbished station opened on 3 December 2015.

Preceding station	China Railway High-speed	Following station
Chizhou towards Nanjing South	Nanjing–Anqing intercity railway	Terminus
