= Tongling–Jiujiang railway =

Railway line in China

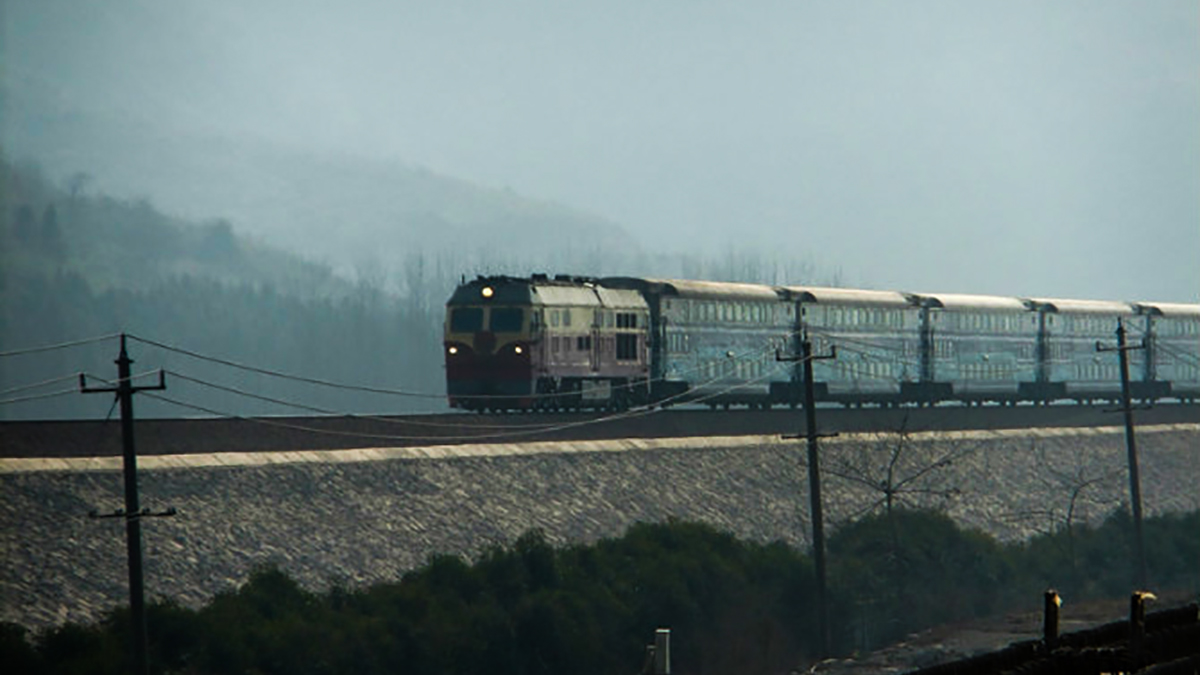
- A TTT78 running on the Tongjiu Railway, taken December 2011

Overview
- Native name: 铜九铁路
- Locale: Anhui; Jiangxi
- Termini: Tongling; Jiujiang

Service
- Operator: China Railway

History
- Opened: 1 July 2008

Technical
- Line length: 251 km (156 mi)
- Number of tracks: 1
- Track gauge: 1,435 mm (4 ft 8 1/2 in)
- Operating speed: 140 km/h (87 mph)

The Tongling–Jiujiang railway or Tongjiu railway (simplified Chinese: 铜九铁路; traditional Chinese: 銅九鐵路; pinyin: tóngjǐu tiělù), is a single-track railroad in eastern China between Tongling in Anhui Province and Jiujiang in Jiangxi Province. The line is 251 km (156 mi) long and follows the south bank of the Yangtze River. Major cities and towns along route include Tongling, Chizhou, Dongzhi County, Pengze, Hukou County and Jiujiang.

== Line description ==
The line follows the southern bank of the Yangtze River from Tongling to Hukou and crosses Poyang Lake to Jiujiang. The Tongjiu railway was built from May 2005 to March 2008. Freight service began on July 1, 2008 and passenger service followed on September 1, 2008.

The Tongling–Jiujiang railway, together with the Nanjing–Tongling railway constructed earlier, form a rail line along the Yangtze's right bank, from Nanjing to Jiujiang. The new Nanjing–Anqing intercity railway follows the same general route from Nanjing to Chizhou, where it crosses the Yangtze to reach Anqing.

== Rail connections ==
- Tongling: Nanjing–Tongling railway, Nanjing–Anqing intercity railway
- Chizhou: Nanjing–Anqing intercity railway
- Jiujiang: Hefei–Jiujiang railway, Wuhan–Jiujiang railway, Nanchang–Jiujiang intercity railway

== See also ==
- List of railways in China
