= Jinghu, Wuhu =

Jinghu 镜湖区
- District
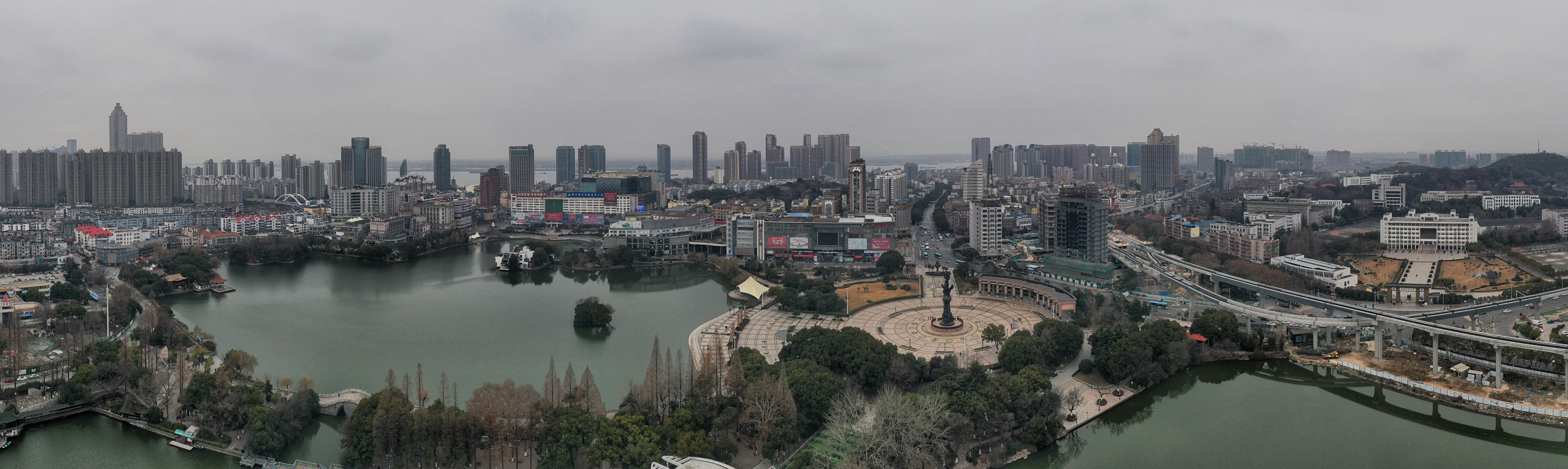
- Skyline of Wuhu from Jinghu
- Interactive map of Jinghu
- Coordinates: 31°20′25″N 118°23′06″E
- Country: China
- Province: Anhui
- Prefecture-level city: Wuhu
- District seat: Zhangjiashan

Area
  - Total: 121 km^{2} (47 sq mi)

Population (2020)
  - Total: 478,658
  - Density: 3,960/km^{2} (10,200/sq mi)
- Time zone: UTC+8 (China Standard)
- Postal code: 241000

Jinghu District (simplified Chinese: 镜湖区; traditional Chinese: 鏡湖區; pinyin: Jìnghú Qū) is a district of the city of Wuhu, Anhui Province, China.

== Administrative divisions ==
Jinghu District is divided to 10 subdistricts.

- Fangcun Subdistrict (方村街道)
- Zhangjiashan Subdistrict (张家山街道)
- Zhelu Subdistrict (赭麓街道)
- Fanluoshan Subdistrict (范罗山街道)
- Zheshan Subdistrict (赭山街道)
- Gejishan Subdistrict (弋矶山街道)
- Tingtang Subdistrict (汀棠街道)
- Tianmenshan Subdistrict (天门山街道)
- Dalongshan Subdistrict (大砻坊街道)
- Jingshan Subdistrict (荆山街道)
