= Shanghai–Zhengzhou high-speed train =

Railway service in China

Shanghai–Zhengzhou high-speed train 沪郑高速动车组列车
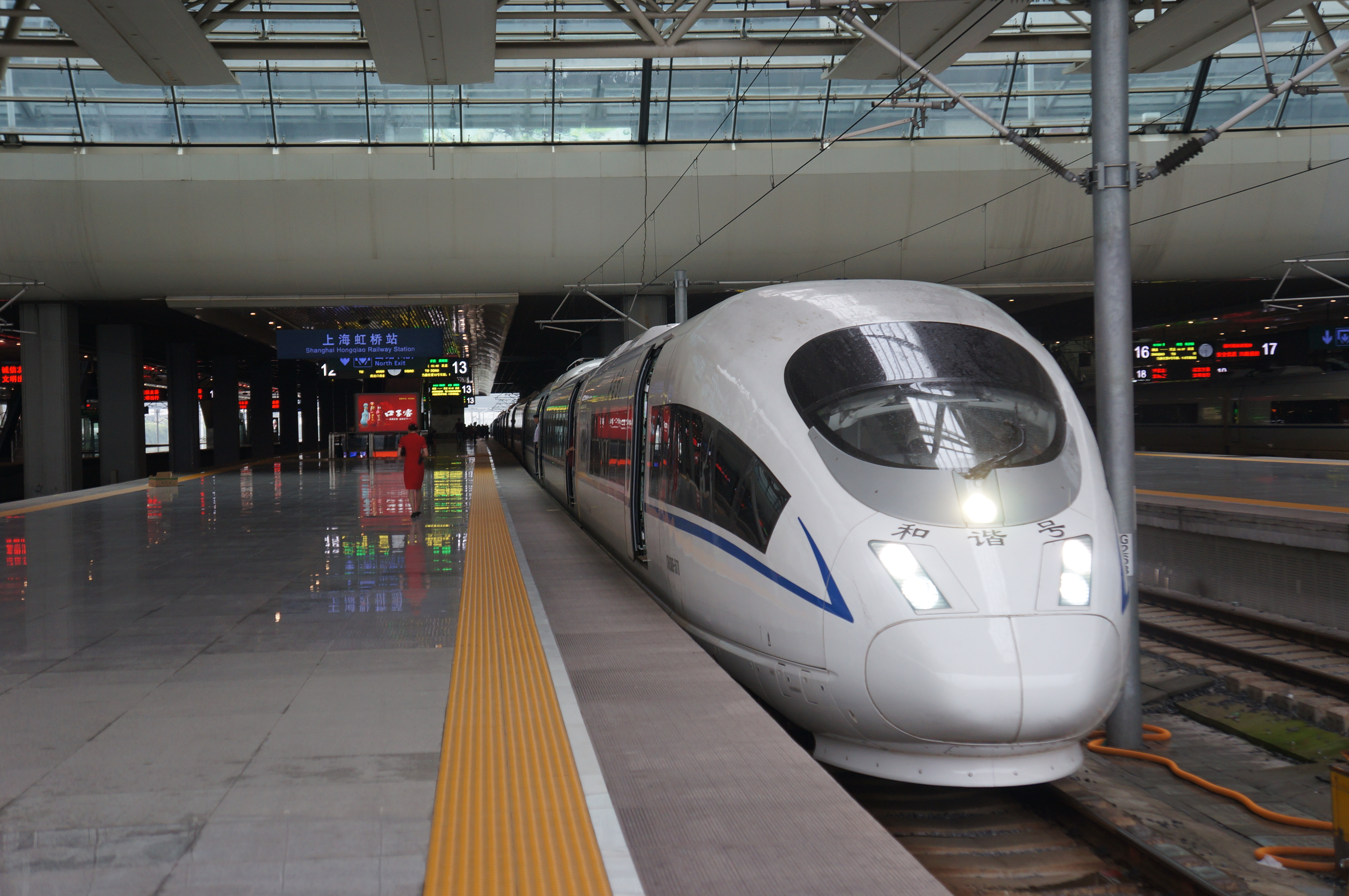
- A CRH380B EMU on the G1822 service at Shanghai Hongqiao

Overview
- Service type: G-series trains
- Status: Operational
- Locale: China
- Predecessor: Shanghai–Zhengzhou D-series train
- First service: 10 September 2016
- Current operator(s): CR Shanghai; CR Zhengzhou

Route
- Termini: Shanghai Hongqiao: Zhengzhou East; Zhengzhou (for the G370/367 train)
- Distance travelled: 976 kilometres (606 mi) (most trains); 1,034 kilometres (642 mi) (G1804/1801, G1826/1827)
- Average journey time: 3h 57m - 5h 17m
- Train number(s): G367-370, G1801-1828
- Line(s) used: Beijing–Shanghai HSR and Xuzhou–Lanzhou HSR (most trains); Beijing–Shanghai HSR], Hefei–Nanjing passenger railway, Shangqiu–Hangzhou HSR and Zhengzhou–Fuyang HSR (G1804/1801, G1826/1827)

On-board services
- Class(es): Business seat; First class seat; Second class seat
- Catering facilities: Dining car; Trolley refreshment service

Technical
- Rolling stock: CRH380B, CRH380BL
- Track gauge: 1,435 mm (4 ft 8 1/2 in)
- Operating speed: 300 km/h
- Track owner(s): China Railway

The Shanghai–Zhengzhou high-speed train (沪郑高速动车组列车) are high-speed train services between Shanghai and Zhengzhou, the capital of Henan Province. Trains are operated by CR Shanghai and CR Zhengzhou.

== History ==
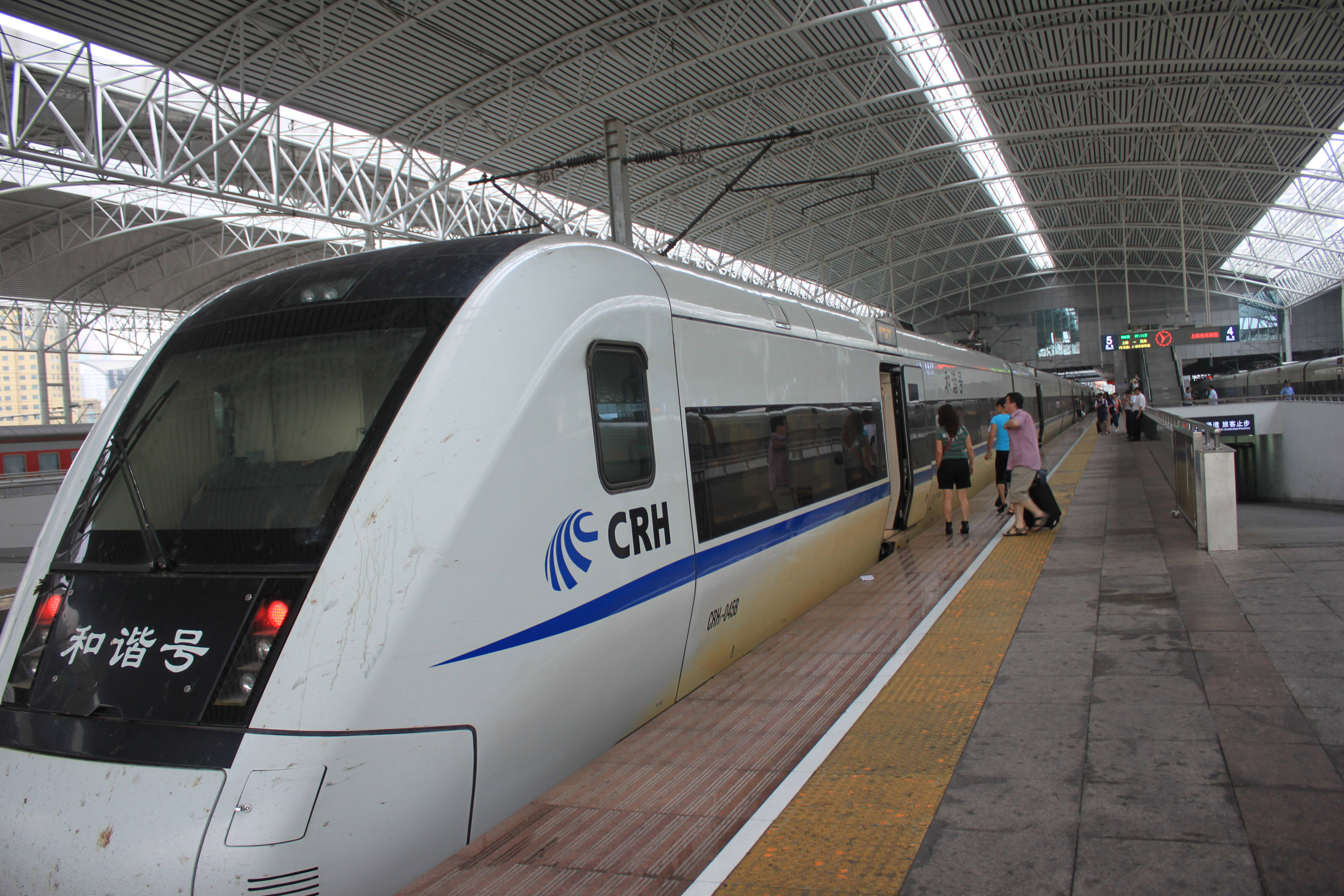
A CRH1B EMU on D86/87 service from Shanghai to Zhengzhou

The CRH services between Shanghai and Zhengzhou started on 10 September 2007, when the D-series trains commenced operations between the two cities on Beijing–Shanghai railway (later Beijing–Shanghai HSR) and Longhai railway.

The high-speed train services (G-series trains) between Shanghai and Zhengzhou was commenced on 10 September 2016, with the inauguration of the Zhengzhou–Xuzhou HSR (part of Xuzhou–Lanzhou HSR). On the same day, the D-series trains stopped services.

== Operations ==
The G368/369 and G1814/1815 trains offer faster services with only two intermediate stops (Xuzhou East and Nanjing South) from Shanghai Hongqiao to Zhengzhou East, and are called as "benchmark trains" (Chinese: 标杆车). The travelling time of the trains is less than four hours (3h 57m-3h 59m). Other trains are services with more stops and longer travelling time.

According to the train numbering rules of China Railway, odd numbers are for south or west bound trains and even numbers are for north or east bound trains. The trains from Shanghai to Zhengzhou travel northbound on Beijing–Shanghai HSR and westbound on Xuzhou–Lanzhou HSR, and the trains from Zhengzhou to Shanghai travel eastbound on Xuzhou–Lanzhou HSR and southbound on Beijing–Shanghai HSR. Therefore, all the train services on this route have 2 train numbers for the same service.

Some CR Zhengzhou operated trains between Shanghai and Zhengzhou have their termini extended from Zhengzhou East to stations of some other cities in Henan, such as Jiaozuo (G1810/1811), Luoyang Longmen (G1812/1809 and G1822/1823), Anyang East (G1816/1813), and Xuchang East (G1808/1805).

- ● : stop at the station
- ↓: pass the station
- —: out of service range
- : Benchmark train

=== Shanghai → Zhengzhou ===
Via Xuzhou East

Stops	G1802/1803	G1806/1807	G1814/1815	G1818/1819	G368/369
Shanghai Hongqiao	●	●	●	●	●
Kunshan South	↓	●	↓	●	↓
Suzhou North	●	↓	↓	↓	↓
Wuxi East	●	●	↓	↓	↓
Changzhou North	↓	●	↓	●	↓
Danyang North	●	↓	↓	↓	↓
Zhenjiang South	↓	↓	↓	●	↓
Nanjing South	●	●	●	●	●
Dingyuan	●	↓	↓	↓	↓
Bengbu South	↓	●	↓	●	↓
Suzhou East	●	↓	↓	↓	↓
Xuzhou East	●	●	●	●	●
Xiaoxian North	●	↓	↓	↓	↓
Yongcheng North	●	●	↓	●	↓
Shangqiu	●	↓	↓	●	↓
Minquan North	●	↓	↓	↓	↓
Lankao South	↓	●	↓	●	↓
Kaifeng North	●	↓	↓	↓	↓
Zhengzhou East	●	●	●	●	●

Via Hefei

- G1826/1827: via Suzhou North, Wuxi East, Changzhou North, Nanjing South, Hefei, Fuyang West and Zhoukou East

=== Zhengzhou → Shanghai ===
Via Xuzhou East

Stops	G370/367	G1820/1817	G1828/1825
Zhengzhou	●	—	—
Zhengzhou East	●	●	●
Kaifeng North	↓	●	●
Lankao South	↓	↓	↓
Minquan North	↓	↓	↓
Shangqiu	●	●	●
Dangshan South	↓	↓	●
Yongcheng North	↓	●	↓
Xiaoxian North	↓	↓	↓
Xuzhou East	●	●	●
Suzhou East	↓	●	●
Bengbu South	↓	↓	↓
Chuzhou	↓	●	↓
Nanjing South	●	●	●
Zhenjiang South	↓	↓	●
Changzhou North	↓	●	↓
Wuxi East	↓	↓	●
Suzhou North	↓	●	↓
Kunshan South	↓	↓	●
Shanghai Hongqiao	●	●	●

Via Hefei

- G1804/1801: Zhoukou East, Jieshou South, Fuyang West, Yingshang North, Huainan South, Hefei, Nanjing South, Zhenjiang South, Suzhou North

== Rolling stocks ==
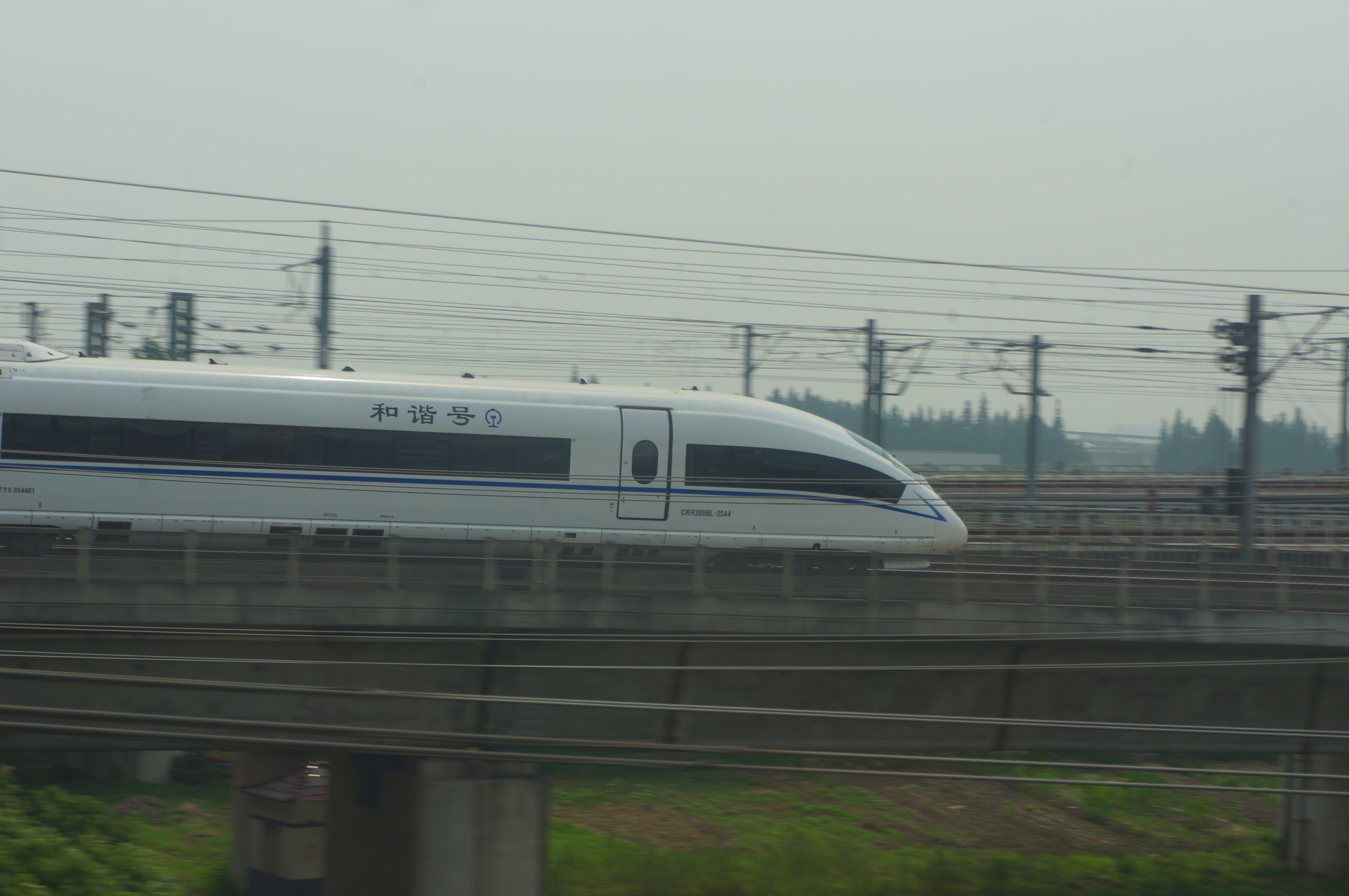
A CRH380BL EMU on train 1806 service

The services are operated by CRH380B or CRH380BL trainsets.

== Other services ==
The services between Shanghai and Xi'an (G359-362, G1911-1918 and G1920-1942), Lanzhou (G1972/1969 and G1970/1971), Chongqing (G1974/1975 and G1976/1973), and between Zhengzhou and Ningbo (G1866/1867 and G1868/1865) also provide services between Shanghai and Zhengzhou.
