= Huainan East railway station =

Railway station in Anhui, China

Huainan East Railway Station 淮南东站
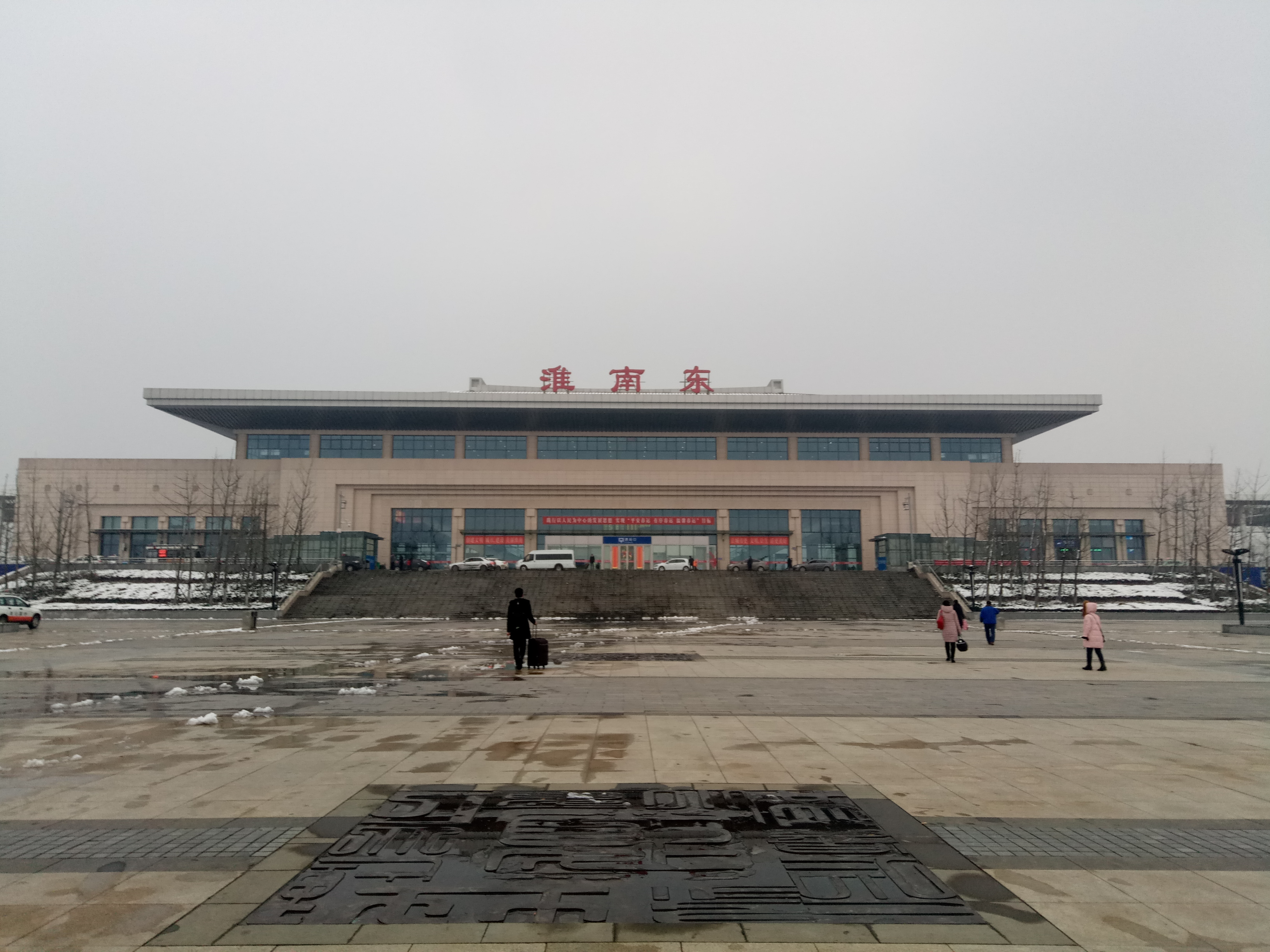
- Huainan East Railway Station

General information
- Other names: Huainandong
- Location: Datong District, Huainan, Anhui; China
- Coordinates: 32.64712°N 117.14644°E
- Line(s): Hefei–Bengbu high-speed railway
- Platforms: 4 (2 side, 2 island)

Other information
- Station code: TMIS code: 19430; Telegraph code: HOH; Pinyin code: HND
- Classification: Second class station

History
- Opened: 17 October 2012

Huainan East Railway Station is located in Datong District, Huainan, Anhui Province. It is served by the Hefei–Bengbu high-speed railway. A new economic development zone called Binhu New Area (滨湖新区) is planned to be built near the station.

== See also ==
- Huainan South railway station
- Huainan railway station

Preceding station	China Railway High-speed	Following station
Shuijiahu towards Hefei	Hefei–Bengbu high-speed railway	Bengbu South Terminus
