= Shuijiahu railway station =

Railway station in Hefei, Anhui

Shuijiahu 水家湖
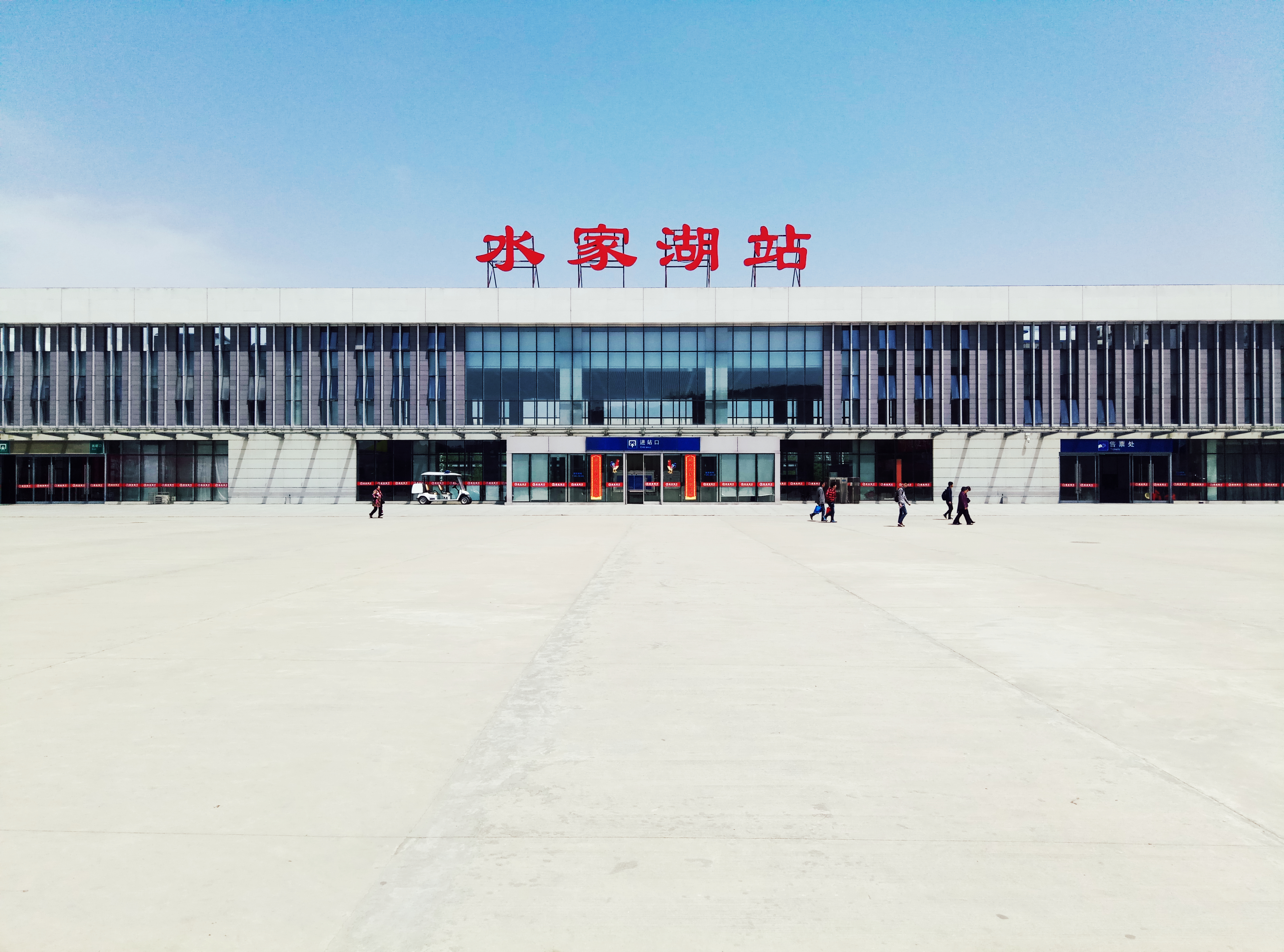
- The station building in 2017

General information
- Location: Changfeng County, Hefei, Anhui; China
- Coordinates: 32.4851°N 117.1634°E
- Lines: Shuijiahu–Bengbu railway (freight only); Hefei–Bengbu high-speed railway; Shangqiu–Hangzhou high-speed railway

History
- Opened: 1944
Location

Shuijiahu railway station (Chinese: 水家湖站) is a railway station in Changfeng County, Hefei, Anhui, China.

== History ==
The station was built in 1944. In 2009, it was rebuilt 300m metres north however in October passenger services ceased.

The station was reopened on 16 October 2012 as a stop on the newly built Hefei–Bengbu high-speed railway.

On 1 December 2019, the Shangqiu–Hangzhou high-speed railway opened.

Preceding station	China Railway High-speed	Following station
Hefei Beicheng towards Hefei	Hefei–Bengbu high-speed railway	Huainan East towards Bengbu South
Huainan South towards Shangqiu	Shangqiu–Hangzhou high-speed railway	Hefei Beicheng towards Tonglu
