= G1518 Yancheng–Bengbu Expressway =

Road in China

Yancheng–Bengbu Expressway
- 盐城－蚌埠高速公路
- Yanbeng Expressway 盐蚌高速公路

Route information
- Auxiliary route of G15

Major junctions
- West end: G36 / G0323 in Huaishang District, Bengbu, Anhui
- East end: G1516 in Tinghu District, Yancheng, Jiangsu

Location
- Country: China

Highway system
- National Trunk Highway System; Primary; Auxiliary; National Highways; Transport in China
← G1517	→ G1519

The G1518 Yancheng–Bengbu Expressway (Chinese: 盐城—蚌埠高速公路), also referred to as the Yanbeng Expressway (Chinese: 盐蚌高速公路), is an under construction expressway in China that will connect Yancheng, Jiangsu to Bengbu, Anhui.

== Route ==
The expressway starts in from Tinghu District, Yancheng, before passing through Baoying County and Jinhu County, Xuyi County, Mingguang and Wuhe County, before terminating in Huaishang District, Bengbu.
