= Bengbu East railway station =

Railway station in Bengbu, Anhui

Bengbu East 蚌埠东
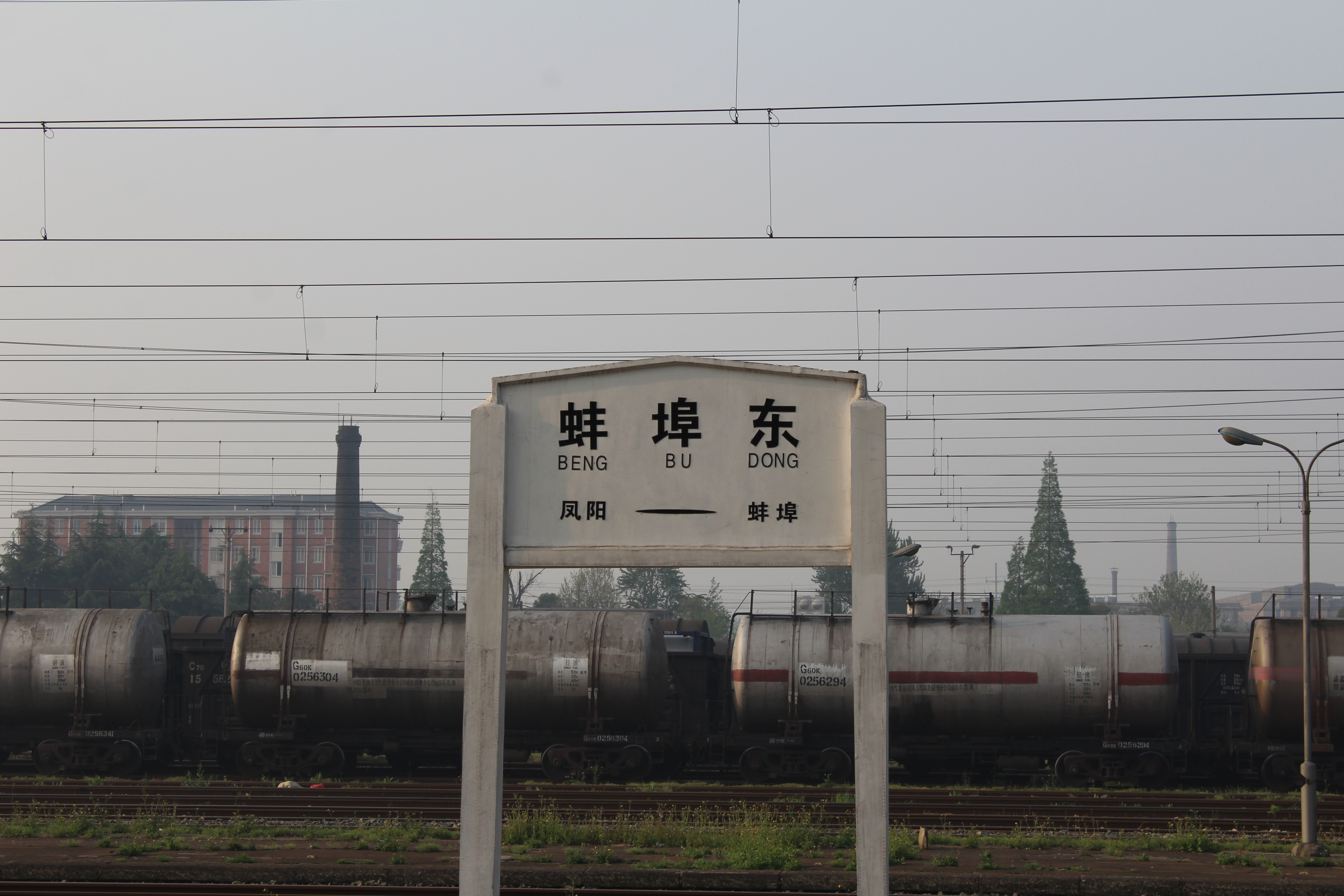

General information
- Location: Longzihu District, Bengbu, Anhui; China
- Coordinates: 32°55′48″N 117°27′7″E
- Line(s): Beijing–Shanghai railway; Shuijiahu–Bengbu railway

Bengbu East railway station (Chinese: 蚌埠东站) is a freight railway station in Longzihu District, Bengbu, Anhui, China.

In December 2002, automated marshalling yard equipment was introduced. In 2020, the station was reconfigured as part of the project to reroute the Shuijiahu–Bengbu railway. The work resulted in the line joining the Beijing–Shanghai railway to the east of Bengbu East, rather than to the west.

There was previously a commuter service between Bengbu railway station and Bengbu East. This was withdrawn on 1 July 2018.
