= Bengbu railway station =

Railway station in Anhui

Bengbu 蚌埠站
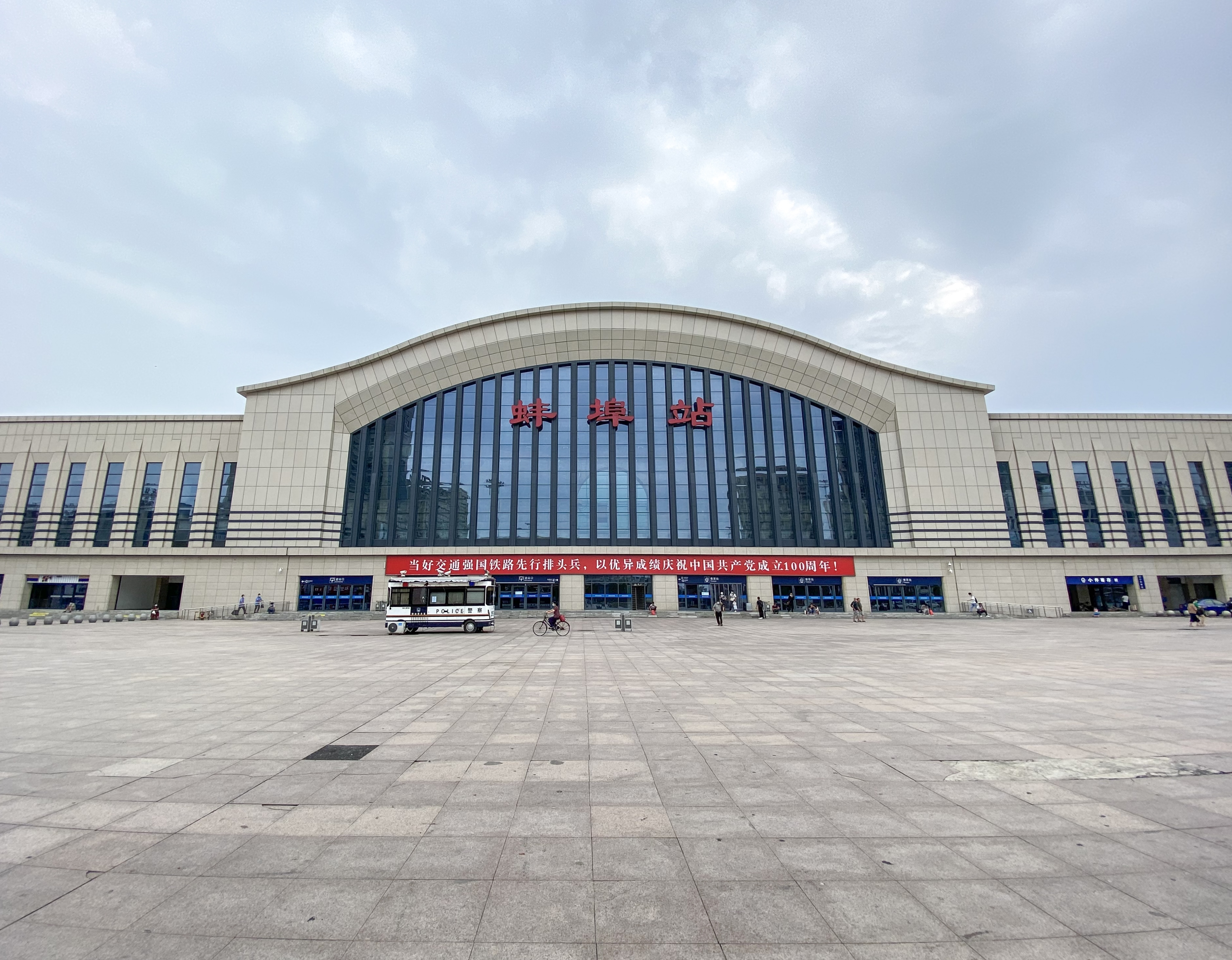
- Station building (August 2021)

General information
- Location: Bengbu, Anhui; China
- Coordinates: 32°56′43.94″N 117°22′18.47″E
- Operator: CR Shanghai Group
- Line: Beijing–Shanghai railway
- Platforms: 13

History
- Opened: 7 December 1911
Location

Bengbu station (Chinese: 蚌埠站) is located in Bengbu, Anhui, China. Construction began in 1909 and it was completed and opened to traffic in 1911. It is a first-class passenger and freight station under the jurisdiction of Bengbu Railway Section of the CR Shanghai Group. It is a station on the Beijing–Shanghai railway and has a connecting line to Bengbu South station.

== History ==
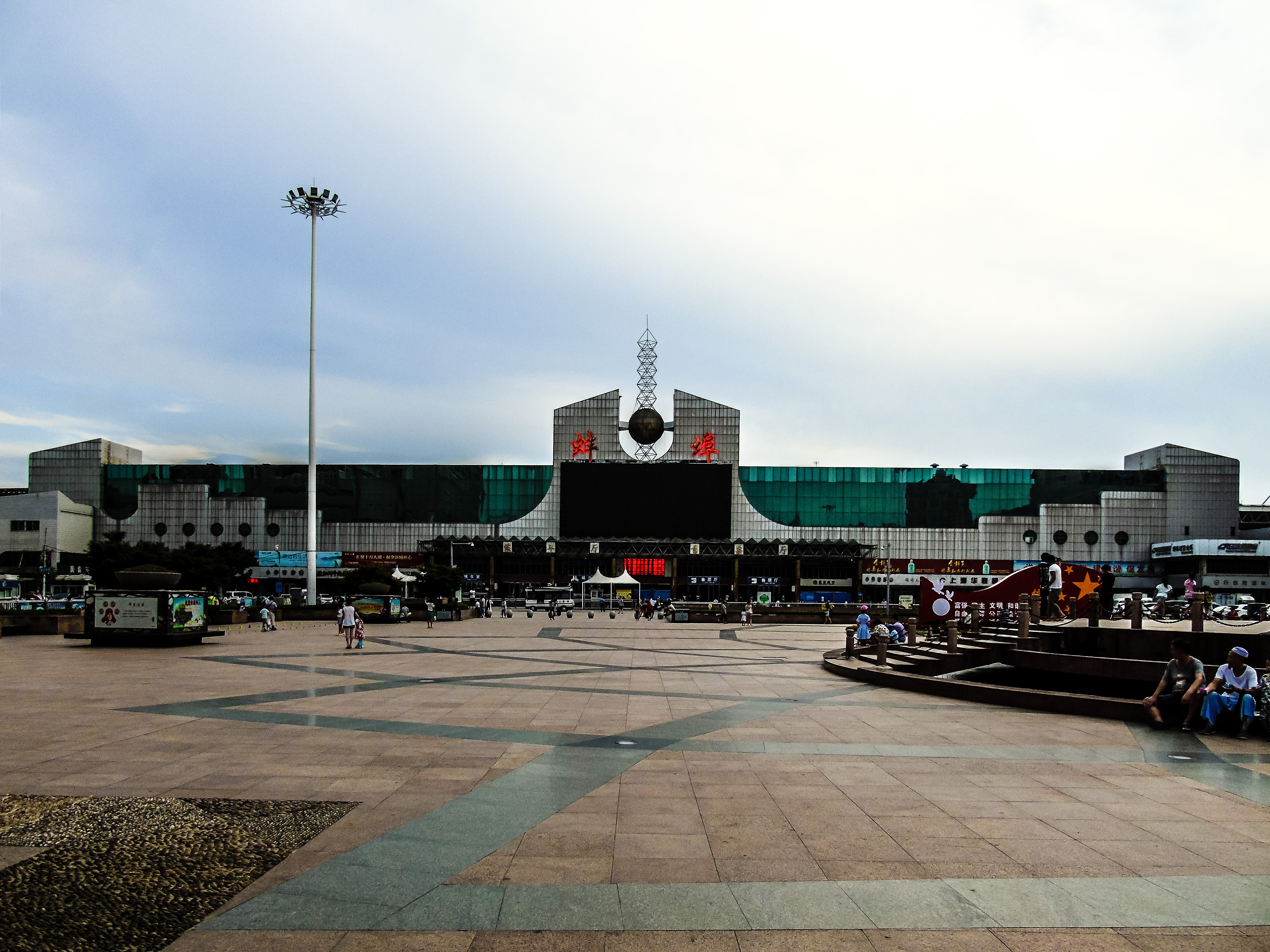
Station building (2017)

Construction of the southern part of the Tianjin–Pukou railway between Xuzhou and Pukou began in January 1909. When selecting a crossing point across the Huai River, the original Tianjin–Pukou railway engineer, Deji, decided to abandon the plan to cross the river at Linhuaiguan and instead build a bridge at Bengbu, arguing that the river's surface near Bengbu was gentle and bridge construction would be convenient. On 15 May 1911, Bengbu Station, along with the Bengbu Huai River Railway Bridge, was completed. The station began operation on 7 December 1911, with the completion of the entire Tianjin–Pukou railway.

From 1953 to 1958, due to the continuous increase in passenger and freight volume at Bengbu station, a new passenger waiting room was built at the station, the number of arrival and departure tracks was increased and the length of arrival and departure tracks was extended. The passenger platform was renovated with cement and other materials. In 1972, Bengbu Station was renovated again.

A new station building was opened in 1999. In June 2002, the double-track bridge of the Huaihe River Bridge towards the station was opened, which made the section between the station and Caolaoji station (north of the Huaihe river, now closed) double-tracked, becoming the last section of the Tianjin–Pukou railway to be converted into a double track. In addition, new platforms 7 and 8 were built.

In August 2010, the station yard at was Bengbu Station renovated and a platform canopy without platform columns was built; at the same time, the platform was raised to 1,250 mm (49 in) from ground level and a new overpass was built to enter the station. The original renovation project also included upgrading the platform floor to granite tiles, but the relevant work was delayed.

From 16 April 2019 to 31 December 2019, Bengbu Station underwent a renovation project, which mainly included three aspects: renovation of the station building facade, decoration of the waiting room, and extension of the platform length. After the renovation, the terrazzo floor of the waiting room was replaced with granite, and the ticket checking method was changed from the original separate entrance to a centralised ticket gate.

During the electrification of the Shuijiahu–Bengbu railway, the line was realigned from the north side of Liufu to Bengbu East (now a goods yard) to bypass the urban area of Bengbu. The realigned section was opened to traffic on 22 December 2020, and the Shuijiahu–Bengbu railway no longer branches off from this station.

== Station Structure ==
=== Station building ===
The current station building was built in 1999 and underwent exterior and interior renovations in 2019. Bengbu Station has three waiting rooms: Waiting Room No. 1 is used for passengers on down-bound express trains and some originating occasional trains; Waiting Room No. 2 is used for passengers on up-bound trains; and Waiting Room No. 3 is used for passengers on down-bound trains and trains heading to Hefei, Fuyang, and Huainan.

=== Station ===
Platform 1

Platforms 2 and 3

From the station, the main line of the Beijing-Shanghai Railway (northbound) is clearly visible in the center.

After the reconstruction, Bengbu Station has more than 20 tracks, including 7 passenger train arrival and departure tracks and 2 main lines. Since the original Bengbu Station only had 1 through main line, the 3 tracks adjacent to the platform were converted into main lines during the double-tracking of the station. The passenger platform of the station is covered by a column-free canopy with a length of 485 m (1,591 ft), a width of 82 m (269 ft), and a projected area of 38,400 m^{2} (413,000 sq ft). The platform and station building are connected by two overpasses and underpasses. Tracks 9-12 are freight train arrival and departure tracks, tracks 13-15 and 21 are passenger car storage and maintenance tracks, and tracks 16-19 are shunting tracks. There is a locomotive turnaround section on the southwest side of the station, and there is also a dedicated line leading to the engineering section and the construction section.
