= Hefei Beicheng railway station =

Railway station in Changfeng, Hefei, Anhui

Hefei Beicheng 合肥北城
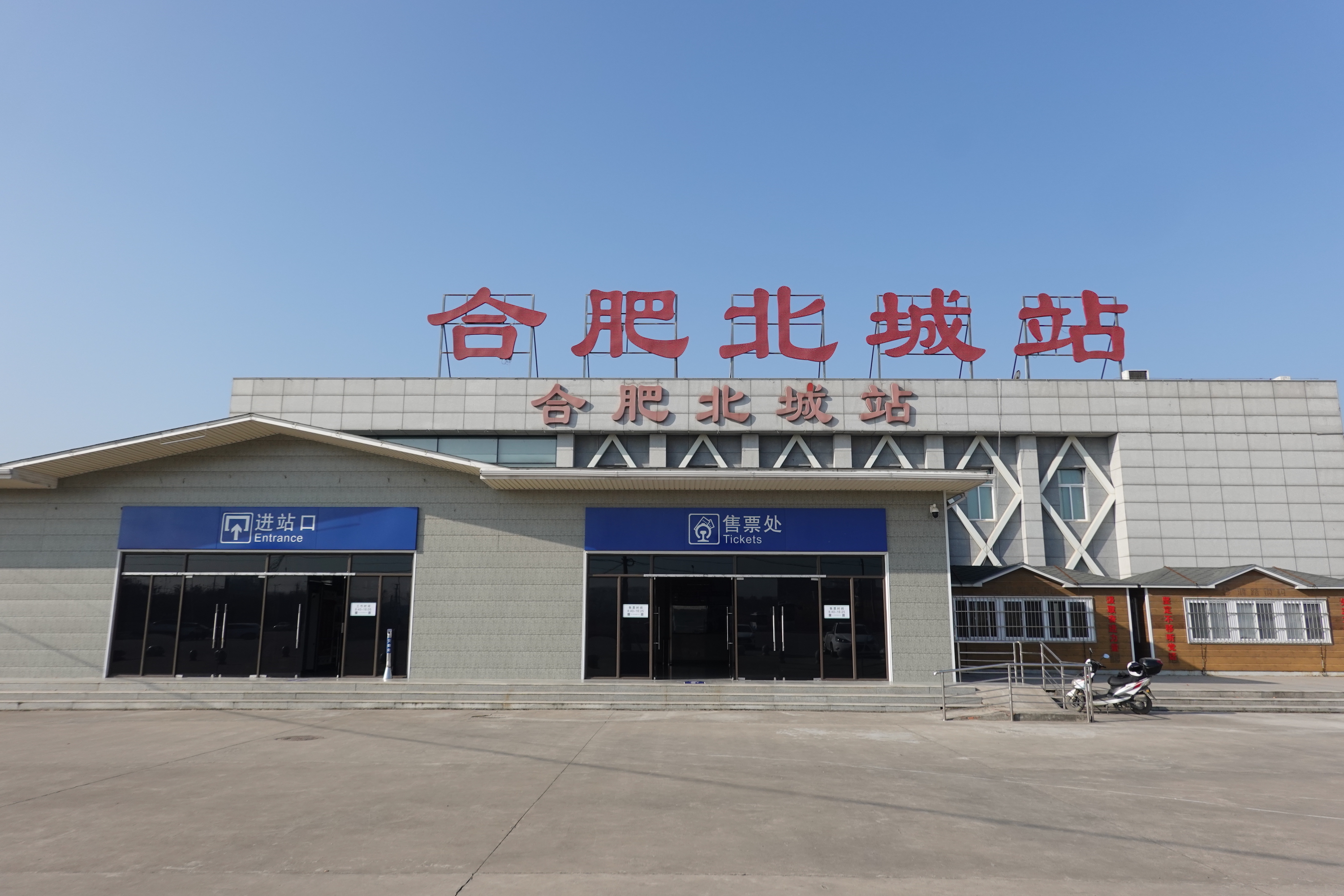

General information
- Location: Hefei North City New Area, Changfeng County, Hefei, Anhui; China
- Coordinates: 32.0654°N 117.2473°E
- Lines: Hefei–Bengbu high-speed railway Shangqiu–Hangzhou high-speed railway

History
- Opened: 2012
Location

Hefei Beicheng railway station (Chinese: 合肥北城站; pinyin: Héféi Běichéng zhàn; lit. 'Hefei North City railway station') is a railway station in Hefei North City New Area, Changfeng County, Hefei, Anhui, China. The station is named after the Hefei North City New Area.

Line 8 of Hefei Metro is expected to stop here. The metro station is expected to open in 2024.

== History ==
The station opened in 2012 and has seen little use as the surrounding area hasn't been developed. In 2018, only two services per day called at this station. In January 2019, the number of services per day was increased to 6.

On 1 December 2019, the Shangqiu–Hangzhou high-speed railway opened.

Preceding station	China Railway High-speed	Following station
Hefei Terminus	Hefei–Bengbu high-speed railway	Shuijiahu towards Bengbu South
Shuijiahu towards Shangqiu	Shangqiu–Hangzhou high-speed railway	Hefei South towards Tonglu
