= SZD =

SZD may refer to:

- Schizoaffective disorder, a psychiatric diagnosis with symptoms of a mood disorder and schizophrenia
- Sheffield City Airport (former IATA code)
- Suzhou Railway Station North Square Bus Station (IATA code)
- The Soviet Railways (Sovetskie Zheleznye Dorogi)
- A microcar made by SeAZ, SZ cycle-car series
- Szybowcowy Zakład Doświadczalny, a glider manufacturer in Poland
- Suzhou East railway station, China Railway pinyin code SZD
