= Bengbu Rail Transit =

Public transport system in Bengbu, China

Overview
- Native name: 蚌埠轨道交通
- Locale: Bengbu, Anhui, China
- Transit type: Rapid transit
- Number of lines: 1 (under construction); 6 (planned)
- Number of stations: 46 (phase 1)

Technical
- System length: 54.2 km (33.7 mi) (phase 1)

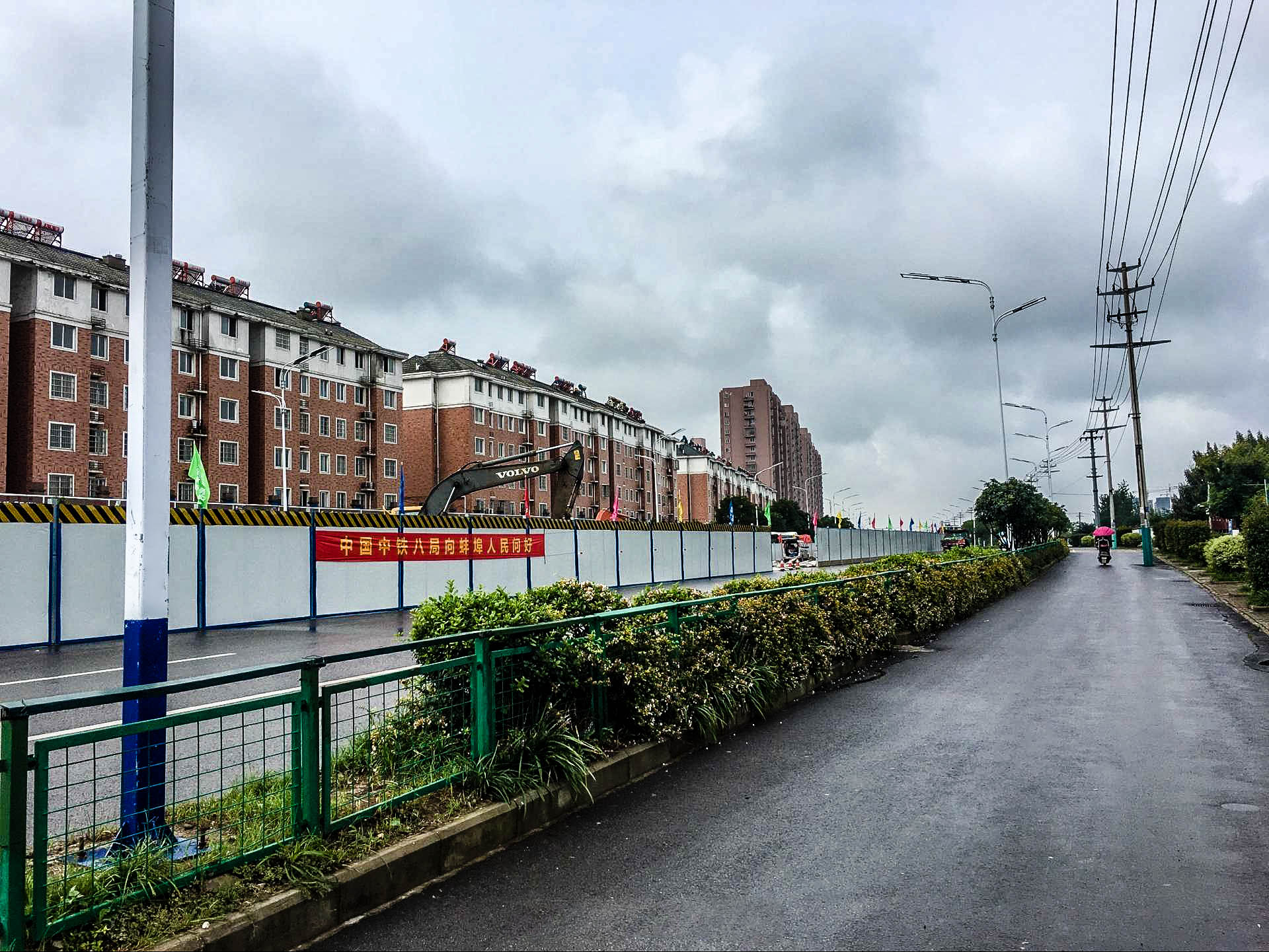
The Bengbu Rail Transport construction site.

Bengbu Rail Transit (Chinese: 蚌埠轨道交通; Chinese: 蚌埠軌道交通; pinyin: Bèngbù Guǐdào Jiāotōng) is a rapid transit monorail system and a tram system under construction and planned in Bengbu, Anhui, China. It will connect the urban area of Bengbu with Huaiyuan and Fengyang counties, which are under Bengbu and Chuzhou's administration, respectively. According to the plan, it will be constructed in three phases. Once completed it will have a total length of 187.3 km (116.4 mi) on 6 lines. In 2020, the draft of the standard of the tram was published.. As of 2026, the tram is still not in operation.

== History ==
In March 2014, the Bengbu City Planning and Design Institute began to compile the "Bengbu City Rail Transit Network Plan". After surveying households and major hub areas, the general direction of the rail transit road network was determined. In August 2015, the plan passed the technical review of the expert group. In March 2016, the executive meeting of the Bengbu City Government formally reviewed and approved the plan. According to the plan, Bengbu Rail Transit will be constructed in three phases. In the initial stage, the construction of Line 1 and Line 2 will form a "Z" -shaped main development axis. In the development stage, a radial track network was formed by constructing extensions of Line 1 and Lines 3 and 4. In the improvement stage, a more complete rail transit network of "grid + radiation" will be formed by constructing extension lines 1, 4 and 5 and 6. Construction begun on an starter section of Line 2 in 2018. In 2020, Bengbu add the plan of the tram.

== Lines ==
Line	Terminals		Planned Opening	Length km	Stations
1	East Xuzhuang	East Fengyang	2023	37.4	25
2	Changnan Bus Station	Huaiyuan Old River Bay	2023	32.7	24
3	Old Shanxi	Zhuhaizhen	Unknown	21.6	15
4	Qinjizhen	Bengbu North railway station	Unknown	37.6	26
5	Renheji	Mohekou	Unknown	35.7	Unknown
6	Bengbu South railway station	Daqing North Road	Unknown	22.3	Unknown
Total				187.3	≅150
