= G1519 Nantong–Rudong Expressway =

Road in China

Nantong–Rudong Expressway
- 南通－如东高速公路
- Tongru Expressway 通如高速公路

Route information
- Auxiliary route of G15
- Length: 52.1 km (32.4 mi)

Major junctions
- West end: G15 / G40 in Tongzhou District, Nantong, Jiangsu
- East end: G328 in Rudong County, Nantong, Jiangsu

Location
- Country: China

Highway system
- National Trunk Highway System; Primary; Auxiliary; National Highways; Transport in China
← G1518	→ G1521

The G1519 Nantong–Rudong Expressway (Chinese: 南通—如东高速公路), also referred to as the Tongru Expressway (Chinese: 通如高速公路), is an under construction expressway in Jiangsu, China that will connect Nantong to Yangkou Port. The original provincial expressway number was S15 until it was upgraded to a national expressway in July 2022.

== Route ==
The first phase from Tongzhou District to Rudong East has a total length of 36.66 km. Construction started in April 2012, and opened to traffic on 6 February 2015.

The second phase of the project from Rudong East to Yangkou Port started construction on 10 November 2020, and opened to traffic on 10 January 2025.
