= Huaibei–Xiaoxian railway =

Railway line in Anhui, China

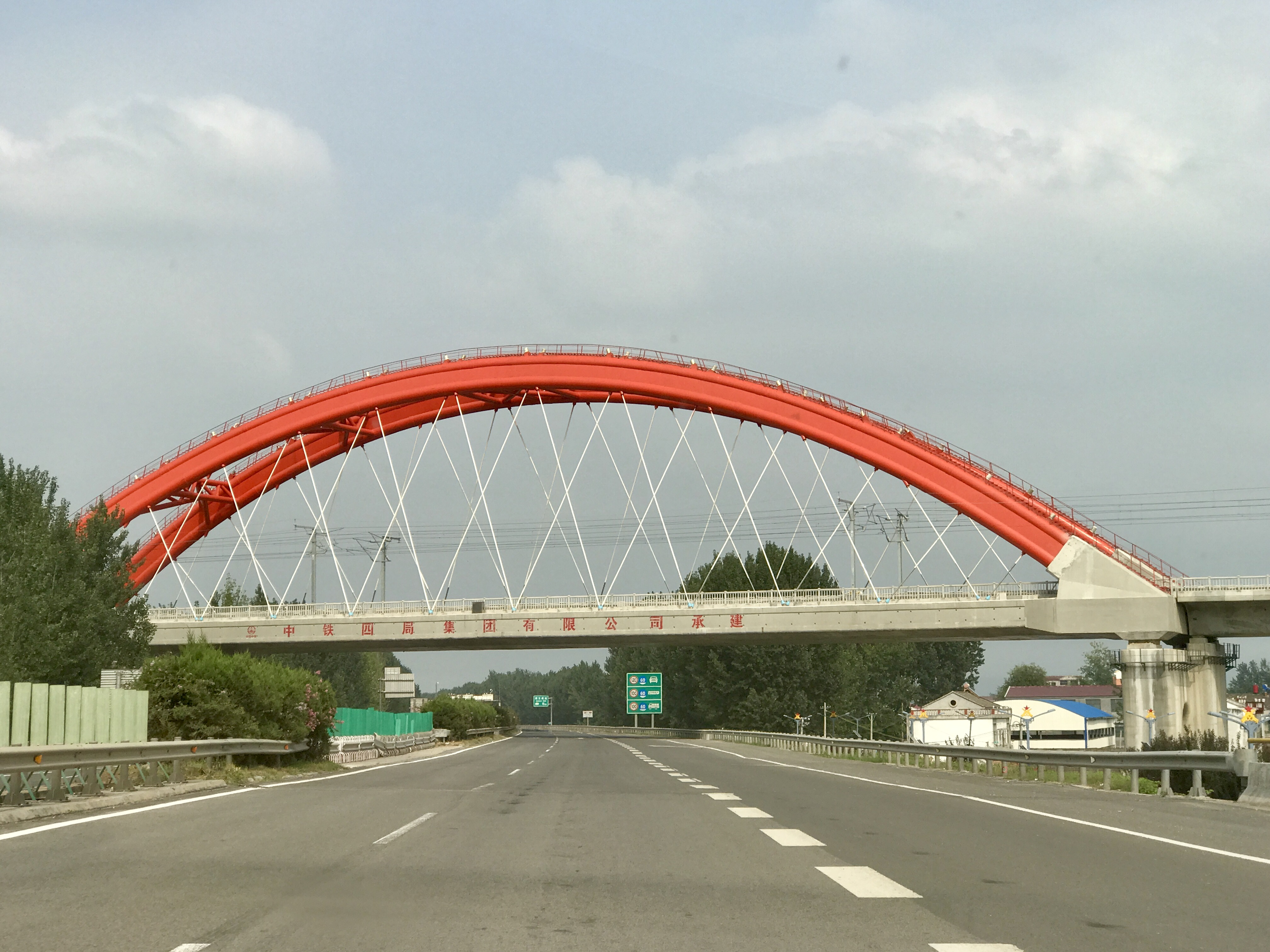
- The line crossing the G30 Lianyungang–Khorgas Expressway

Overview
- Status: Operating
- Termini: Huaibei North; Xiaoxian North
- Stations: 4 (2 in operation)

History
- Opened: 28 December 2017

Technical
- Line length: 27.1 km (16.8 mi)
- Number of tracks: 2
- Operating speed: 250 km/h (160 mph)

The Huaibei–Xiaoxian railway is a railway line in Anhui, China. It is 27.1 kilometres (16.8 miles) long and has a maximum speed of 250 kilometres per hour (160 miles per hour).

== History ==
Construction of the line began in December 2014. It opened on 28 December 2017.

== Route ==
The line starts at Huaibei North railway station and heads north. There is one tunnel on the route, the 2,380-metre (7,810-foot) Gushang Village Tunnel. It joins the Zhengzhou–Xuzhou high-speed railway west of Xiaoxian North railway station.
