= Huaibei–Suzhou–Bengbu intercity railway =

High speed rail line in China

Overview
- Native name: 淮宿蚌城际铁路
- Status: Under construction
- Termini: Huaibei North; Bengbu South
- Stations: 6

Service
- Operator(s): China Railway High-speed

Technical
- Line length: 162.2 km (101 mi)
- Track gauge: 1,435 mm (4 ft 8 1/2 in)
- Operating speed: 350 km/h (217 mph)

The Huaibei–Suzhou–Bengbu intercity railway is a high-speed railway line currently under construction in China. It will be 162.2 kilometres (100.8 mi) long and have a maximum speed of 350 kilometres per hour (220 mph).

== History ==
The feasibility study for the line was approved on 4 November 2020. Construction officially began in December 2020.

== Route ==
The line takes a similar but less direct route than the existing Beijing–Shangqiu high-speed railway. It will have the following stations:

- Huaibei North
- Huaibei West
- Suzhou West
- Shuangduiji
- Guzhen South
- Bengbu South
