= G1521 Changshu–Jiashan Expressway =

Expressway in China

Changshu–Jiashan Expressway
- 常熟－嘉善高速公路
- Changjia Expressway 常嘉高速公路

Route information
- Existed: 31 December 2016–present

Major junctions
- North end: G1522 in Changshu, Suzhou, Jiangsu
- South end: G15; G1522; G92

Location
- Country: China

Highway system
- National Trunk Highway System; Primary; Auxiliary; National Highways; Transport in China
← G1519	→ G1522

The Changshu–Jiashan Expressway (Chinese: 常熟－嘉善高速公路; pinyin: Chángshú–Jiāshàn Gāosù Gōnglù), designated as G1521 and commonly referred to as the Changjia Expressway (Chinese: 常嘉高速公路; pinyin: Chángjiā Gāosù Gōnglù), is an expressway that connects the cities of Changshu, a satellite city of Suzhou, in the province of Jiangsu, China, and Jiashan County, in the province of Zhejiang. The Haiyan hub of the fair, with a total length of 28.45 kilometers, was opened to traffic on the Jiangsu section on 31 December 2016. The expressway is parallel to the Changtai Expressway, which not only can share the flow, but also has an important significance for alleviating the north–south transit traffic in Suzhou. The Zhejiang section was started in 2016 and opened to traffic on 1 January 2020.
