= Shuijiahu–Bengbu railway =

Railway line in Anhui, China

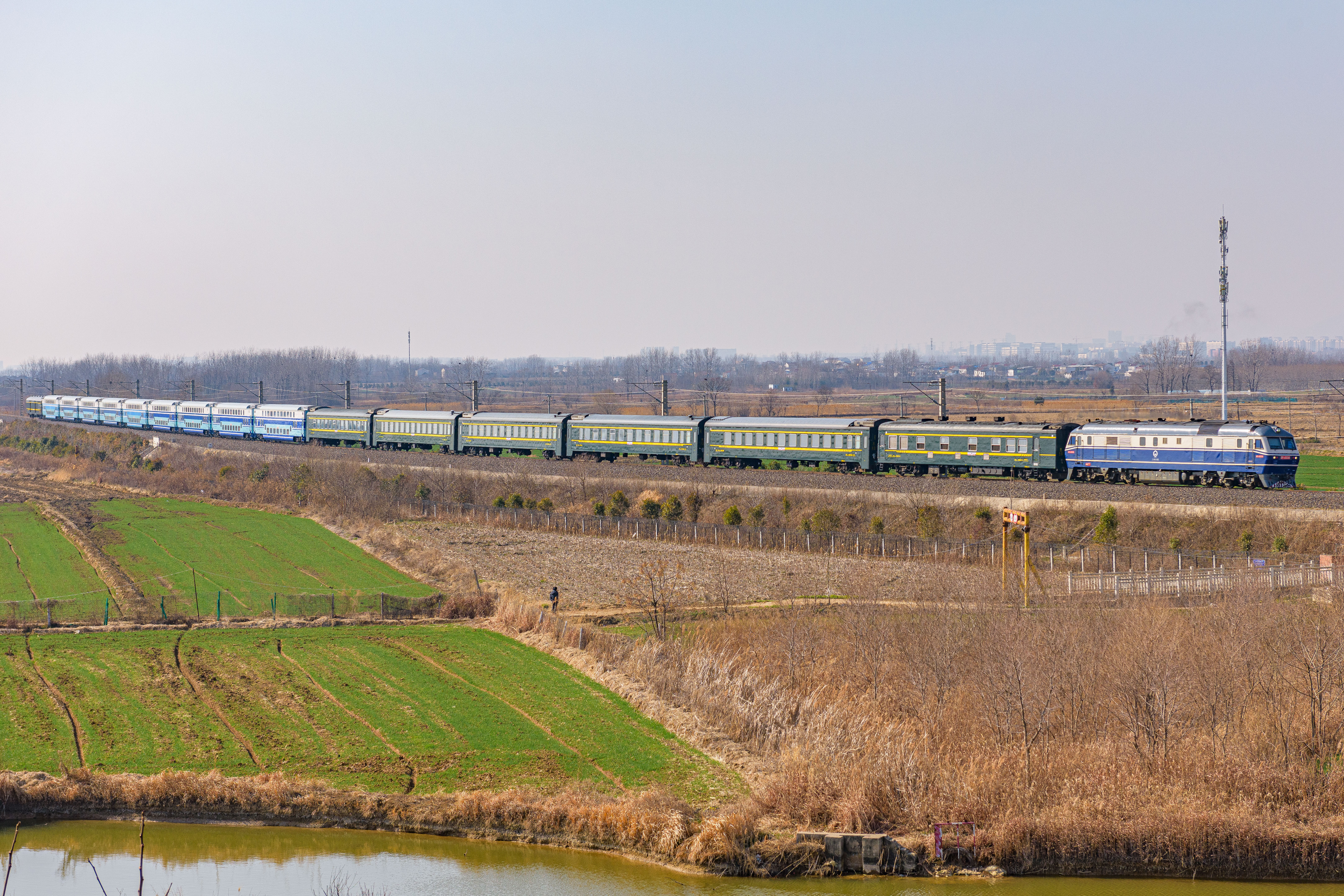
- K8598 runs on the line in 2026

Overview
- Status: Operational
- Locale: Anhui
- Termini: Shuijiahu; Bengbu
- Stations: 9

Service
- Type: Main line railway
- Operator(s): China Railway

Technical
- Line length: 61 km (38 mi)
- Track gauge: 1,435 mm (4 ft 8 1/2 in) standard gauge
- Operating speed: 100 km/h (62 mph)

The Shuijiahu–Bengbu railway (Chinese: 水蚌铁路) is a freight railway line in China.

== History ==
In 2010, a project to upgrade and electrify the line was started.

On 1 November 2018, work began to reroute the railway in Bengbu. The line was diverted along the southeastern edge of the city, away from the centre. The line reopened on 22 December 2020.

== Route ==
The line leaves the Huainan railway at Shuijiahu railway station and heads north. It joins the Beijing–Shanghai railway at Bengbu East railway station
