= Danyang North railway station =

Railway station in Danyang, China

Danyangbei 丹阳北
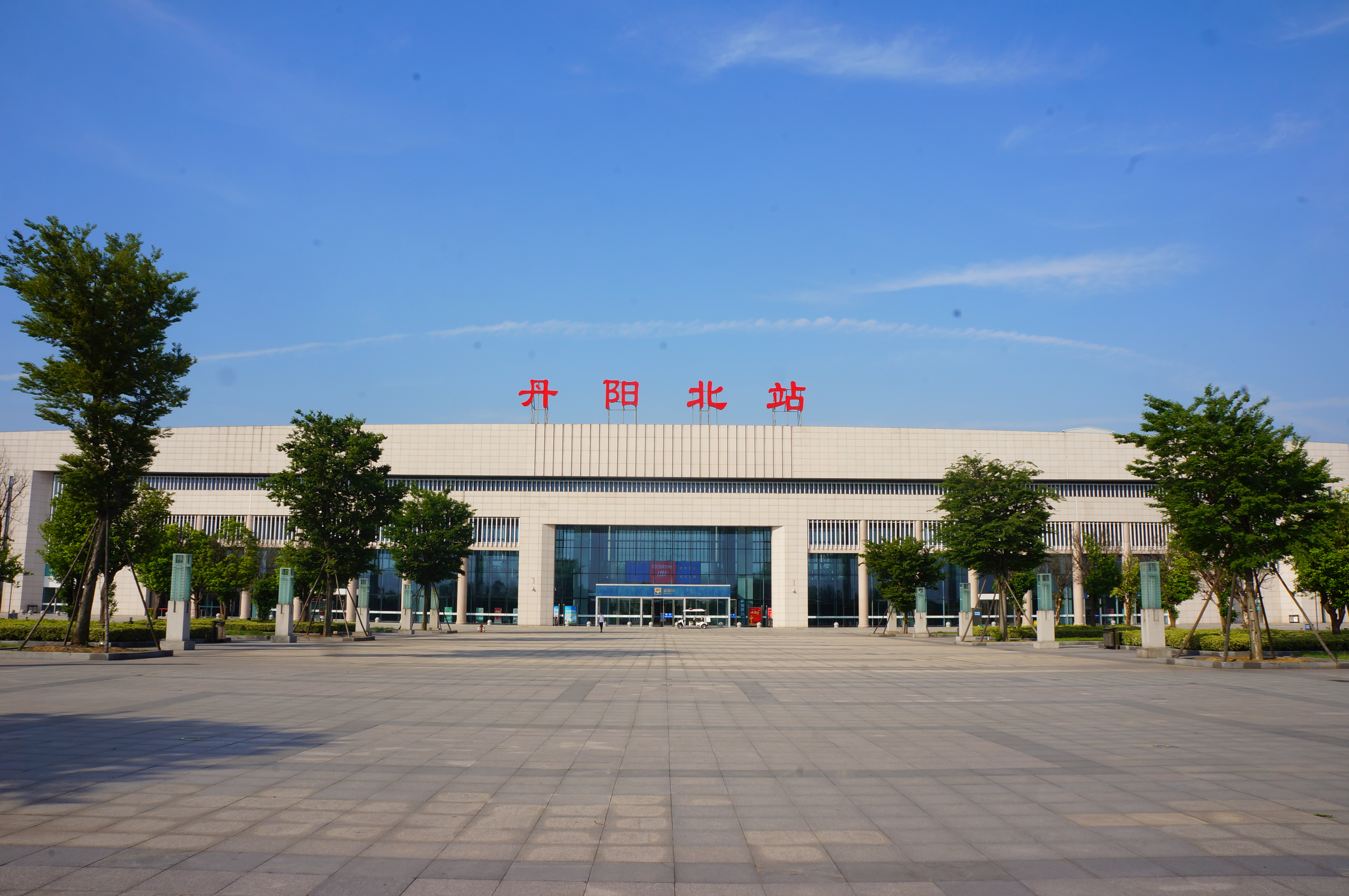

General information
- Other names: Danyang North
- Location: Yunyang Town, Yanxiang Village, Danyang City, Jiangsu; China
- Coordinates: 32.014481°N 119.669094°E
- Operated by: Shanghai Railway Bureau; China Railway Corporation
- Line(s): Jinghu High-Speed Railway
- Connections: Shanghai, Wenzhou, Wuhan, Tianjin, Zhengzhou, Xuzhou, Beijing

History
- Opened: July 1, 2010

The Danyang North railway station (Simplified Chinese: 丹阳北站) is a high-speed railway station in Danyang, Jiangsu, China. It is served by the Jinghu High-Speed Railway. The station is at the northern end of the Danyang–Kunshan Grand Bridge the longest bridge in the world.

Preceding station	China Railway High-speed	Following station
Zhenjiang South towards Beijing South or Tianjin West	Beijing–Shanghai high-speed railway Part of the Shanghai–Wuhan–Chengdu passenger-dedicated railway	Changzhou North towards Shanghai Hongqiao
