= Port of Nantong =

Coordinates: 32°45′5″N 120°48′54″E

Port of Nantong(南通港）
- Interactive map of Port of Nantong(南通港）

Location
- Country: People's Republic of China
- Location: Nantong, Jiangsu Province

Details
- Opened: 1904
- Owned by: People's Republic of China
- Type of Harbor: Natural Inland Port & Artificial Deep-water Seaport

Statistics
- Website http://www.ntport.com.cn

The Port of Nantong combines a natural river estuary inland port with an artificial deep water coastal port. It is located at Nantong, Jiangsu, People's Republic of China. In 2013, it had a cargo throughput of 205 million tonnes, a growth of 10.6% over 2012. Container throughput reached 600,500 TEU, a growth of 19.1%.

== Layout ==
Nantong Port has 4,166m of Yangtze river quayside, 88 berths, 24 berths over 1,000DWT, or which 14 over 10,000DWT. 65ha of yard space and 5.3ha of warehouses.

Nantong Port has nine river port areas and three coastal port areas.

COASTAL PORT AREAS:

- Yangkou Port Area (洋口港区)
- Lüsi Port Area (吕四港区)
- Lengjiasha Port Area (冷家沙港区)

RIVER PORT AREAS:

- Rugao Port Area (如皋港区) : services the Rugao Economic Development Area, focuses on oil products, liquid chemicals and general cargo.
- Tiansheng Port Area (天生港区): services several power stations and the Gangzha Harborfront Industrial Area.
- Nantong Port Area (南通港区): focuses on general cargo and passengers
- Rengang Port Area (任港港区): focuses on services COSCO and the COSCO-Kawasaki Shipyard.
- Langshan Port Area (狼山港区): focuses on bulk cargo, containers and break bulk
- Fumin Port Area (富民港区): services the International Nantong Technology Economic Development Area
- Jianghai Port Area (江海港区): focuses on break-bulk and petrochemicals.
- Tonghai Port Area (通海港区): it's a planned comprehensive area for foreign trade.
- Qihai Port Area (启海港区)
