= Zhenjiang South railway station =

Railway station in Zhenjiang, China

Zhenjiang South 镇江南
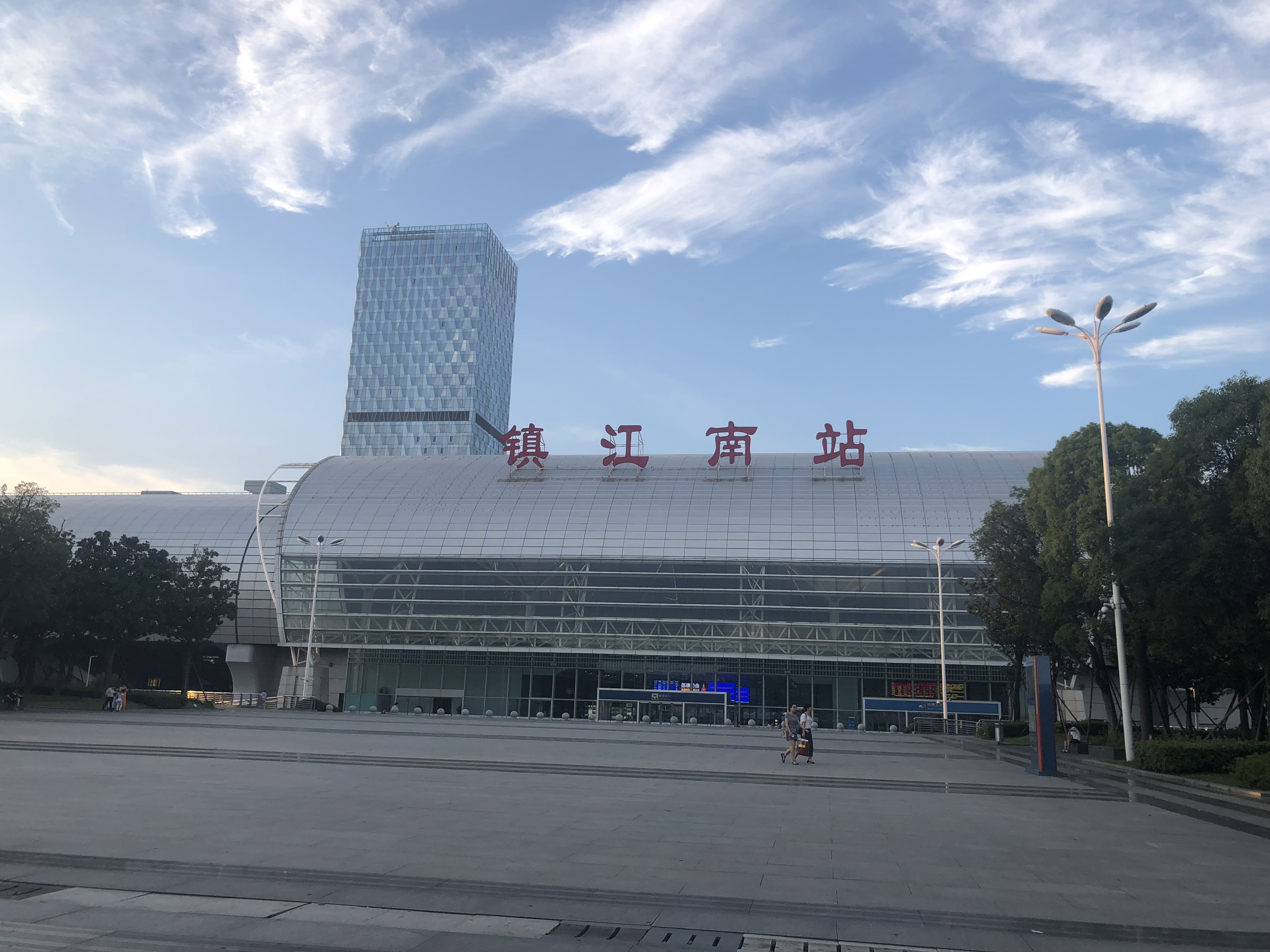
- Zhenjiang South railway station

General information
- Other names: Zhenjiang South
- Location: Dantu District, Zhenjiang, Jiangsu; China
- Coordinates: 32.15426°N 119.419316°E
- Operated by: China Railway Shanghai Group; China Railway Corporation
- Line(s): Beijing–Shanghai high-speed railway

Other information
- Station code: TMIS code: 66842; Telegraph code: ZEH; Pinyin code: ZJN
- Classification: 2nd class station

History
- Opened: June 30, 2011
Location

Zhenjiang South railway station (Chinese: 镇江南站) is a high-speed railway station in Zhenjiang, Jiangsu, People's Republic of China. It is on the Beijing–Shanghai high-speed railway.

== See also ==
Zhenjiang also has Zhenjiang railway station, on the Beijing–Shanghai railway and Shanghai–Nanjing intercity railway lines.

Preceding station	China Railway High-speed	Following station
Nanjing South towards Beijing South or Tianjin West	Beijing–Shanghai high-speed railway Part of the Shanghai–Wuhan–Chengdu passenger-dedicated railway	Danyang North towards Shanghai Hongqiao
