= Xiaoxian North railway station =

Railway station in Xiao County, China

Xiaoxian North 萧县北

General information
- Other names: Xiaoxian North
- Location: Xiao County, Suzhou, Anhui; China
- Coordinates: 34.2378°N 116.9361°E
- Operated by: CR Shanghai
- Line(s): Zhengzhou–Xuzhou high-speed railway; Huaibei–Xiaoxian railway
- Platforms: 2
- Tracks: 6

History
- Opened: 10 September 2016

Services
| Preceding station | China Railway High-speed | Following station |
|---|---|---|
| Xuzhou East Terminus | Xuzhou–Lanzhou high-speed railway | Yongcheng North towards Lanzhou West |

Xiaoxian North railway station (Chinese: 萧县北站) is a railway station of the Zhengzhou–Xuzhou High-Speed Railway in Xiao County, Anhui, China. The station will commence operation on 10 September 2016, together with the railway.
