= Huaishang, Bengbu =

Coordinates: 32°57′57.63″N 117°21′13.46″E

Huaishang 淮上区
- District
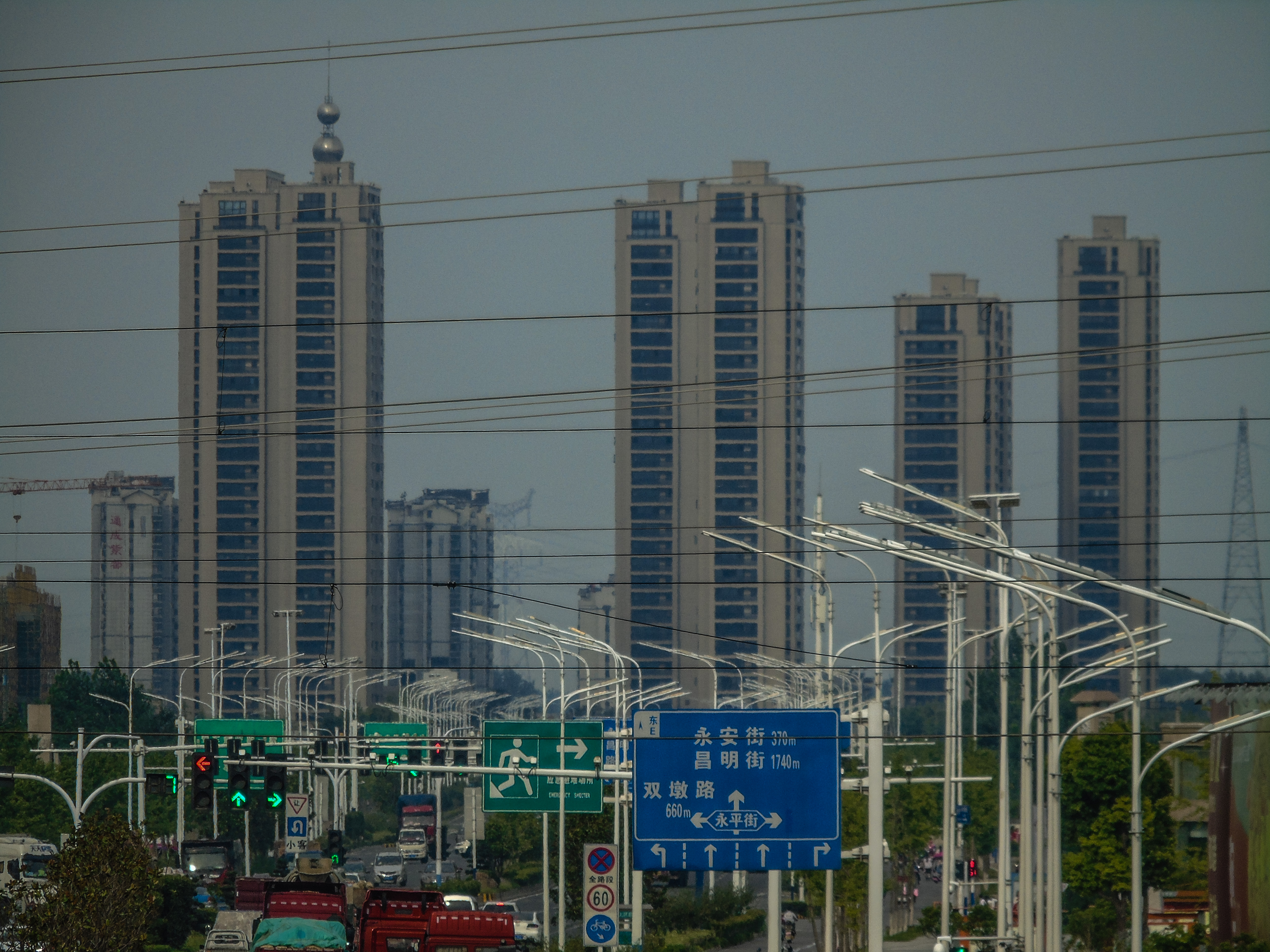
- Interactive map of Huaishang
- Country: China
- Province: Anhui
- Prefecture-level city: Bengbu
- District seat: Xiaobengbu

Area
  - Total: 412 km^{2} (159 sq mi)

Population (2020)
  - Total: 283,872
  - Density: 689/km^{2} (1,780/sq mi)
- Time zone: UTC+8 (China Standard)
- Postal code: 233002

Huaishang (Chinese: 淮上; pinyin: Huáishàng) is a district of the city of Bengbu, Anhui Province, China.

== Administrative divisions ==
In the present, Huaishang District has 1 subdistrict and 5 towns.

1 Subdistrict

- Huaibin Subdistrict (淮滨街道)

5 Towns

- Xiaobengbu (小蚌埠镇)
- Wuxiaojie (吴小街镇)
- Caolaoji (曹老集镇)
- Meiqiao (梅桥镇)
- Mohekou (沫河口镇)
