= Longzihu, Bengbu =

Longzihu 龙子湖区
- District
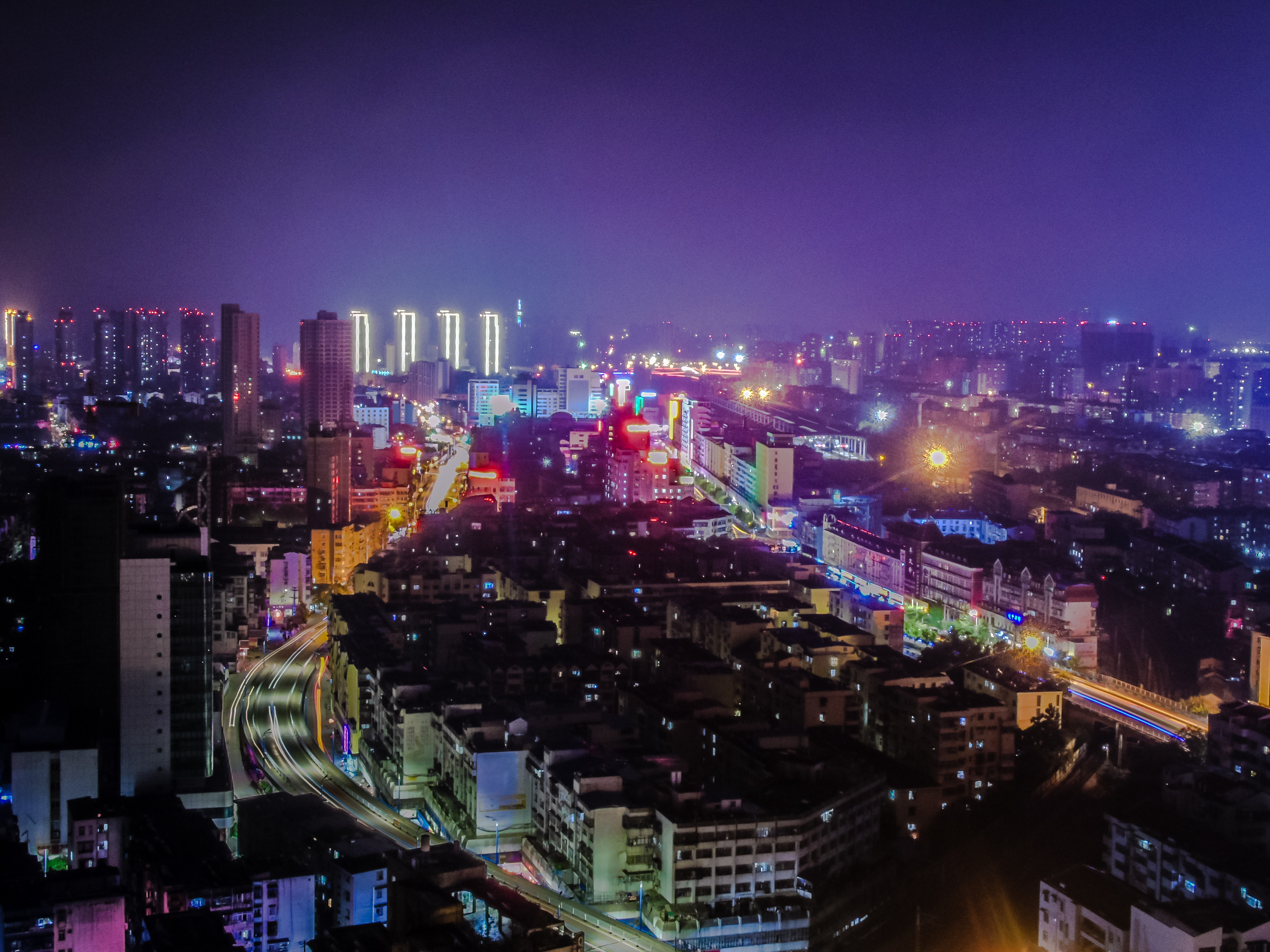
- Interactive map of Longzihu
- Coordinates: 32°56′34.67″N 117°23′15.04″E
- Country: China
- Province: Anhui
- Prefecture-level city: Bengbu

Area
  - Total: 108 km^{2} (42 sq mi)

Population (2020)
  - Total: 216,875
  - Density: 2,010/km^{2} (5,200/sq mi)
- Time zone: UTC+8 (China Standard)
- Postal code: 233000

Longzihu District (simplified Chinese: 龙子湖区; traditional Chinese: 龍子湖區; pinyin: Lóngzihú Qū) is a district of the city of Bengbu, Anhui Province, China.

== Administrative divisions ==
Longzihu District is divided to 6 subdistricts, 1 town and 1 township.

6 Subdistricts

- Zhihuai (治淮街道)
- Dongfeng (东风街道)
- Dongsheng (东升街道)
- Yan'an (延安街道)
- Caoshan (曹山街道)
- Jiefang (解放街道)

1 Town

- Changhuaiwei (长淮卫镇)

1 Township

- Lilou (李楼乡)

== Qiugang village ==
The release in 2010 of a documentary called The Warriors of Qiugang: A Chinese Village Fights Back, chronicles how the 1,876 village residents of Qiugang (仇岗) mobilized themselves to stop the local factory Jiucailuo from producing pesticides and herbicides which severely affected their living conditions.
