= Suzhou East railway station =

Railway station in Suzhou, Anhui, China

Suzhoudong 宿州东
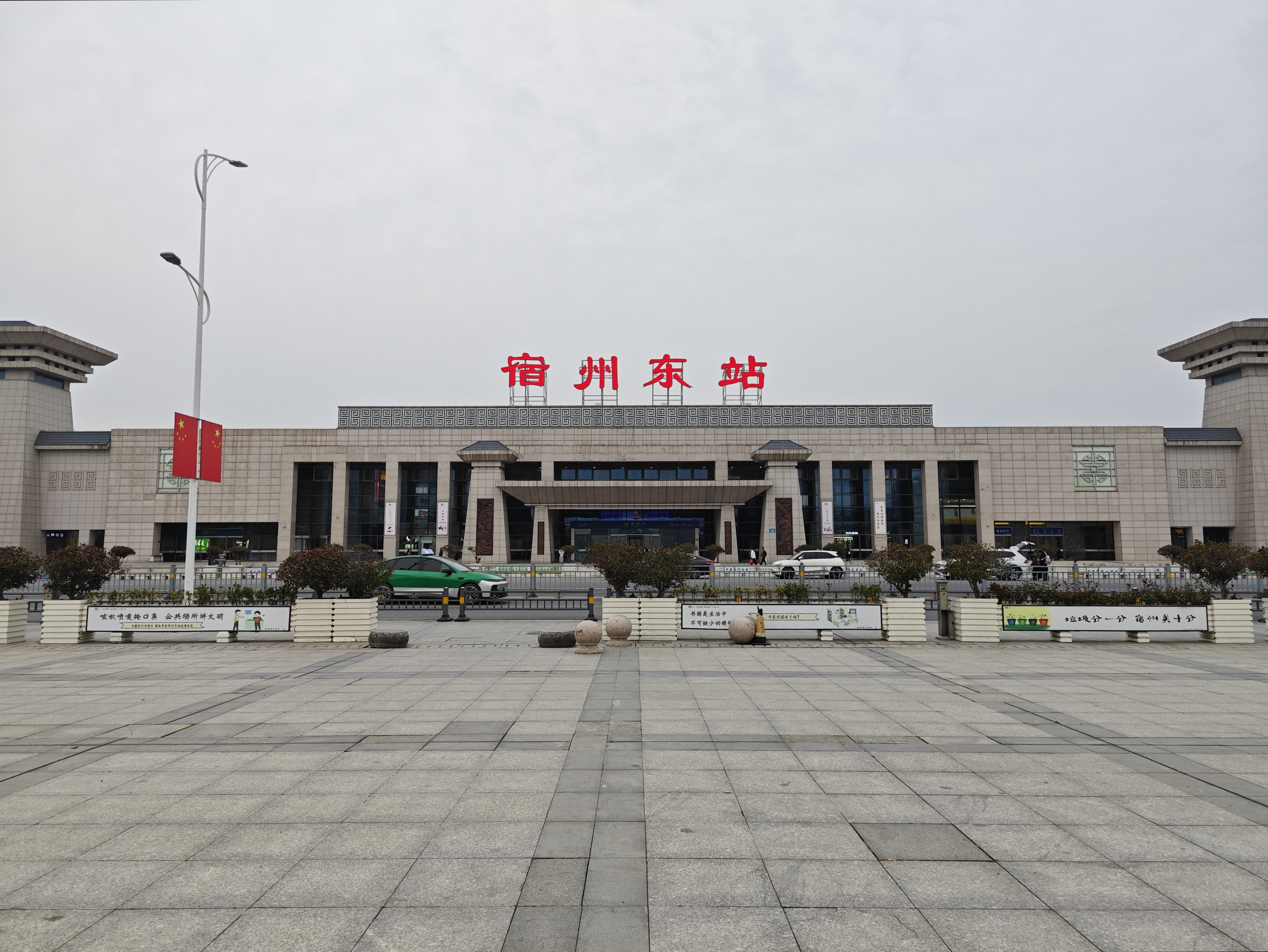
- Station Building

General information
- Other names: Suzhou East
- Location: Yongqiao District, Suzhou, Anhui, Anhui; China
- Coordinates: 33.676586°N 117.246287°E
- Operated by: Shanghai Railway Bureau; China Railway Corporation
- Line: Jinghu High-Speed Railway

History
- Opened: 2011-06-30

Services
Preceding station	China Railway High-speed	Following station
Xuzhou East towards Beijing South or Tianjin West	Beijing–Shanghai high-speed railway Part of the Beijing–Taipei High-Speed Rail Corridor	Bengbu South towards Shanghai Hongqiao
Location

The Suzhou East railway station (simplified Chinese: 宿州东站; traditional Chinese: 宿州東站; pinyin: Sùzhōudōng Zhàn) is a high-speed railway station in Suzhou, Anhui, People's Republic of China. It is served by the Jinghu High-Speed Railway.

== Station information ==
Suzhou East Station is located in the eastern suburbs of Suzhou City, Anhui Province. Suzhou City serves as the northern gateway of Anhui Province.

The station has two platforms and a total of six tracks. The station building is designed with a portico made of granite, complemented by a glass curtain wall. The total construction area of the station building is 5,000 square meters.

Suzhou East Station began construction in May 2008. The main structure was completed in May 2011, and it officially opened for operation on June 30, 2011, with the opening of the Beijing-Shanghai High-Speed Railway.

In November 2015, a renovation and expansion project for the station building was initiated, and the project was completed in December 2016.

== Miscellaneous ==
This station (or any station in Suzhou, Anhui) should not be confused with any of the railway stations in Suzhou, Jiangsu, hundreds of miles away. The "su" syllable in the names of the two cities are written with different Chinese characters (宿 vs. 苏), but are romanized identically.
