= Hefei–Bengbu high-speed railway =

Railway line in Anhui, China

Beijing–Taipei high-speed rail corridor Hefei–Bengbu section 京台高速铁路合蚌段
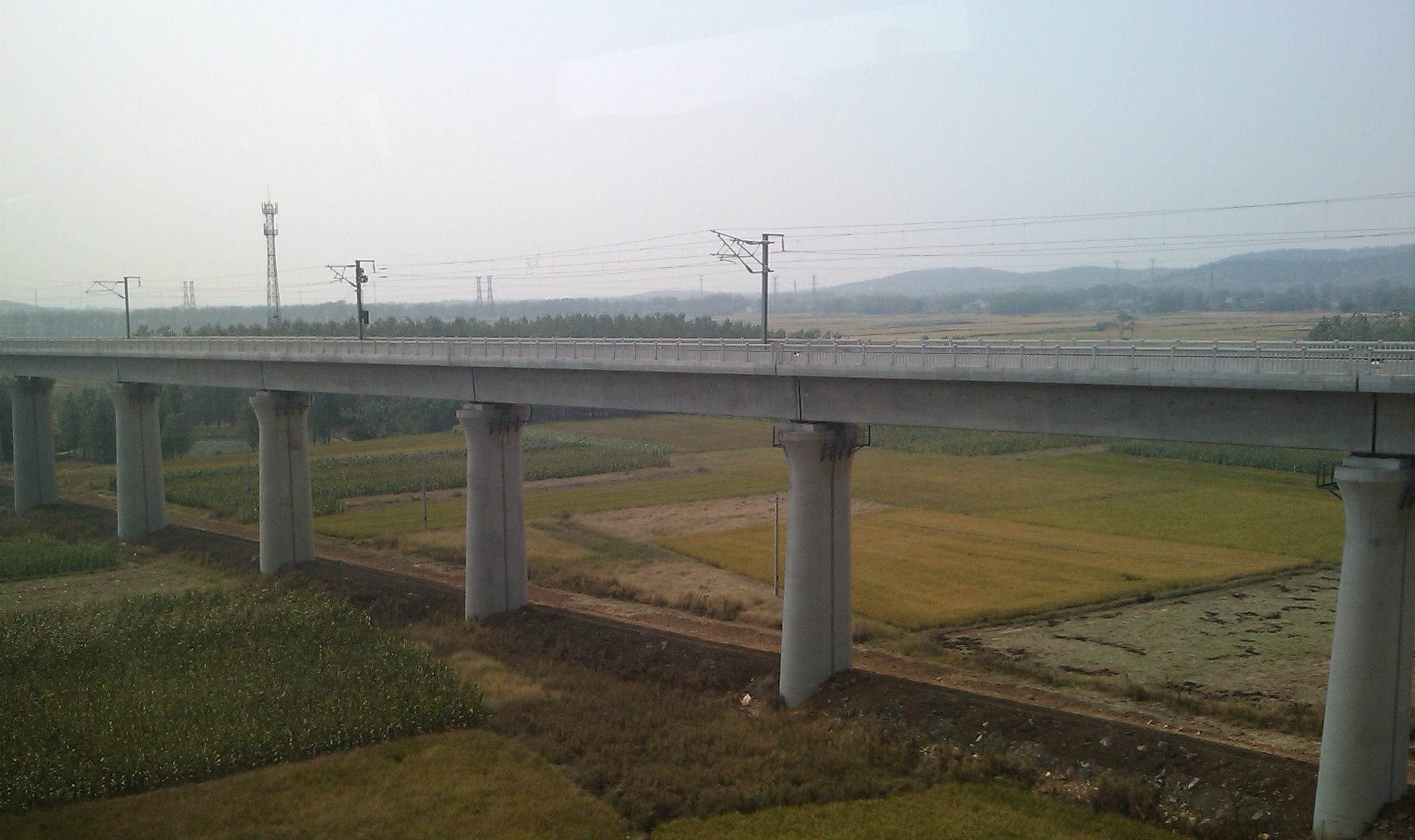
- Hefei–Bengbu high-speed railway near Bengbu South station

Overview
- Status: Operational
- Locale: Anhui
- Termini: Hefei; Bengbu South
- Stations: 9

Service
- Type: High-speed rail
- Operator(s): China Railway High-speed
- Rolling stock: CRH380A

History
- Opened: 16 October 2012

Technical
- Line length: 130 km (81 mi)
- Track gauge: 1,435 mm (4 ft 8 1/2 in) standard gauge
- Operating speed: 350 km/h (217 mph)
Route map
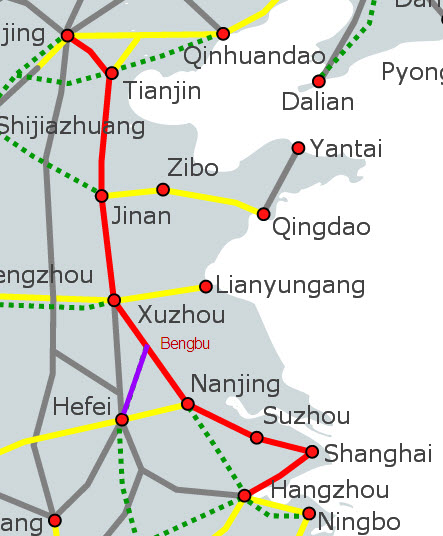

Hefei–Bengbu high-speed railway
- Simplified Chinese: 合蚌客运专线
- Traditional Chinese: 合蚌客運專線
Transcriptions
Standard Mandarin
- Hanyu Pinyin: Hé-Bèng Kèyùn Zhuānxiàn

Beijing–Taipei HSR corridor, Hefei–Bengbu section
- Simplified Chinese: 京台高速铁路合蚌段
- Traditional Chinese: 京臺高速鐵路合蚌段 or 京台高速鐵路合蚌段
Transcriptions
Standard Mandarin
- Hanyu Pinyin: Jīng-Tái gāosù tiělù Hé-Bèng duàn

Hefei–Bengbu high-speed railway (or the Hefei–Bengbu section of the Beijing–Taipei high-speed rail corridor) is a 130.67 km (81.19 mi) high-speed rail line between Hefei and Bengbu in Anhui province. It is a part of the future Jingfu line connecting Beijing and Fuzhou, Fujian.

Construction started in January 2009. The railway was opened on October 16, 2012.

With the fastest (G-series) trains on the new line, the travel time from Hefei to Beijing South railway station is only four hours. Besides the Hefei-Beijing trains, there is also direct service from Hefei to Qingdao, via Jinan and the Jiaozhou–Jinan high-speed railway.

The total estimated investment is 13.6 billion yuan. The design speed is 350 km/h (220 mph). It is part of the Jingfu line connecting Beijing and Fuzhou, Fujian.

There are 8 stations along this line.
