= Hefei railway station =

Railway station in Hefei, China

Coordinates: 31°53′07″N 117°19′06″E

Hefei 合肥
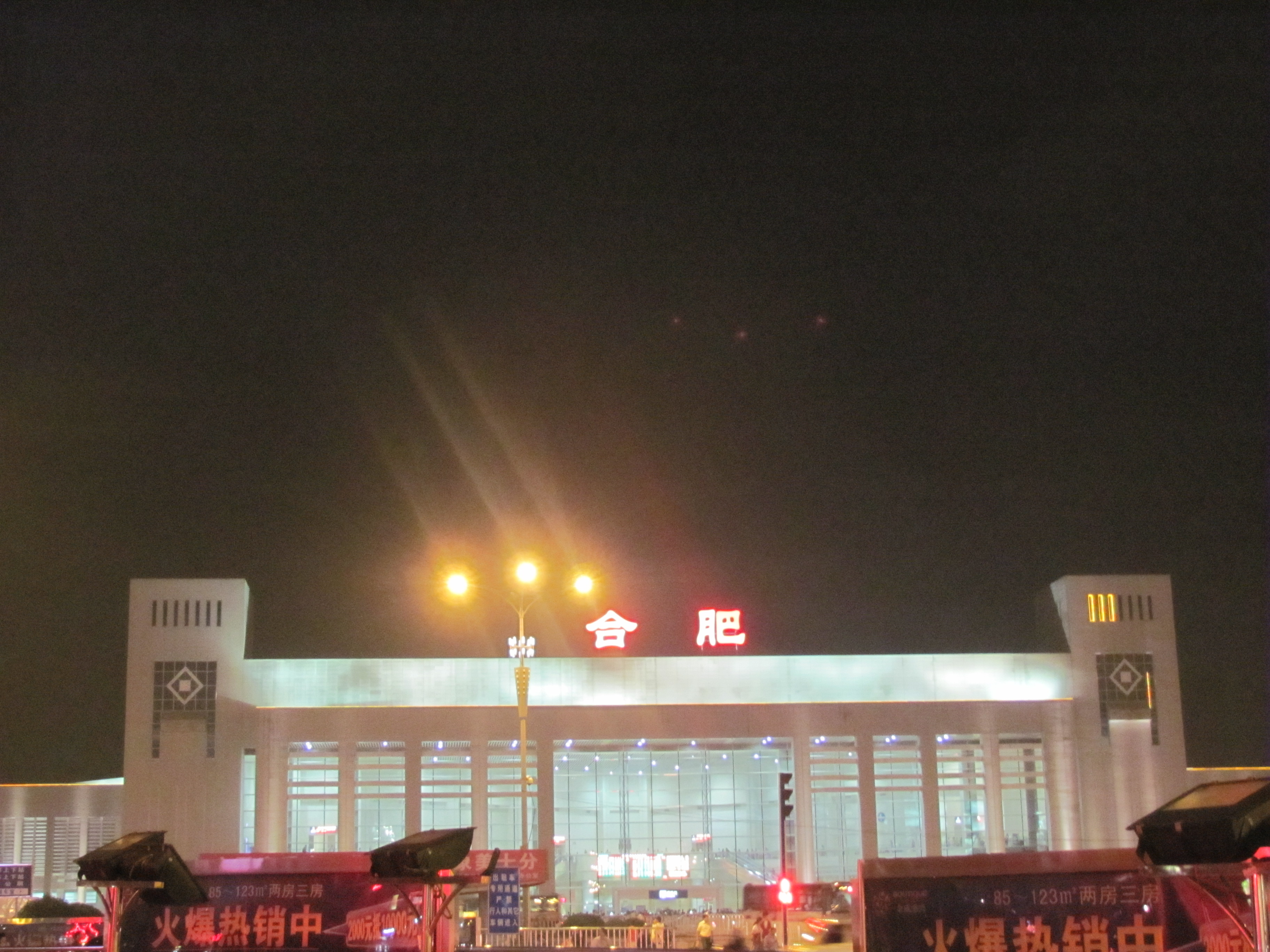

General information
- Location: Hefei Lu, Yaohai District, Hefei, Anhui; China
- Operated by: Shanghai Railway Bureau; China Railway Corporation
- Lines: Hefei–Nanjing Passenger Railway; Hefei–Bengbu High-Speed Railway; Hefei–Fuzhou High-Speed Railway; Western Union Railway; Huainan Railway; Hefei–Jiujiang railway
- Platforms: 5
- Connections: Bus terminal 1 Hefei Metro Line 1; 3 Hefei Metro Line 3

Other information
- Station code: TMIS code: 19424; Telegraph code: HFH; Pinyin code: HFE
- Classification: 1st class station

History
- Opened: 1934
Location

The Hefei railway station (Chinese: 合肥站; pinyin: Héféi Zhàn) is a major railway station in Hefei, Anhui, China.

The current station building was opened in 1997.

| Preceding station | China Railway High-speed | Following station |
|---|---|---|
| Terminus | Hefei–Bengbu high-speed railway | Hefei Beicheng towards Bengbu South |
