= Bengbu =

Bengbu 蚌埠市
- Prefecture-level city
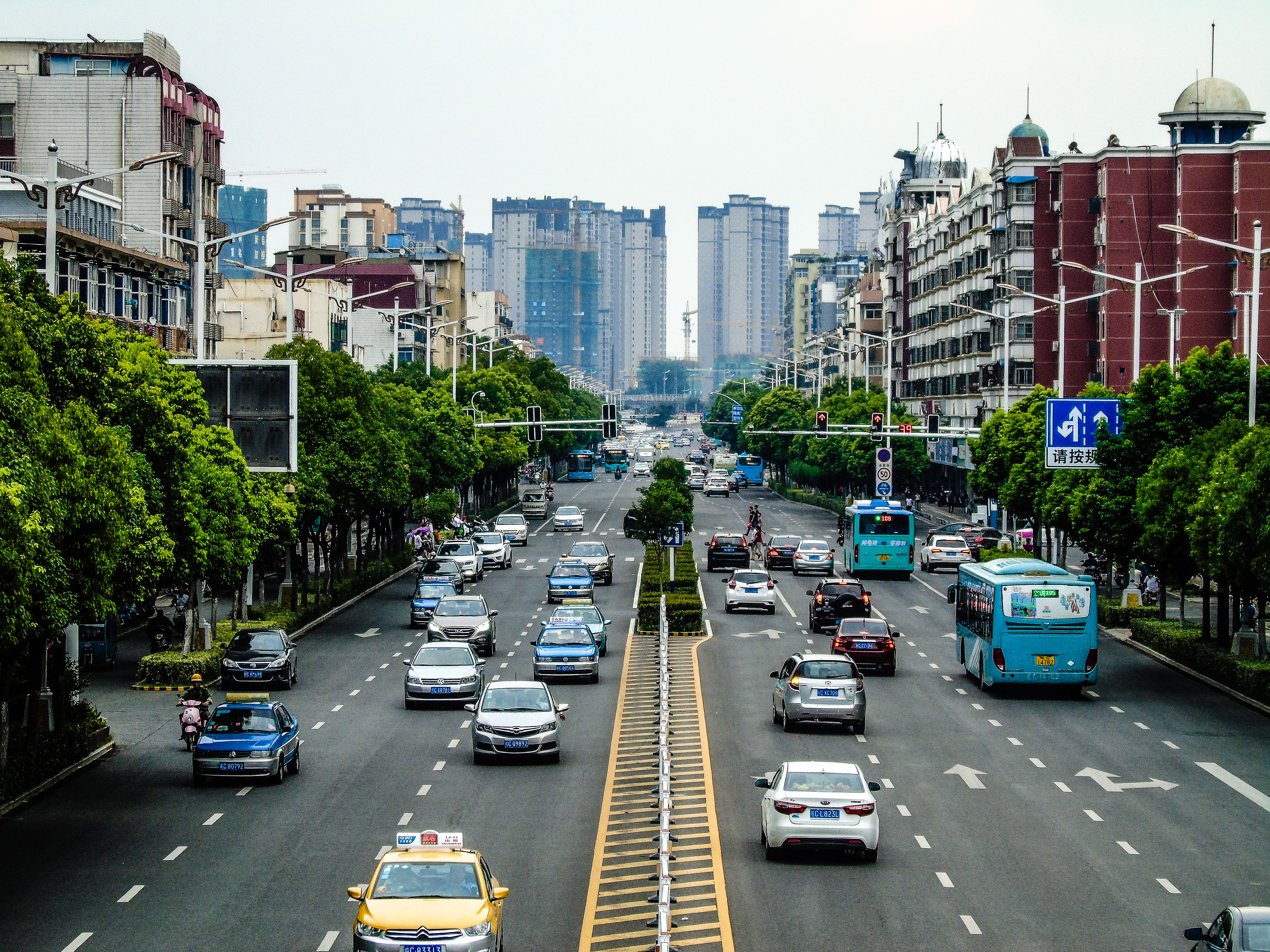
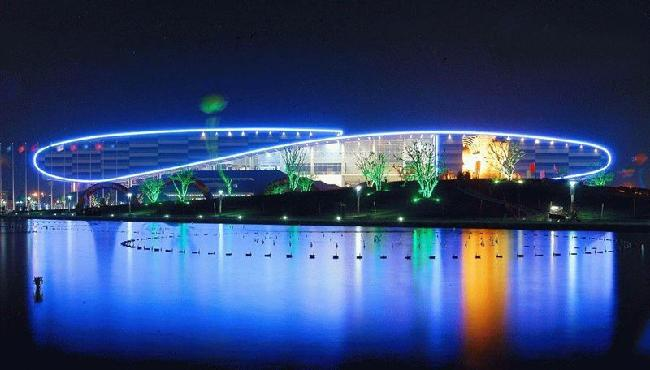
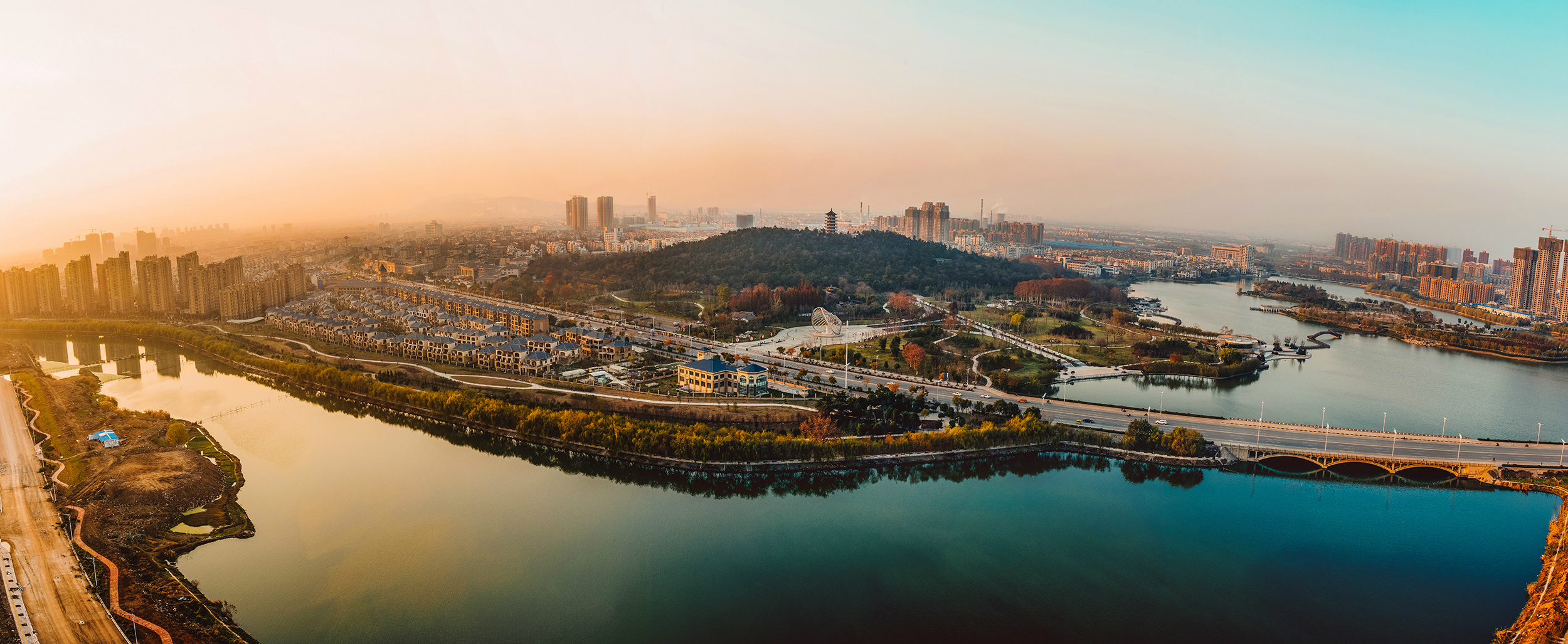
- Clockwise from top: Longzi Lake District at night, the Bengbu Convention Center, the Jingtushan Scenic Area, and Shengli road facing west.
- Nickname: Pearl city (珠城)
- Motto: 蚌埠住了 (literally: can't hold back)
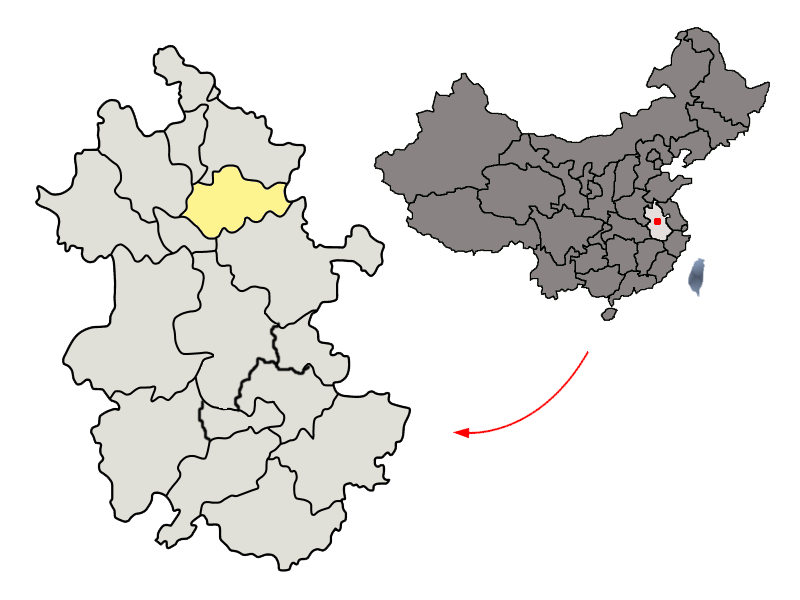
- Location of Bengbu City jurisdiction in Anhui
- Coordinates (Bengbu municipal government): 32°55′01″N 117°23′20″E
- Country: People's Republic of China
- Province: Anhui
- County-level divisions: 7
- Township-level divisions: 74
- Municipal seat: Longzihu District

Government
  - Mayor: Zhou Chunyu (周春雨)
  - Secretary of Municipal Party Committee: Chen Qitao (陈启涛)

Area
  - Prefecture-level city: 5,952.14 km^{2} (2,298.13 sq mi)
  - Urban: 613.7 km^{2} (237.0 sq mi)
  - Metro: 613.7 km^{2} (237.0 sq mi)

Population (2020 census)
  - Prefecture-level city: 3,296,408
  - Density: 553.819/km^{2} (1,434.38/sq mi)
  - Urban: 1,336,093
  - Urban density: 2,177/km^{2} (5,639/sq mi)
  - Metro: 1,968,027
  - Metro density: 3,207/km^{2} (8,306/sq mi)

GDP
  - Prefecture-level city: CN¥ 199.0 billion US$ 29.3 billion
  - Per capita: CN¥ 59,963; US$ 9,295
- Time zone: UTC+8 (CST)
- Postal code: 233000
- Area code: 0552
- ISO 3166 code: CN-AH-03
- License Plate Prefix: 皖C
- Website: www.bengbu.gov.cn

Bengbu (Chinese: 蚌埠; pinyin: Bèngbù; Wade–Giles: Peng-pu) is a city in northern Anhui Province, China. Its population was 3,296,408 registered residents at the 2020 census. 1,968,027 lived in the built-up area made of four Bengbu urban districts and Fengyang County in Chuzhou Prefecture, largely being conurbated. Its name means "Clam Wharf" in Chinese, echoing its former reputation as a freshwater pearl fishery.

== Administration ==
The prefecture-level city of Bengbu administers seven county-level divisions, including four districts and three counties.

Map
Name	Chinese	Hanyu Pinyin	Post Code
Longzihu District	龙子湖区	Lóngzǐhú Qū	233000
Bengshan District	蚌山区	Bèngshān Qū	233000
Yuhui District	禹会区	Yǔhuì Qū	233000
Huaishang District	淮上区	Huáishàng Qū	233000
Huaiyuan County	怀远县	Huáiyuǎn Xiàn	233400
Wuhe County	五河县	Wǔhé Xiàn	233300
Guzhen County	固镇县	Gùzhèn Xiàn	233700

These are further divided into 74 township-level divisions, including 36 towns, 19 townships and 19 subdistricts.

== Geography ==
Bengbu is located in the southeast of the North China Plain, on the Huai River. The built up urbanized area is divided into two parts: greater Bengbu on the south bank of the river and little Bengbu on the north bank. Dragon Lake is on the East side of the urbanized area. On the other side of the lake is the university district, containing four institutions of higher learning.

== Climate ==
The area has a four-season humid subtropical climate with strong monsoon influences (Köppen climate classification Cwa), cool, sometimes cold, winters, and hot and humid summers. The area lies in a climatic transition zone, as it is on the Qin Ling−Huai River boundary between the climatic regimes of northern and southern China. The monthly 24-hour average temperature ranges from 2.0 °C (35.6 °F) in January to 28.1 °C (82.6 °F) in July, and the annual mean is 15.76 °C (60.4 °F). A majority of the annual precipitation occurs from June to August. With monthly percent possible sunshine ranging from 44% in March to 56% in August, the city receives 2,168 hours of bright sunshine annually.

Climate data for Bengbu, elevation 27 m (89 ft), (1991–2020 normals, extremes 1951–present)
Month	Jan	Feb	Mar	Apr	May	Jun	Jul	Aug	Sep	Oct	Nov	Dec	Year
Record high °C (°F)	25.3 (77.5)	27.7 (81.9)	33.7 (92.7)	36.4 (97.5)	37.6 (99.7)	40.7 (105.3)	40.3 (104.5)	41.3 (106.3)	38.5 (101.3)	36.7 (98.1)	29.8 (85.6)	24.3 (75.7)	41.3 (106.3)
Mean daily maximum °C (°F)	6.7 (44.1)	9.8 (49.6)	15.1 (59.2)	21.8 (71.2)	27.0 (80.6)	30.4 (86.7)	32.2 (90.0)	31.3 (88.3)	27.6 (81.7)	22.6 (72.7)	15.8 (60.4)	9.1 (48.4)	20.8 (69.4)
Daily mean °C (°F)	2.1 (35.8)	4.9 (40.8)	9.9 (49.8)	16.3 (61.3)	21.7 (71.1)	25.6 (78.1)	28.1 (82.6)	27.2 (81.0)	22.9 (73.2)	17.4 (63.3)	10.6 (51.1)	4.3 (39.7)	15.9 (60.7)
Mean daily minimum °C (°F)	−1.3 (29.7)	1.1 (34.0)	5.5 (41.9)	11.4 (52.5)	16.9 (62.4)	21.5 (70.7)	24.9 (76.8)	24.1 (75.4)	19.3 (66.7)	13.2 (55.8)	6.6 (43.9)	0.6 (33.1)	12.0 (53.6)
Record low °C (°F)	−19.3 (−2.7)	−19.4 (−2.9)	−9.4 (15.1)	−1.4 (29.5)	3.7 (38.7)	12.0 (53.6)	16.8 (62.2)	15.0 (59.0)	8.7 (47.7)	−0.5 (31.1)	−7.1 (19.2)	−13.3 (8.1)	−19.4 (−2.9)
Average precipitation mm (inches)	32.2 (1.27)	36.8 (1.45)	56.3 (2.22)	54.9 (2.16)	81.3 (3.20)	160.2 (6.31)	204.5 (8.05)	155.5 (6.12)	85.8 (3.38)	49.6 (1.95)	42.8 (1.69)	25.3 (1.00)	985.2 (38.8)
Average precipitation days (≥ 0.1 mm)	6.6	7.8	8.2	7.9	8.7	9.2	12.8	12.1	8.0	6.9	7.3	6.1	101.6
Average snowy days	4.1	2.7	1.2	0	0	0	0	0	0	0	0.6	1.5	10.1
Average relative humidity (%)	72	71	68	67	68	71	79	81	76	71	71	71	72
Mean monthly sunshine hours	133.2	136.4	173.6	200.6	206.7	184.9	200.4	193.3	174.0	172.6	153.0	140.2	2,068.9
Percentage possible sunshine	42	44	47	51	48	43	46	47	47	50	49	45	47
Source: China Meteorological Administration extremes

== History ==
In ancient times, the Dongyi peoples inhabited this area and were collectively known as the Huaiyi after the Huai River. During the late Western Zhou Period and the early Spring and Autumn period, the Dongyi became increasingly sinicized. During the late Spring and Autumn period, the once-powerful Dongyi state of Xu was pressured from all directions and destroyed through a series of wars with its neighbors, such as the Chu State and the Wu State. Another Dongyi State was the small Zhongli State, which was a part of the Huaiyi Confederation led by the State of Xu. Tombs belonging to the royalty of the Zhongli State were discovered in excavations between 2005 and 2008 near Fengyang. Eventually, the Huaiyi peoples were assimilated.

Bengbu has always been a hub of water and land communications in Anhui province, and a major distribution centre for the Huai basin.

In 1948, during the Chinese Civil War, the Communist People's Liberation Army won a decisive victory over Chiang Kai-shek's Nationalist (KMT) forces near Bengbu, in the Huaihai Campaign.

== Economy ==
=== Industry ===
Bengbu is now a famous food city in Anhui province. Food-related industries account for 44% of the city's industrial production. The city's other industries include engineering works, textiles, glass making, chemicals, and electronics. The light textile holds an important position in the industrial structure. Bengbu is the only city in China that can produce a full range of glass required for the display industry. The world's thinnest 0.12 mm ultra-thin touch glass and 30-micron flexible foldable glass (UTG) used in foldable screen phones are both mass-produced here.

=== Agriculture ===
Bengbu is teeming with oil, vegetables, meat and aquatic products. Bengbu is a large producer of peanuts. The pomegranates from Huaiyuan (a county of Bengbu), have a high reputation in China. In Wuhe (a county of Bengbu), the crabs are also famous.

== Culture ==
Pollution in the village of Qiugang, a suburb of Bengbu, was the subject of the 2010 film The Warriors of Qiugang, an 83rd Academy Awards nominee. The Bengbu Stadium is located in the city. The 15,000-capacity stadium is used mostly for football matches.

== Food ==
Bengbu cuisine, along with northern Anhui cuisine, is similar to cuisine from nearby Henan and Shandong provinces, as well as Xuzhou cuisine in northern Jiangsu province.

== Transportation ==
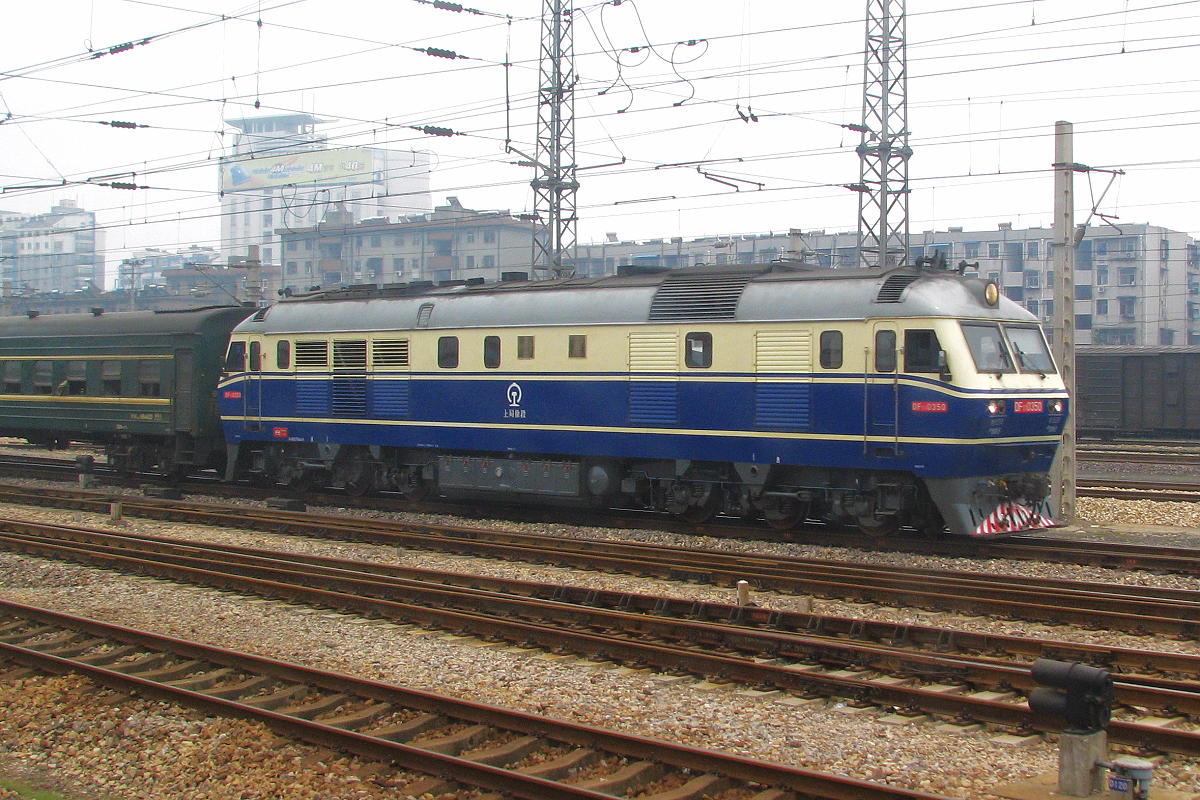
A China Railways DF11 diesel locomotive at Bengbu Railway Station

Bengbu station is on the Beijing–Shanghai railway, with hourly direct trains to Beijing, Shanghai and other large cities. Bengbu South railway station is served by the Beijing–Shanghai high-speed railway.

Bengbu Airport, which was relocated from the city's central urban area around the turn of the 21st century. A new Bengbu Tenghu Airport commenced operations from 29 April 2026 in the district north of the Huai river.

Construction on the Bengbu Rail Transit started in 2019 and was due to be completed in 2023.

== Colleges and universities ==
- Anhui University of Finance and Economics (财经大学)
- Bengbu Medical College (蚌埠医科大学)
- Bengbu College (蚌埠学院)
- Bengbu Tank College (Army)
- Thirteenth Flying Academy (Air Force)

== Notable inhabitants ==
See Category:People from Bengbu

== Twinnings ==
- Bergamo, Lombardy, Italy, since 1988
- Settsu, Osaka, Japan
- Tameside, Greater Manchester, United Kingdom
- Szolnok, Hungary
