= Bengbu South railway station =

Railway station in Bengbu, Anhui, China

Bengbunan 蚌埠南
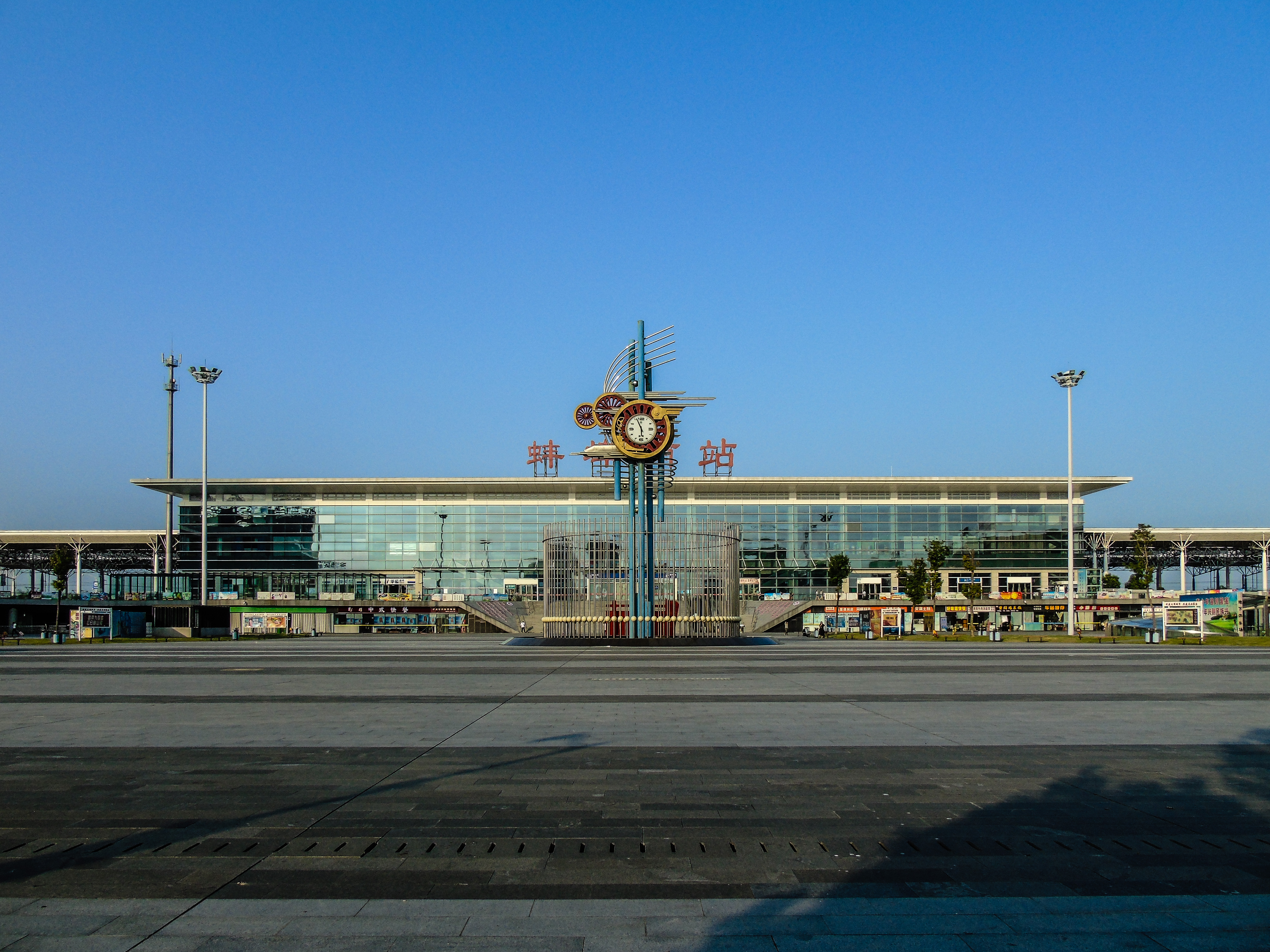

General information
- Other names: Bengbu South
- Location: Longzihu District, Bengbu, Anhui; China
- Coordinates: 33.676586°N 117.246287°E
- Operated by: Shanghai Railway Bureau; China Railway Corporation
- Line(s): Jinghu High-Speed Railway; Hebeng Passenger Railway; Huaibei–Suzhou–Bengbu intercity railway (under construction)
- Platforms: 7

Other information
- Station code: TMIS code: 66833; Telegraph code: BMH; Pinyin code: BBN
- Classification: 1st class station

History
- Opened: July 1, 2011

Services
Preceding station	China Railway High-speed	Following station
Suzhou East towards Beijing South or Tianjin West	Beijing–Shanghai high-speed railway	Dingyuan towards Shanghai Hongqiao
Liufuzhen South towards Hefei	Hefei–Bengbu high-speed railway Part of the Beijing–Taipei High-Speed Rail Corridor	Terminus

The Bengbu South railway station (Chinese: 蚌埠南站; pinyin: Bèngbù-nán zhàn) is a high-speed railway station in Bengbu, Anhui, People's Republic of China, which is served by the Jinghu High-Speed Railway.

The station is a 20,000 sq. m facility, designed by architects from the University of Southern California. Although presently the new station is located in a rather rural area outside of the city's urban core, development plans provide for a 9.27-km^{2} "high-speed railway station district" around the station.
