= Xia Jun =

Xia Jun or Jun Xia is the name of:

- Xia Jun (economist) (夏俊), better known as Jun Xia, Chinese economist
- Jun Xia (architect) (夏軍; born 1963), Chinese architect
