= Anhui =

Province in East China

Anhui 安徽 Anhwei
- Province

Name transcription(s)
  - Chinese: 安徽省 (Ānhuī shěng)
  - Abbreviation: AH / 皖 (Wǎn)
  - Lower Yangtze Mandarin: Ang1 huei1 Sen3
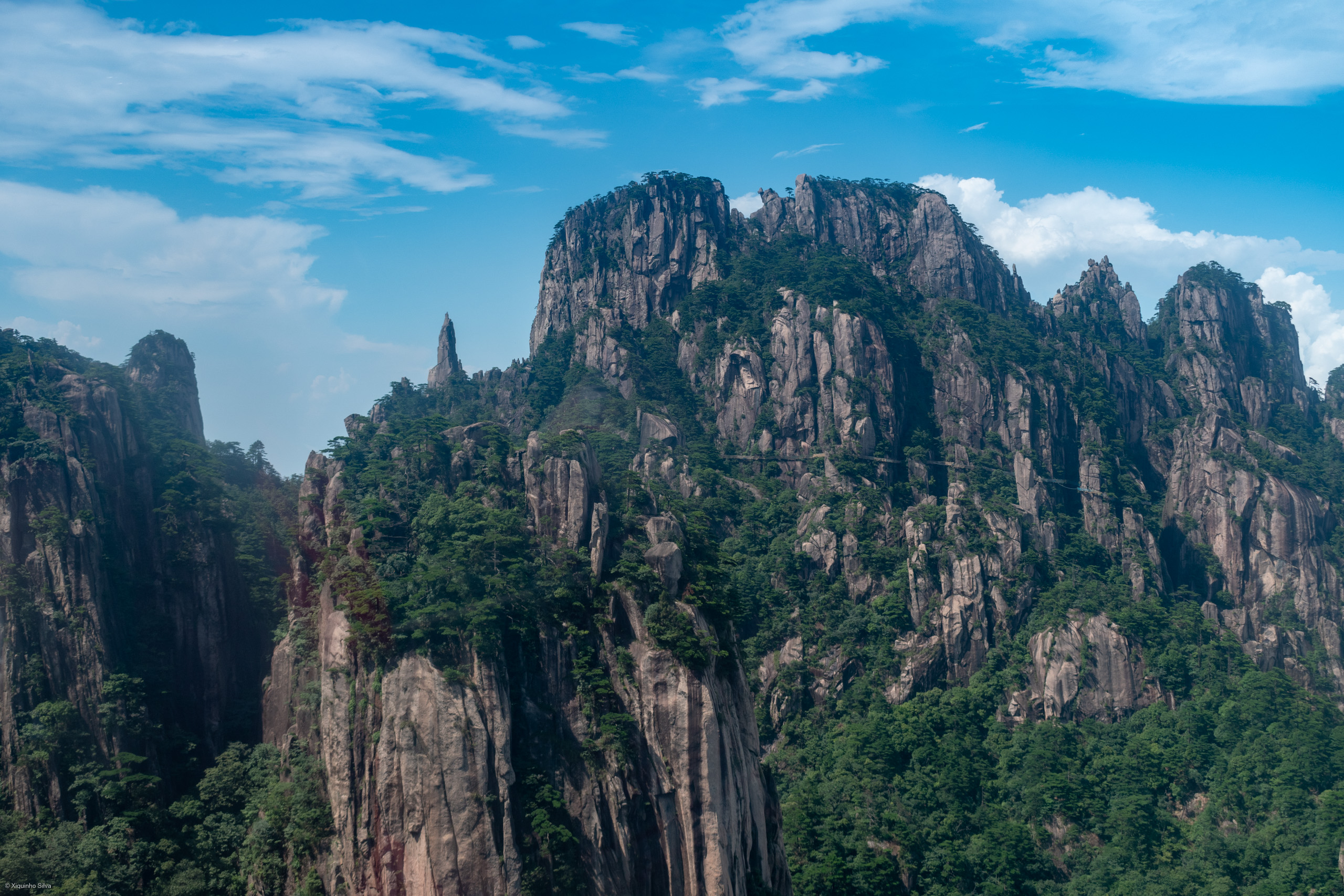
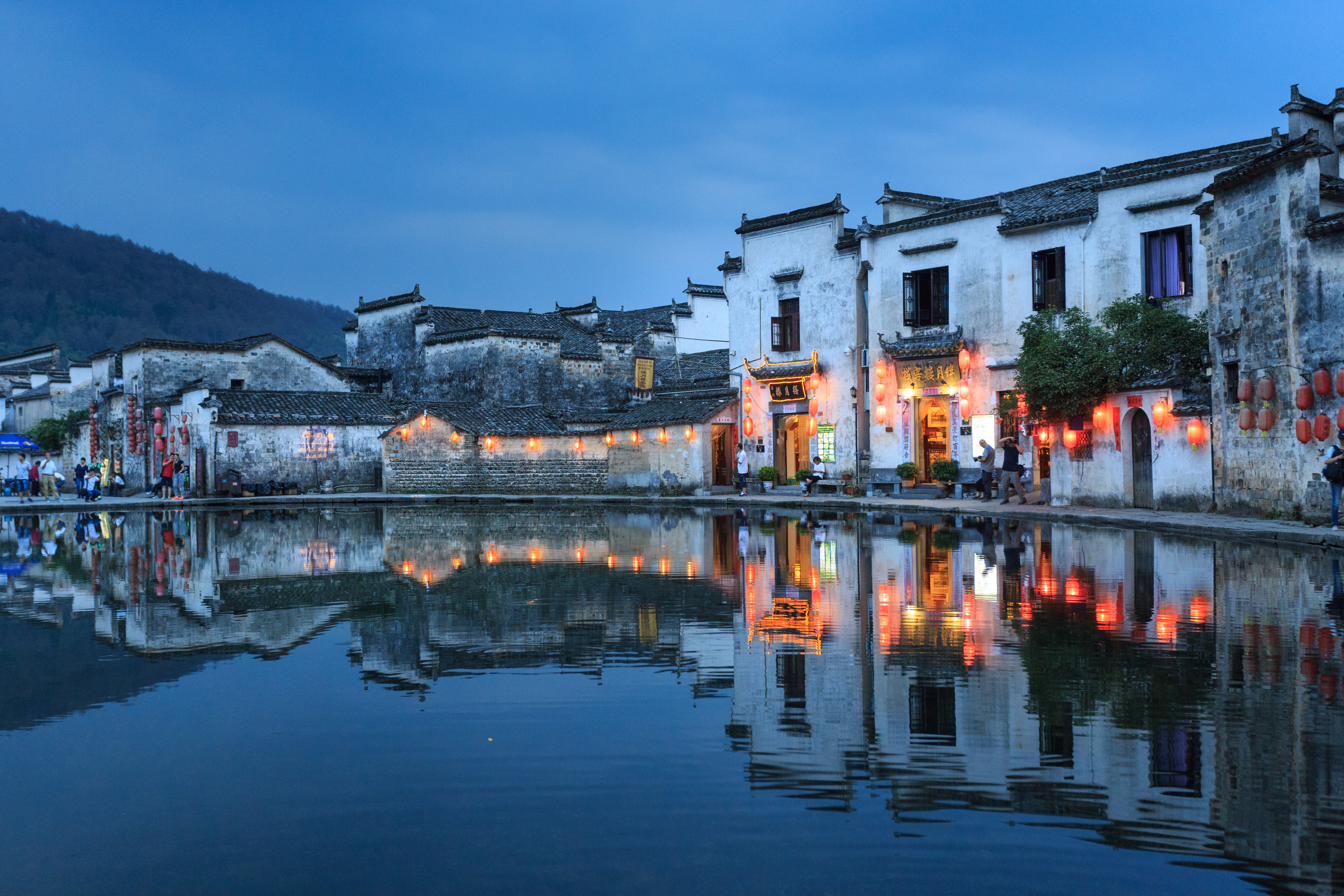
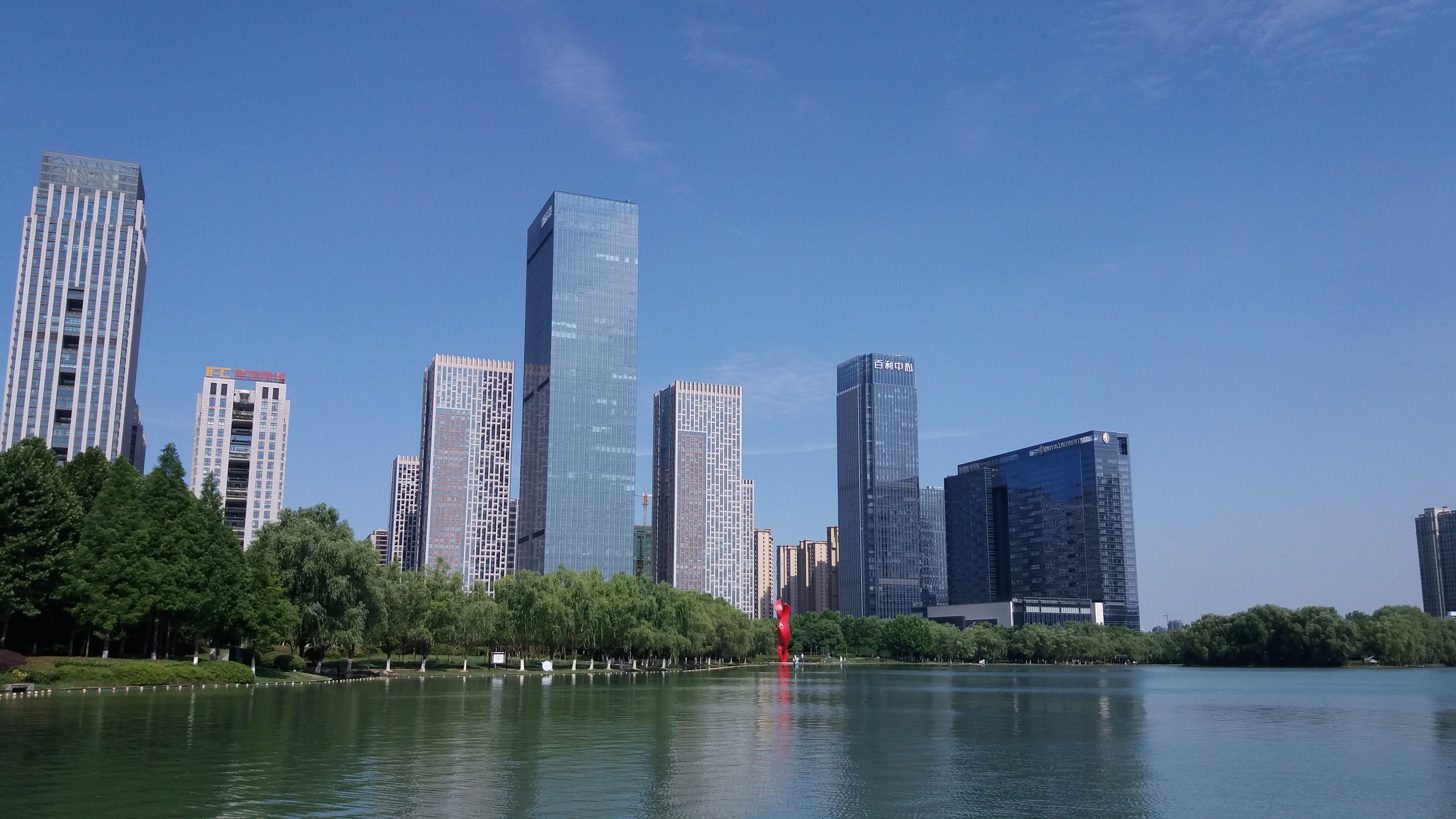
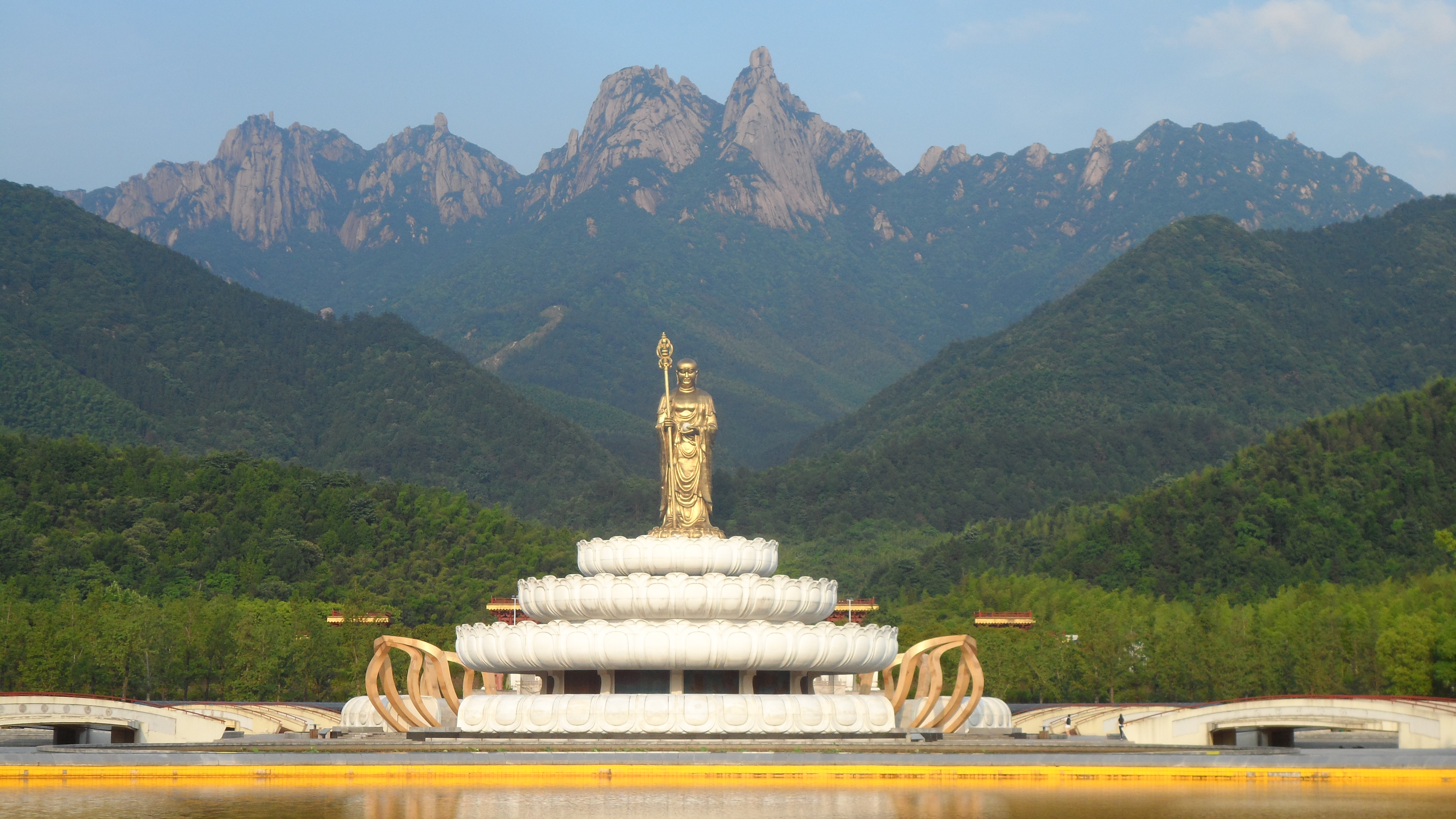
- Mount Huang Hongcun Hefei skyline Mount Jiuhua

- Map showing the location of Anhui within China
- Coordinates: 31°50′N 117°0′E
- Country: China
- Named for: Anqing and Huizhou
- Capital (and largest city): Hefei
- Divisions: 16 prefectures, 105 counties, 1845 townships

Government
  - Type: Province
  - Body: Anhui Provincial People's Congress
  - Party Secretary: Li Lecheng
  - Congress Chairperson: Li Lecheng
  - Governor: Wang Dongwei (acting)
  - Provincial CPPCC Chairperson: Zhang Ximing
  - National People's Congress Representation: 111 deputies

Area
  - Total: 140,200 km^{2} (54,100 sq mi)
  - Rank: 22nd
- Highest elevation (Lianhua Peak): 1,873 m (6,145 ft)

Population (2020)
  - Total: 61,027,171
  - Rank: 9th
  - Density: 435.3/km^{2} (1,127/sq mi)
  - Rank: 9th

Demographics
  - Ethnic composition: Han (99%); Hui (0.6%)
  - Languages and dialects: Lower Yangtze Mandarin, Central Plains Mandarin, Gan, Wu, Huizhou

GDP (2024)
  - Total: CN¥ 5,062 billion (11th); US$ 710 billion
  - Per capita: CN¥ 82,694 (13th); US$ 11,611
- ISO 3166 code: CN-AH
- HDI (2023): 0.776 (20th) – high
- Website: www.ah.gov.cn (in Chinese)

Anhui
- "Anhui" in Chinese characters
- Chinese: 安徽
- Postal: Anhwei
Transcriptions
Standard Mandarin
- Hanyu Pinyin: Ānhuī
- Bopomofo: ㄢ ㄏㄨㄟ
- Gwoyeu Romatzyh: Anhuei
- Wade–Giles: An^{1}-hui^{1}
- IPA: [án.xwéɪ]
Wu
- Romanization: Oe^{平} hue^{平}
Gan
- Romanization: Ngon^{1}-fi^{1}
Yue: Cantonese
- Yale Romanization: Ōn-fāi
- Jyutping: On1-fai1
- IPA: [ɔn˥ fɐj˥]
Southern Min
- Tâi-lô: An-huei

Anhui (Note: UK: /ænˈhweɪ/, US: /ɑːnˈhweɪ/; 安徽; formerly romanized as Anhwei) is an inland province located in East China. Its provincial capital and largest city is Hefei. The province is located across the basins of the Yangtze and Huai rivers, bordering Jiangsu and Zhejiang to the east, Jiangxi to the south, Hubei and Henan to the west, and Shandong to the north. With a population of 61 million, Anhui is the 9th most populous province in China. It is the 22nd largest Chinese province based on area, and the 12th most densely populated region of all 34 Chinese provincial regions. Anhui's population is mostly composed of Han Chinese. Languages spoken within the province include Lower Yangtze Mandarin, Wu, Hui, Gan and small portion of Central Plains Mandarin.

The name "Anhui" derives from the names of two cities: Anqing and Huizhou (now part of Huangshan City). The abbreviation for Anhui is Wǎn (皖), corresponding to the historical Wan state, and is also used to refer to the Wan River and Mount Tianzhu. The provincial government of Anhui includes a Governor, Provincial Congress, the People's Political Consultative Conference, and the Provincial Higher People's Court. Aside from managing local government departments, the Anhui provincial government manages 16 cities, 62 counties, 43 county-level districts and 1,522 townships. Anhui's total GDP ranked 14th among China's 31 province-level regions as of 2022.

== History ==
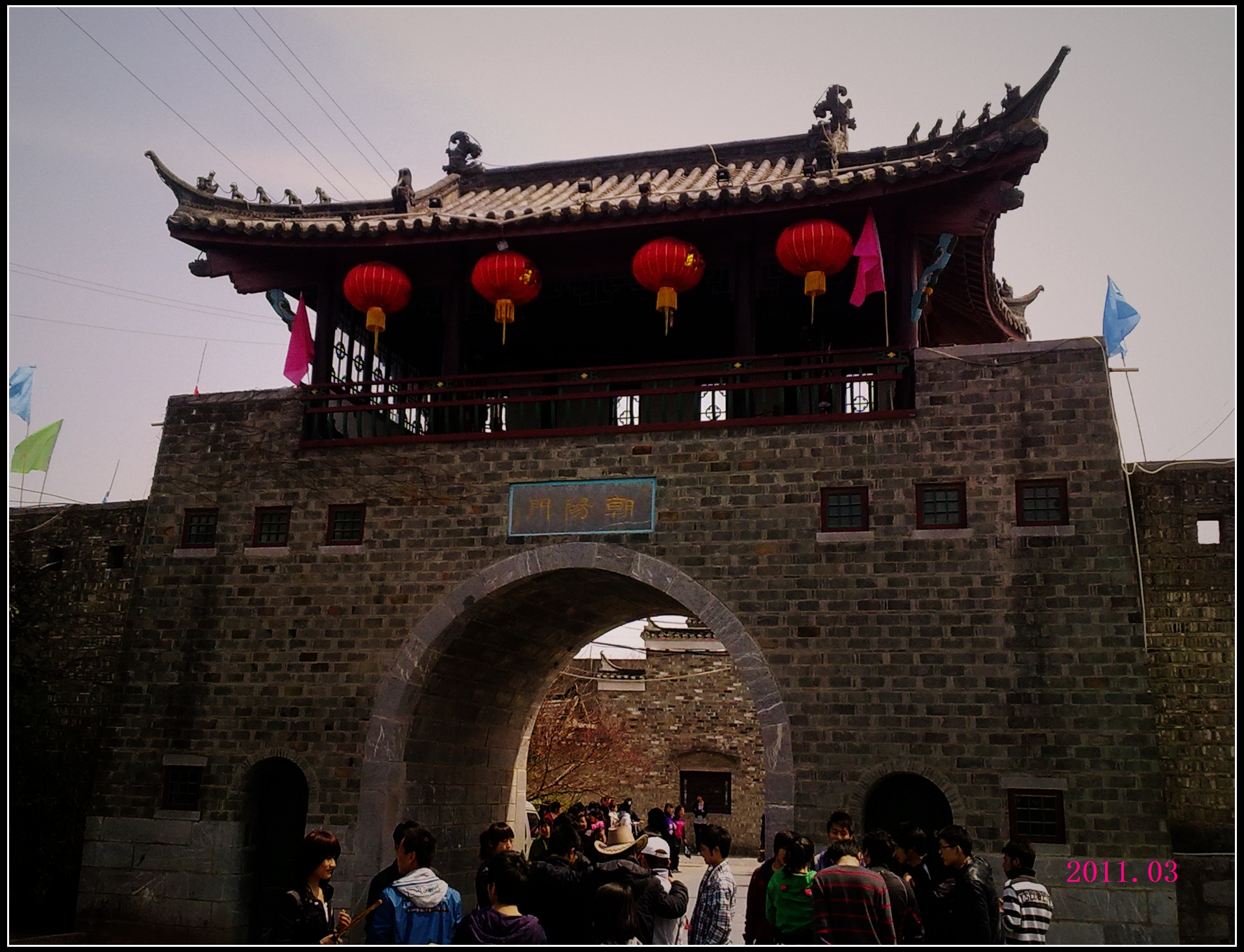
The old town of Sanhe, Feixi County

Anhui was established 1667, during the reign of the Qing dynasty's Kangxi Emperor. The province's nickname, "Wan", is taken from the name of a small state that existed in the region during the Spring and Autumn period (722–481 BC). The name "Wan" also corresponds to the province's Mount Tianzhu and Wan state. Evidence of human beings inhabiting what is now Anhui 20,000 years before present has been attested by archaeological findings in Fanchang County, related to the cultural domains of Yangshao and Longshan, dated to the Neolithic period (8000–2000 BC). In relation to these cultures, archeologists have discovered through excavation a 4500-year-old city called the Nanchengzi Ruins in Guzhen County, after they discovered a Neolithic city wall and a moat that was part of a much larger and integrated city in the region during their 2013 disinterment.

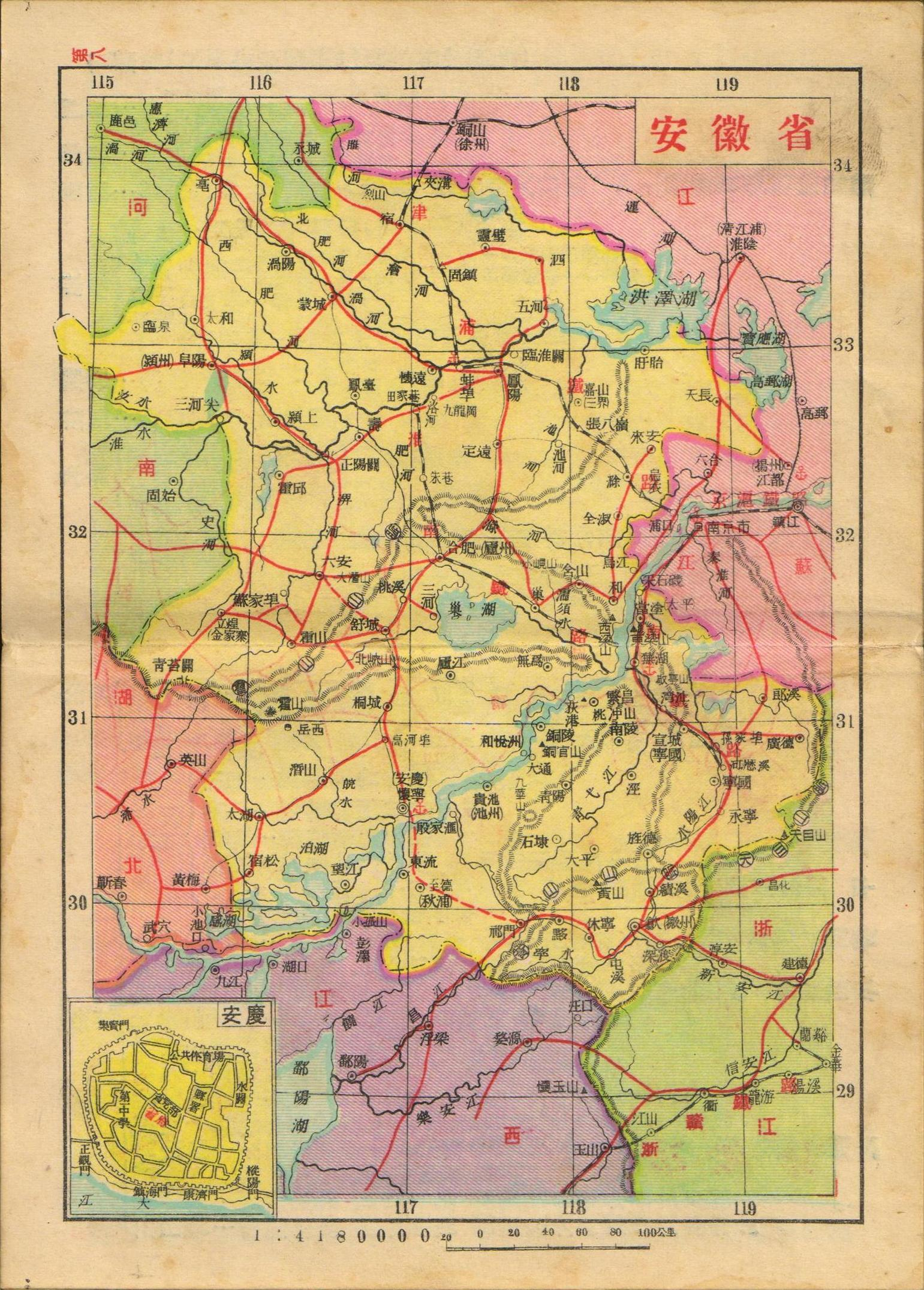
Anhui in 1936

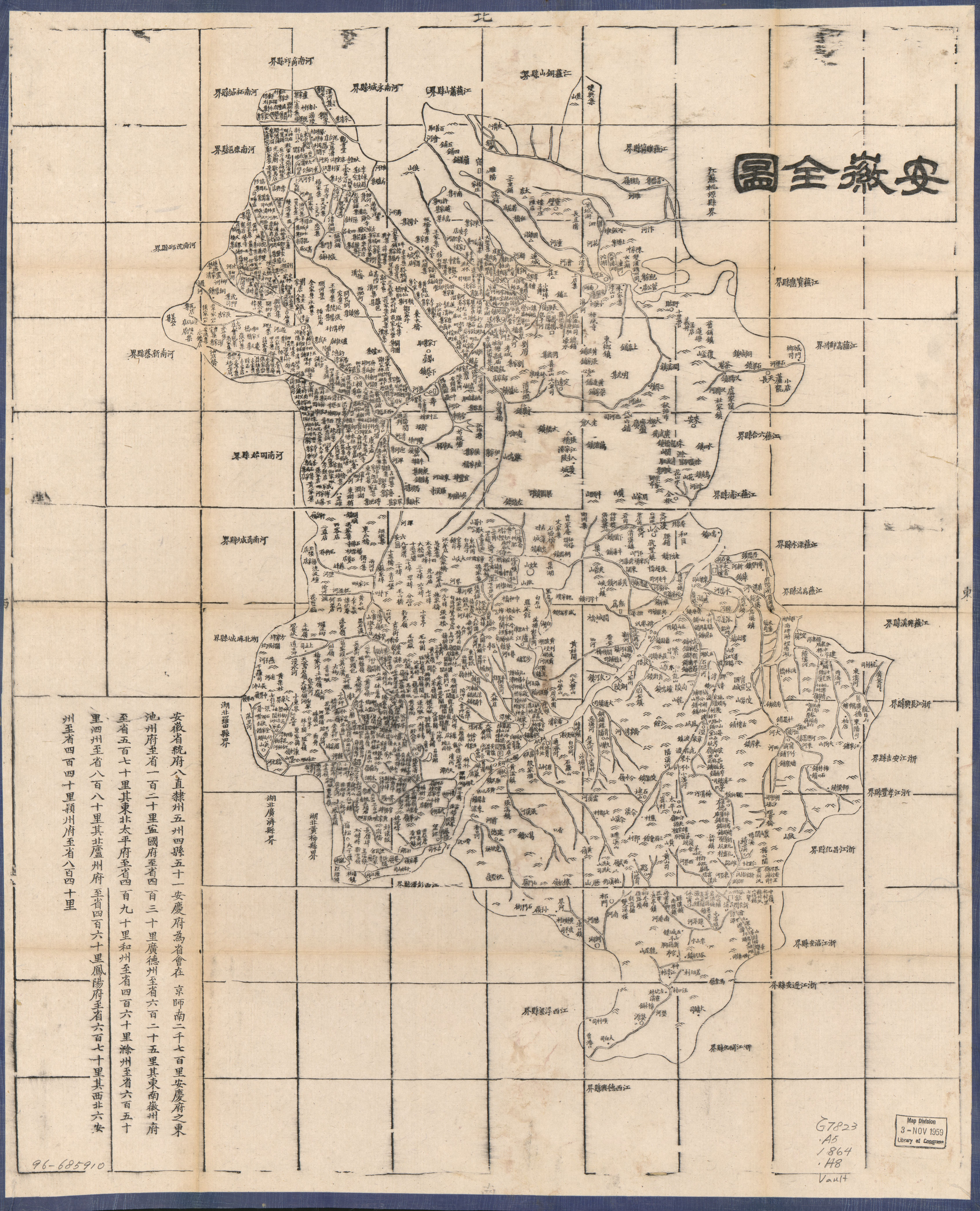
Map of the Anhui Province of the Qing Empire at c. 1:1,000,000 scale.

There are many historical sites located in the province dating to the pre-imperial period. The culture of northern Anhui was associated with that of the North China Plain, together with what is now Henan, northern Jiangsu, and southern Shandong. Central Anhui was densely populated, and consisted of the fertile Huai River watershed. Contrastingly, southern Anhui was closer to Jiangxi and southern Jiangsu; the hills in the southeastern part of the province formed a unique cultural sphere. After the Qin dynasty unified China in 221 BC, the territory of modern Anhui belonged to different prefectures, including Jiujiang, Zhang, Tang, and Sishui. The lands became part of the Yang, Yu, and Xu prefectures during the Han dynasty (202 BC – 220 AD). During the Three Kingdoms era (222–280), Anhui was dominated at various times by Eastern Wu and Cao Wei. By the Song dynasty (960–1279), the economy and culture of area was flourishing. Anhui became part of the province of Henan during the Yuan dynasty (1271–1368); during the Ming dynasty the area was directly administrated by the imperial capital in Nanjing.

Anhui and Jiangsu were merged into one province under the Qing dynasty (1644–1912) until 1666, during the reign of the Kangxi Emperor. It played an important role in the Self-Strengthening Movement led by Li Hongzhang during the later Qing. During this time, western weapons, factories and administrative theories were being introduced into China. Over the next 50 years, Anhui became one of the country's most radically liberal areas, with important 20th-century figures moving to the province, like the poet and diplomat Hu Shih, and Chen Duxiu, the founder of the Chinese Communist Party (CCP).

In 1938, large areas in north and central Anhui were severely damaged by the decision of President Chiang Kai-shek to demolish a critical dam on the Yellow River, hoping that this would physically impede the ongoing invasion by the Imperial Japanese Army and prevent them from capturing Zhengzhou. Within only ten days of the dam breaking, the water and sands drowned all of north and middle area of this province, resulting in the deaths of between 500,000 and 900,000 Chinese people, as well as an unknown number of Japanese soldiers. Following the end of the Second Sino-Japanese War in 1945, the capital city of Anhui moved to Hefei, then a small town. The provincial government made significant investments for its development. After 1949, the government launched projects to repair the damages suffered during World War II. Anhui was one of the worst affected provinces in The Great Chinese Famine. The province underwent significant development via the Third Front campaign to build basic and national defense industries in protected locations, in case of invasion by the Soviet Union or United States. The centerpiece of the Shanghai Small Third Front was the "rear base" in Anhui which served as "a multi-function manufacturing base for anti-aircraft and anti-tank weaponry". During the late 1990s Anhui became one of China's fastest-growing provinces. The province forms part of the China Yangtze River Delta Economic Area, which is the most developed area of China.

== Geography ==
Anhui is topographically diverse. The north is part of the North China Plain while the north-central areas are part of the Huai River watershed. Both regions are flat, and densely populated. The land becomes more uneven further south, with the Dabie Mountains occupying much of southwestern Anhui and a series of hills and ranges cutting through southeastern Anhui, between which is the Yangtze River. The highest peak in Anhui is Lotus Peak, part of Huangshan in southeastern Anhui. It has an altitude of 1,873 metres (6,145 feet).

Major rivers include the Huai River in the north and the Yangtze in the south. The largest lake is Lake Chaohu situated in the center of the province, with an area of about 800 km^{2} (310 sq mi). The southeastern part of the province near the Yangtze River has many lakes as well.

As with topography, the province differs in climate from north to south. The north is more temperate with more distinct seasons. January temperatures average at around −1 to 2 °C north of the Huai River, and 0 to 3 °C south of the Huai River; in July temperatures average 27 °C or above. Plum rains occur in June and July and may cause flooding.

Anhui has 16 cities. In economic terms, the top three cities are: Hefei, Wuhu and Anqing.

- Hefei
- Wuhu
- Anqing
- Huangshan City
- Tongling
- Ma'anshan
- Huainan
- Bengbu
- Bozhou

== Ecology ==
The Anhui elm, Ulmus gaussenii W. C. Cheng, is a medium size deciduous tree whose natural range is restricted to the valleys of the Langya limestone mountains of Chu Xian. The tree was most commonly found on the flood plains, indicating a tolerance of periodic inundation. U. gaussenii is now the world's rarest and most endangered elm species, with only approximately 30 trees known to survive in the wild in 2009.

The province is also home to the Chinese alligator (Alligator sinensis, simplified Chinese: 扬子鳄; traditional Chinese: 揚子鱷; pinyin: yángzǐ'è), also known as the Yangtze alligator, China alligator, or historically the muddy dragon, a critically endangered crocodilian.

== Administrative divisions ==
Anhui is divided into sixteen prefecture-level divisions: all prefecture-level cities:

Administrative divisions of Anhui
Division code	Division	Area in km^{2}	Population 2020	Seat	Divisions		
Division code	Division	Area in km^{2}	Population 2020	Seat	Districts	Counties	CL cities
340000	Anhui Province	139,600.00	61,027,171	Hefei city	45	50	9
340100	Hefei city	11,445.06	9,369,881	Shushan District	4	4	1
340200	Wuhu city	6,004.97	3,644,420	Jiujiang District	5	1	1
340300	Bengbu city	5,950.72	3,296,408	Bengshan District	4	3	
340400	Huainan city	5,532.30	3,033,528	Tianjia'an District	5	2	
340500	Ma'anshan city	4,049.13	2,159,930	Yushan District	3	3	
340600	Huaibei city	2,740.91	1,970,265	Xiangshan District	3	1	
340700	Tongling city	2,937.83	1,311,726	Tongguan District	3	1	
340800	Anqing city	13,525.03	4,165,284	Yingjiang District	3	5	2
341000	Huangshan city	9,678.39	1,330,565	Tunxi District	3	4	
341100	Chuzhou city	13,515.99	3,987,054	Langya District	2	4	2
341200	Fuyang city	10,118.17	8,200,264	Yingzhou District	3	4	1
341300	Suzhou city	9,938.77	5,324,476	Yongqiao District	1	4	
341500	Lu'an city	15,450.82	4,393,699	Jin'an District	3	4	
341600	Bozhou city	8,521.23	4,996,844	Qiaocheng District	1	3	
341700	Chizhou city	8,364.81	1,342,764	Guichi District	1	3	
341800	Xuancheng city	12,312.55	2,500,063	Xuanzhou District	1	4	2

Administrative divisions in Chinese and varieties of romanizations
English	Chinese	Pinyin	Jiang–Huai (Langjin Pinin)
Anhui Province	安徽省	Ānhuī Shěng	Ang1 huei1 Sen3
Hefei city	合肥市	Héféi Shì	Ho5 fei2 Shr4
Wuhu city	芜湖市	Wúhú Shì	U2 hu2 Shr4
Bengbu city	蚌埠市	Bèngbù Shì	Bang4 bu4 Shr4
Huainan city	淮南市	Huáinán Shì	Huä2 lang2 Shr4
Ma'anshan city	马鞍山市	Mǎ'ānshān Shì	Ma3 ang1 shang1 Shr4
Huaibei city	淮北市	Huáiběi Shì	Huä2 bä5 Shr4
Tongling city	铜陵市	Tónglíng Shì	Tong2 lin2 Shr4
Anqing city	安庆市	Ānqìng Shì	Ang1 qin4 Shr4
Huangshan city	黄山市	Huángshān Shì	Huang2 shang1 Shr4
Chuzhou city	滁州市	Chúzhōu Shì	Chu2 zhou1 Shr4
Fuyang city	阜阳市	Fùyáng Shì	Fu4 iang2 Shr4
Suzhou city	宿州市	Sùzhōu Shì	Su5 zhou1 Shr4
Lu'an city	六安市	Lù'ān Shì	Lu5 ang1 Shr4
Bozhou city	亳州市	Bózhōu Shì	Bo5 zhou1 Shr4
Chizhou city	池州市	Chízhōu Shì	Chr2 zhou1 Shr4
Xuancheng city	宣城市	Xuānchéng Shì	Süän1 chen2 Shr4

These 16 prefecture-level cities are in turn subdivided into 104 county-level divisions (45 districts, 9 county-level cities, and 50 counties). Those are in turn divided into 1,512 township-level divisions (997 towns, 230 townships, 9 ethnic townships, and 276 subdistricts).

Population by urban areas of prefecture & county cities
#	City	Urban area	District area	City proper	Census date
1	Hefei (Note: Chaohu PLC is currently no longer exist after census it was split among Hefei (Juchao & Lujiang), Wuhu (Wuwei), & Ma'anshan (Hexian & Hanshan); Juchao District is currently known as Chaohu CLC. Chaohu PLC city proper count is reflected among the three PLCs.)	3,098,727	3,310,268	7,457,027	2010-11-01
2	Huainan (Note: Shouxian County was transferred from Lu'an PLC to Huainan PLC's jurisdiction after census; the City proper count is reflected onto Huainan PLC not Lu'an PLC.)	1,238,488	1,666,826	3,342,012	2010-11-01
3	Wuhu	1,108,087	2,487,111	2,263,123	2010-11-01
4	Huaibei	854,696	1,113,321	2,114,276	2010-11-01
5	Bengbu	793,866	972,784	3,164,467	2010-11-01
6	Fuyang	780,522	1,768,947	7,599,913	2010-11-01
7	Suzhou	742,685	1,647,642	5,352,924	2010-11-01
8	Lu'an (Note: New district established after census: Yeji by splitting from parts of Huoqiu County. The new district not included in the urban area & district area count of the pre-expanded city.)	661,217	1,644,344	4,603,585	2010-11-01
(8)	Lu'an (new district)	134,239	134,239	see Lu'an	2010-11-01
9	Ma'anshan (Note: New district established after census: Bowang by splitting from parts of Dangtu County. The new district not included in the urban area & district area count of the pre-expanded city.)	657,847	741,531	2,304,774	2010-11-01
(9)	Ma'anshan (new district)	169,888	169,888	see Ma'anshan	2010-11-01
10	Anqing (Note: Zongyang County was transferred from Anqing PLC to Tongling PLC's jurisdiction after census; the City proper count is reflected onto Tongling PLC not Anqing PLC.)	570,538	780,514	4,472,667	2010-11-01
11	Bozhou	474,318	1,409,436	4,850,657	2010-11-01
12	Tongling	438,981	474,363	1,562,670	2010-11-01
(13)	Chaohu	404,789	780,711	see Hefei	2010-11-01
14	Chuzhou	392,461	562,321	3,937,868	2010-11-01
15	Tianchang	324,625	602,840	see Chuzhou	2010-11-01
16	Xuancheng	315,058	772,490	2,532,938	2010-11-01
17	Chizhou	289,122	595,268	1,402,518	2010-11-01
18	Huangshan	287,576	460,786	1,358,980	2010-11-01
19	Tongcheng	269,346	664,455	see Anqing	2010-11-01
20	Ningguo	231,090	376,857	see Xuancheng	2010-11-01
21	Jieshou	214,776	561,956	see Fuyang	2010-11-01
22	Mingguang	204,323	532,732	see Chuzhou	2010-11-01
(23)	Qianshan (Note: Qianshan County is currently known as Qianshan CLC after census.)	165,779	500,292	see Anqing	2010-11-01

Most populous cities in Anhui Source: China Urban Construction Statistical Yearbook 2018 Urban Population and Urban Temporary Population
Rank		Pop.	Rank		Pop.
1	Hefei	4,292,400	11	Tongling	535,300
2	Wuhu	1,536,700	12	Chuzhou	507,600
3	Huainan	1,178,200	13	Huangshan	406,100
4	Bengbu	961,100	14	Bozhou	365,000
5	Fuyang	907,400	15	Xuancheng	357,700
6	Huaibei	762,500	16	Chaohu	357,000
7	Ma'anshan	752,500	17	Chizhou	310,100
8	Anqing	631,500	18	Tianchang	196,600
9	Lu'an	607,500	19	Jieshou	188,600
10	Suzhou	578,600	20	Mingguang	186,000

== Politics ==
The Politics of Anhui Province is structured in a dual party-government system like all other governing institutions in mainland China. The Governor of Anhui is the highest-ranking official in the Anhui Provincial People's Government. However, in the province's dual party-government governing system, the Governor has less power than the Anhui Chinese Communist Party Provincial Committee Secretary.

Most provincial government departments and the Governor office are located at No.1 Zhongshan Road, moved from old downtown of Hefei since 2016. Provincial government is responsible to manage 16 prefecture-level cities, 105 counties, 1845 townships and different departments in Anhui. The Anhui Provincial People's Congress is just located near provincial government. The Provincial Chinese People's Political Consultative Conference (CPPCC) is located at No.317, Suzhou Road. The Provincial Higher People's Court is located at no. 472 Changjiang Rd.

Typically, annual provincial congress meeting is held in the first quarter of each year shortly before national congress meeting and the annual meeting of CPPCC is held in the first quarter or the fourth quarter of each year.

== Economy ==
Agriculture in Anhui varies according to the climate zones. To the north of the Huai River, wheat and sweet potatoes are grown, while to the south it is rice and wheat instead. As of 2022, Anhui's nominal GDP was US$670 billion (CN¥ 4.51 trilion), about 3.72% of the country's GDP and ranked 10th among province-level administrative units; the province's primary, secondary and tertiary industries were worth CN¥351.37 billion (US$52.24 billion), CN¥1.8588 trillion (US$276.36 billion) and CN¥2.29433 trillion (US$341.1 billion) respectively. Its nominal GDP per capita was US$10,943 (CN¥73,603) and ranked the 14th in the country.

Natural resources of Anhui include iron in Ma'anshan, coal in Huainan, and copper in Tongling. There are industries related to these natural resources (e.g. steel industry at Ma'anshan). One of the famous Anhui-based corporations is the automobile company Chery, which is based in Wuhu.

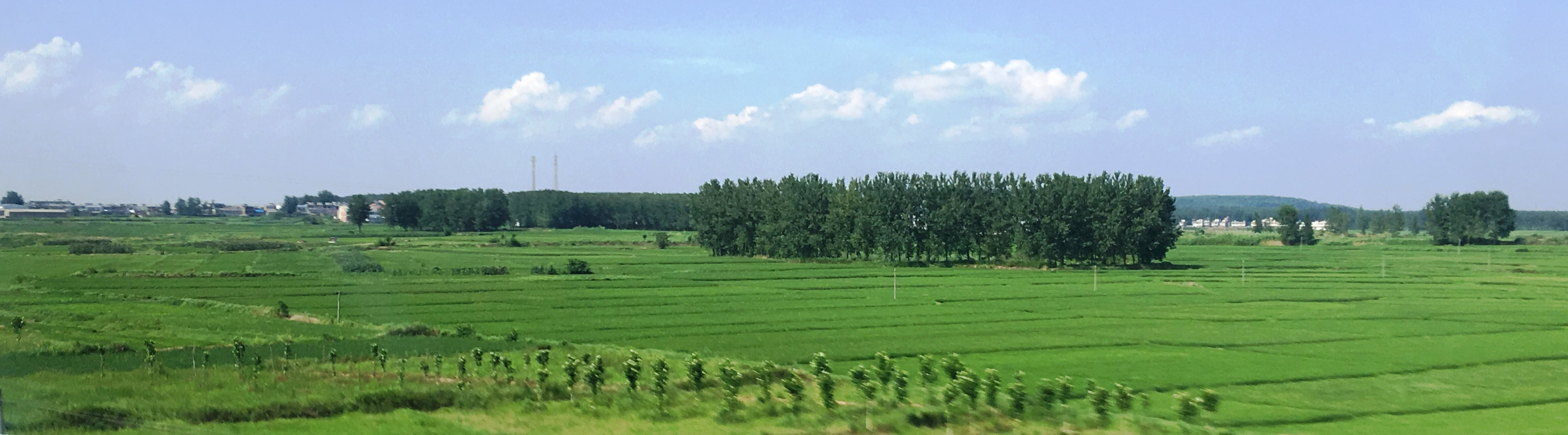
Farmlands of Anhui

Compared to its more prosperous neighbours to the east, Zhejiang and Jiangsu, Anhui has lagged markedly behind in economic development, with a GDP per capita around half of those two provinces in 2017 rapidly improved from 1/3 of those two provinces in 2010. However, the provincial GDP per capita is based on the population registered in the province (that is, with local Hukou), but not necessarily residing there. There is significant regional disparity, where much of the wealth is concentrated in industrial regions close to the Yangtze River, such as Hefei, Wuhu, and Ma'anshan. The province is home to a large cluster of white goods manufacture such as Haier, Hisense, Whirlpool, Gree, Royalstar, and Meling.

=== Major economic and technological development zones ===
==== Hefei Economic and Technological Development Zone ====
Hefei Economic and Technological Development Zone is located in the southwest of Hefei and was established in 1993. It is located close to Hefei Luogang International Airport.

==== Hefei Hi-Tech Industrial Development Zone ====
Hefei Hi-Tech Industrial Development Zone was founded in October 1990 and approved by the State Council as a state-level Development Zone in March 1991. In 1997, the Development Zone was ratified as an APEC Science and Technology Industrial Park, with special open policies to APEC and EU members. Hefei High Tech Park was also approved as a National High Tech Export Base in 2000 and obtained the award of an Advanced High Tech Zone under the Torch Program in 2003. So far, more than 100 hi-tech enterprises have entered the zone. Industries encouraged in the zone include chemical production and processing, electronics assembly & manufacturing, instruments & industrial equipment, medical Equipment and telecommunications.

==== Wuhu Economic and Technological Development Zone ====
Established in 1993, Wuhu Economic and Technological Development Zone was the first state-level development zone approved by central government in Anhui, utilising the transportation advantage of the Yangtse Delta at Wuhu.

==== Wuhu Export Processing Zone ====
Wuhu Export Processing Zone was approved to be a national level export processing zone, with a total planned area of 2.95 km^{2} (1.14 sq mi).

== Transportation ==
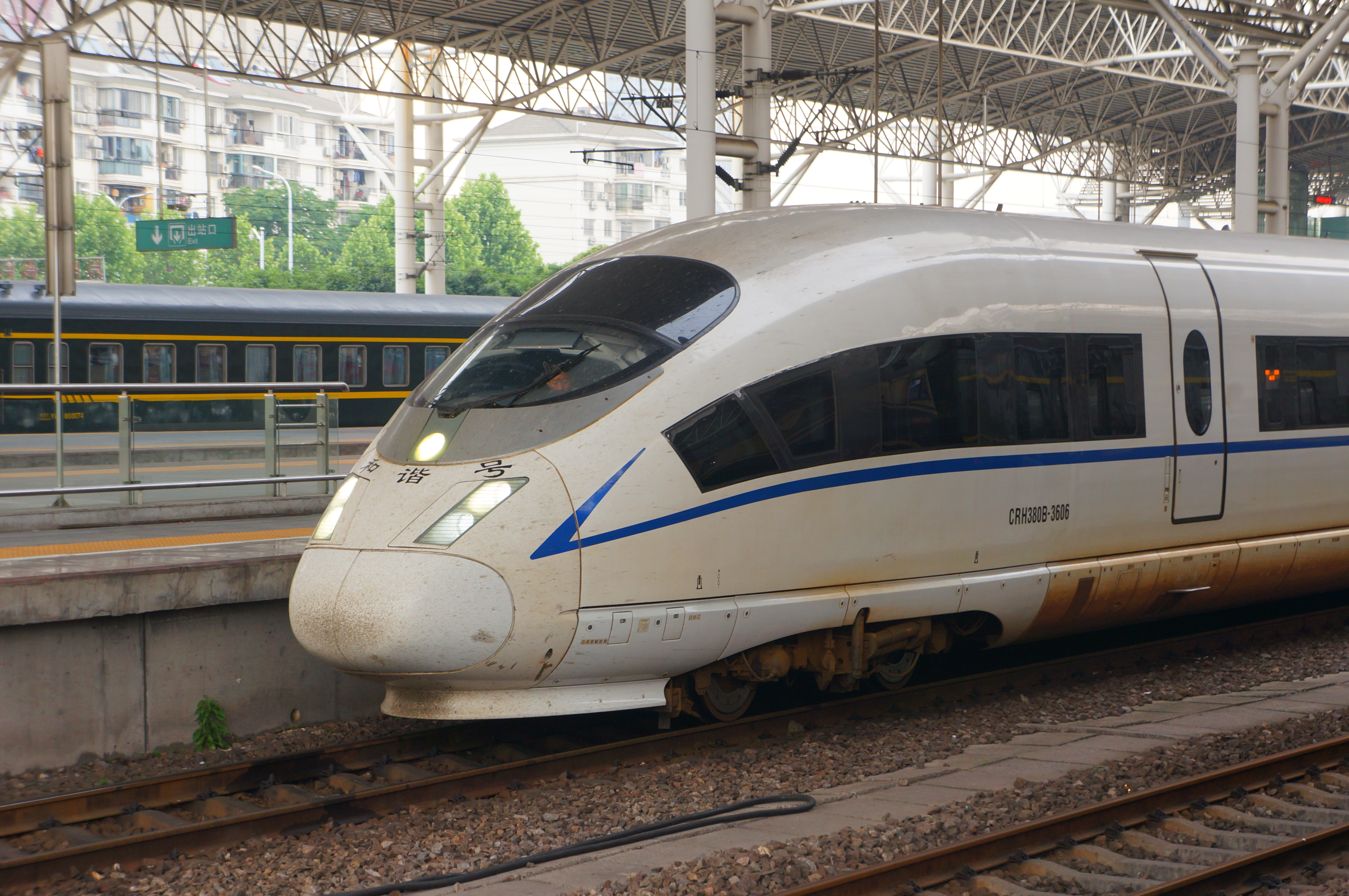
A high-speed train in Hefei railway station

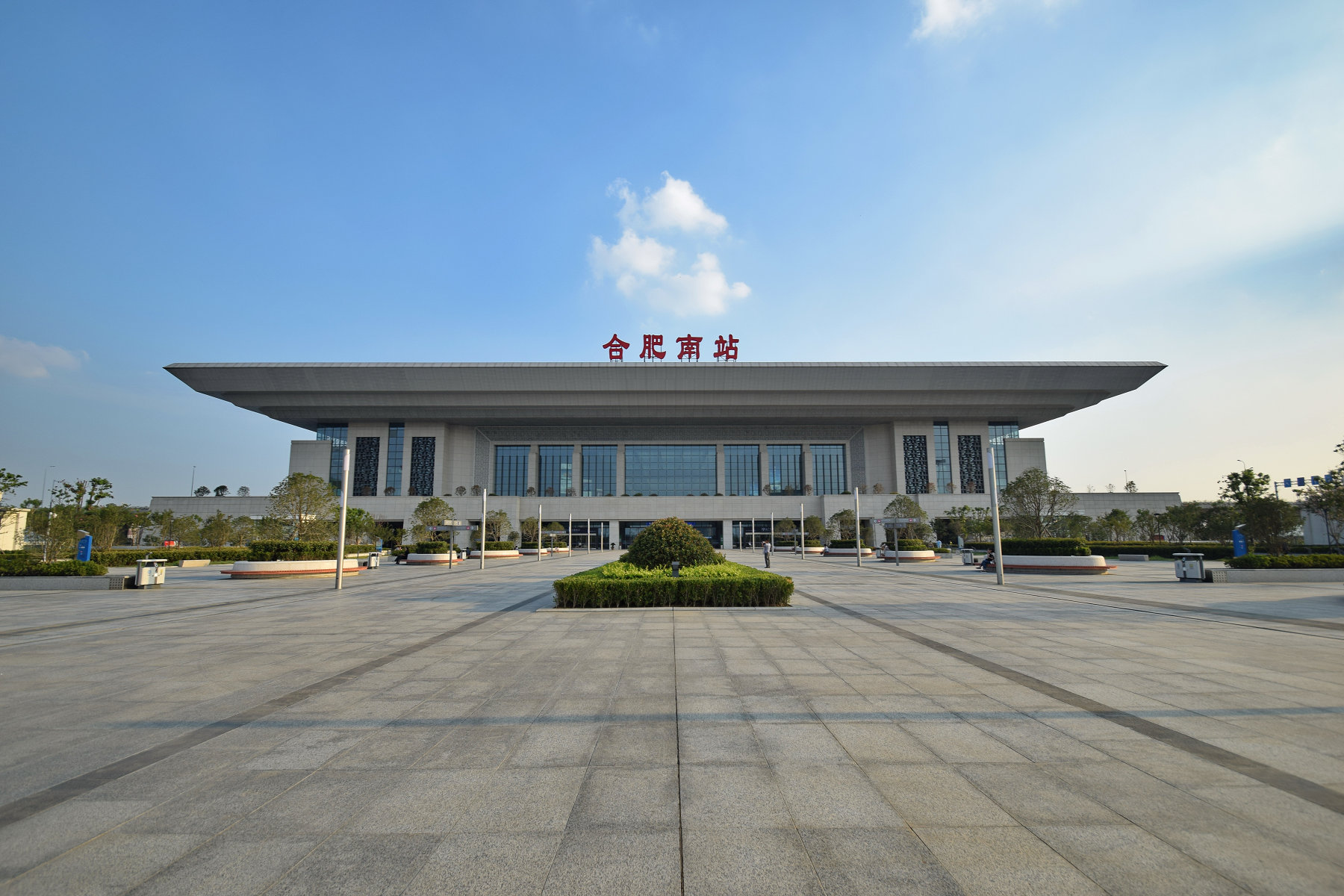
Hefei South Railway Station

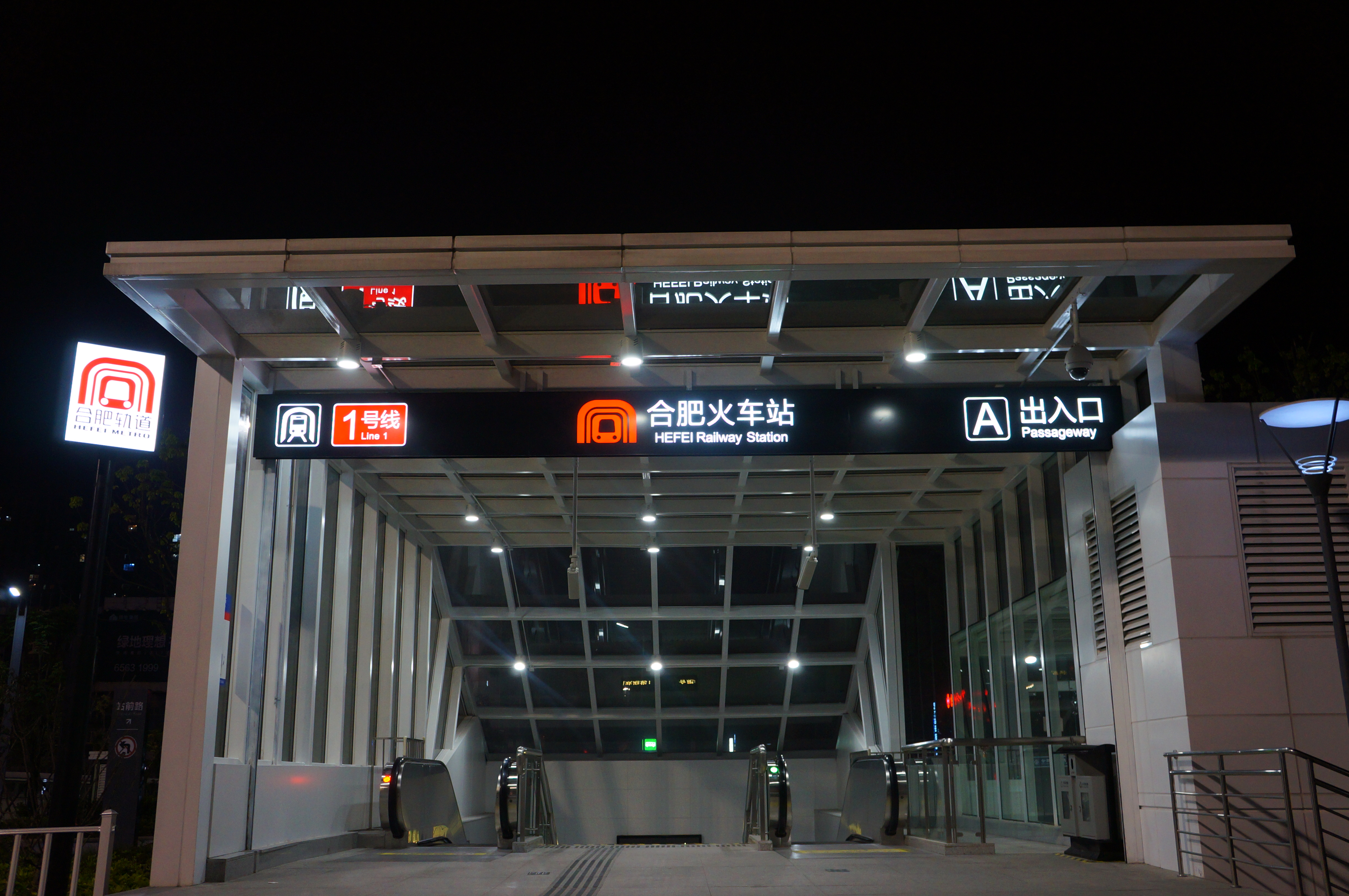
a metro entrance in Hefei

Historically, Anhui's transport network was hampered by the lack of bridges across the Yangtze River, which divides the province into northern and southern regions. The first bridge across the Yangtze in Anhui, the Tongling Yangtze River Bridge, was completed in 1995. As of October 2014, Anhui had four bridges across the Yangtze, at Ma'anshan, Wuhu, Tongling, and Anqing.

=== Rail ===
Anhui lacked a developed railway network until this century: most cities are now connected by a high-speed train system. Hefei South railway station is the high-speed train hub.

=== Highway system ===
The province set an ambitious plan from 2015 to 2025 for highways including:

G3 Beijing-Taipei Expressway

G40 Shanghai-Xi'an Expressway

G42 Shanghai-Chengdu Expressway

S24 Changshu-Hefei Expressway

=== Subway ===
Hefei and Wuhu have subway systems. The Hefei Metro has 2 completed lines, 3 lines under construction and another 10 lines planned. The Wuhu Metro has 2 subway lines under construction and another 3 lines planned.

=== Aviation ===
The province has 5 major commercial airports and another 4 are under construction. Hefei Xinqiao International Airport and Huangshan International Airport are the 2 international airports. The 5 airports in operation are:

- Hefei Xinqiao International Airport (IATA: HFE, ICAO: ZSOF)
- Huangshan Tunxi International Airport (IATA: TXN, ICAO: ZSTX)
- Fuyang Xiguan Airport (IATA: FUG, ICAO: ZSFY)
- Anqing Tianzhushan Airport (IATA: AQG, ICAO: ZSAQ)
- Chizhou Jiuhuashan Airport (IATA: JUH, ICAO: ZSJH)

== Demographics ==
Historical population
Year	Pop.	±%
1912	16,229,000	—
1928	21,715,000	+33.8%
1936–37	23,354,000	+7.5%
1947	22,462,000	−3.8%
1954	30,343,637	+35.1%
1964	31,241,657	+3.0%
1982	49,665,724	+59.0%
1990	56,180,813	+13.1%
2000	58,999,948	+5.0%
2010	59,500,510	+0.8%
2020	61,027,171	+2.6%

Han Chinese make up the vast majority of the population. The Huizhou Chinese-speaking Hui and She are the two largest minorities.

Anhui has a highly unbalanced gender ratio. According to a 2009 study published in the British Medical Journal, in the 1–4 age group, there are 138 boys for every 100 girls, making it among the most unbalanced of provinces in China.

=== Religion ===
Religion in Anhui (Note: The data was collected by the Chinese General Social Survey (CGSS) of 2009 and by the Chinese Spiritual Life Survey (CSLS) of 2007, reported and assembled by Xiuhua Wang (2015) in order to confront the proportion of people identifying with two similar social structures: ① Christian churches, and ② the traditional Chinese religion of the lineage (i. e. people believing and worshipping ancestral deities often organized into lineage "churches" and ancestral shrines). Data for other religions with a significant presence in China (deity cults, Buddhism, Taoism, folk religious sects, Islam, et al.) was not reported by Wang. The number of Muslims is taken from a survey reported in the year 2010.)
1. Christianity (5.30%)
2. Chinese ancestral religion (4.64%)
3. Islam (0.58%)
4. Other religions or not religious people (Note: This may include: Buddhists; Confucians; Deity worshippers; Taoists; Members of folk religious sects; And people not bounded to, nor practicing any, institutional or diffuse religion.) (89.5%)

The predominant religions in Anhui are Chinese folk religions, Taoist traditions and Chinese Buddhism. According to surveys conducted in 2007 and 2009, 4.64% of the population believes and is involved in ancestor veneration, while 5.30% of the population identifies as Christian. According to a 2010 survey, Muslims constitute 0.58% of the population of Anhui.

The reports didn't give figures for other types of religion; 89.48% of the population may be either irreligious or involved in worship of nature deities, Buddhism, Confucianism, Taoism and folk religious sects.

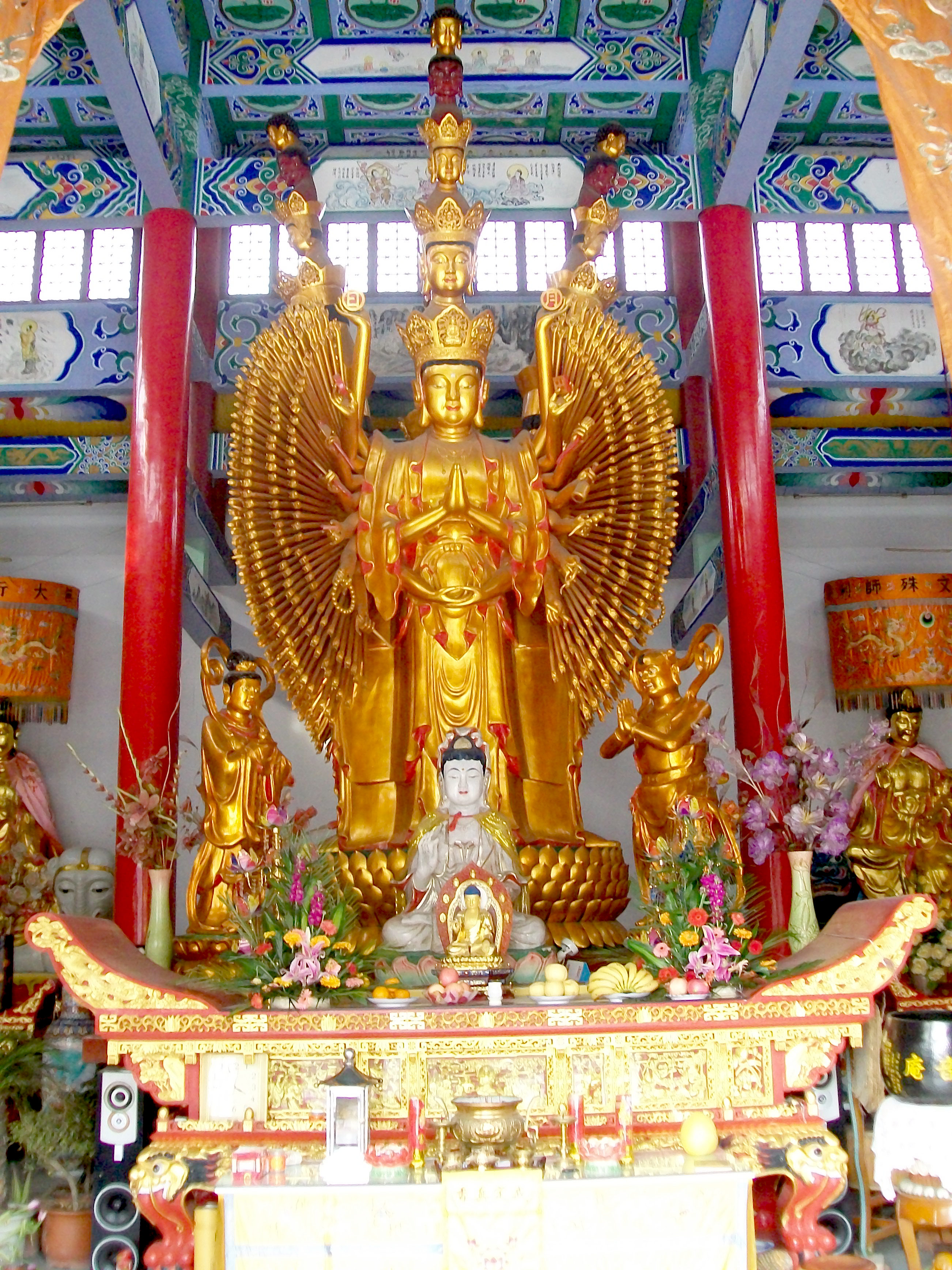
Avalokitesvara of One Thousand Arms at the Guanyin Nunnery.

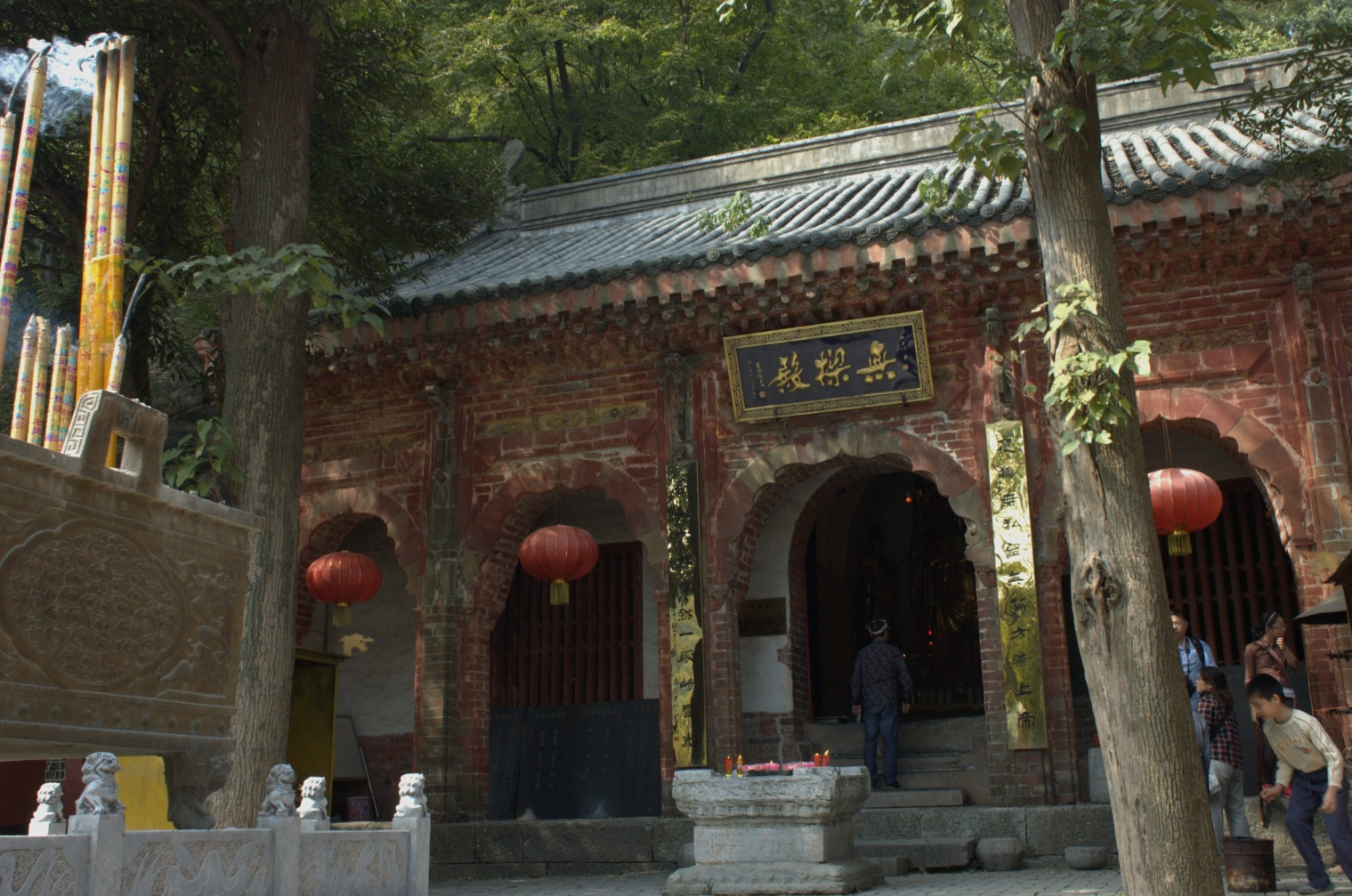
Langya Buddhist Temple in Chuzhou, Anhui

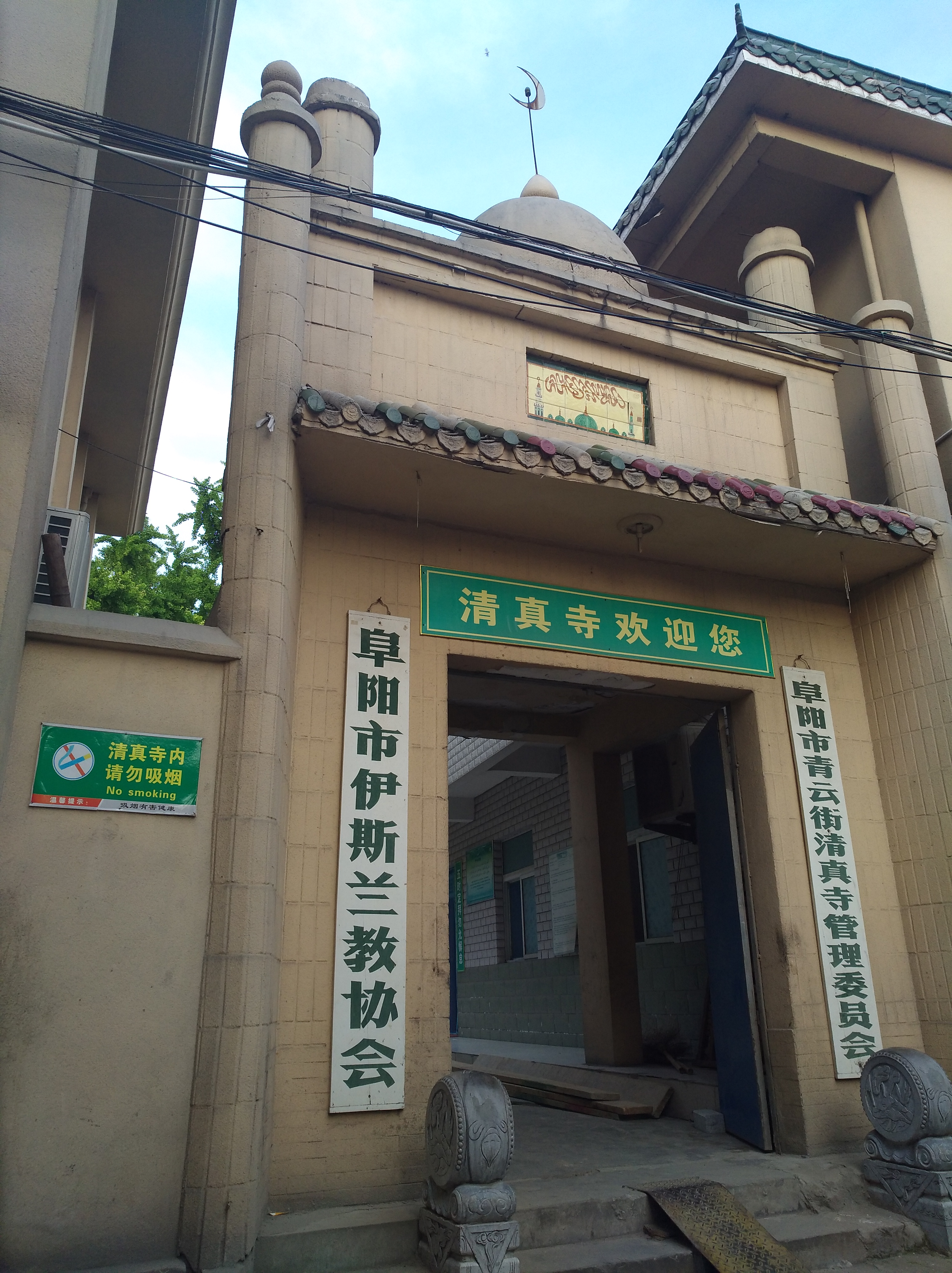
The Qingyun Street Mosque in Fuyang, Anhui

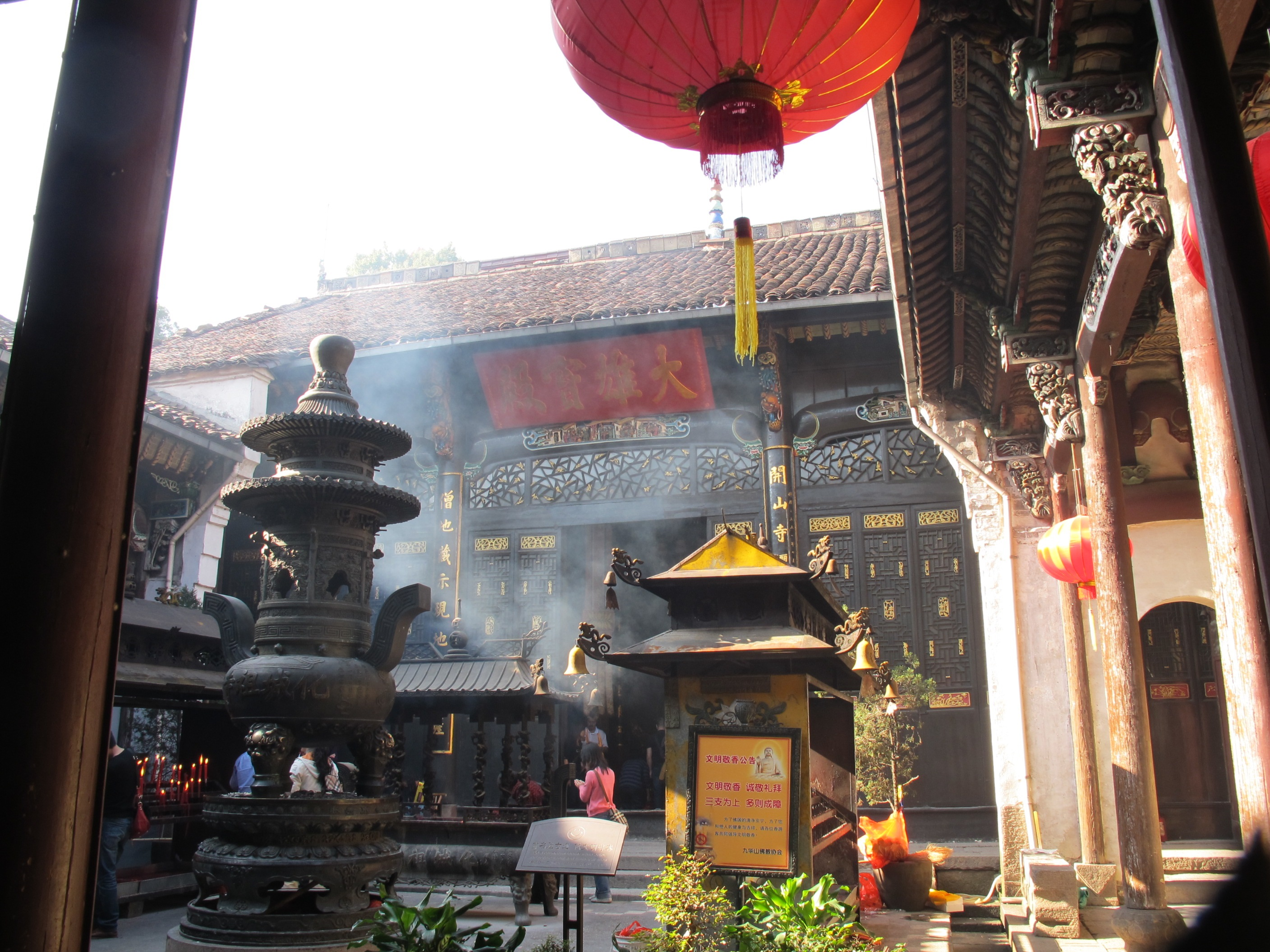
Courtyard of a Buddhist temple in Qingyang County, Anhui

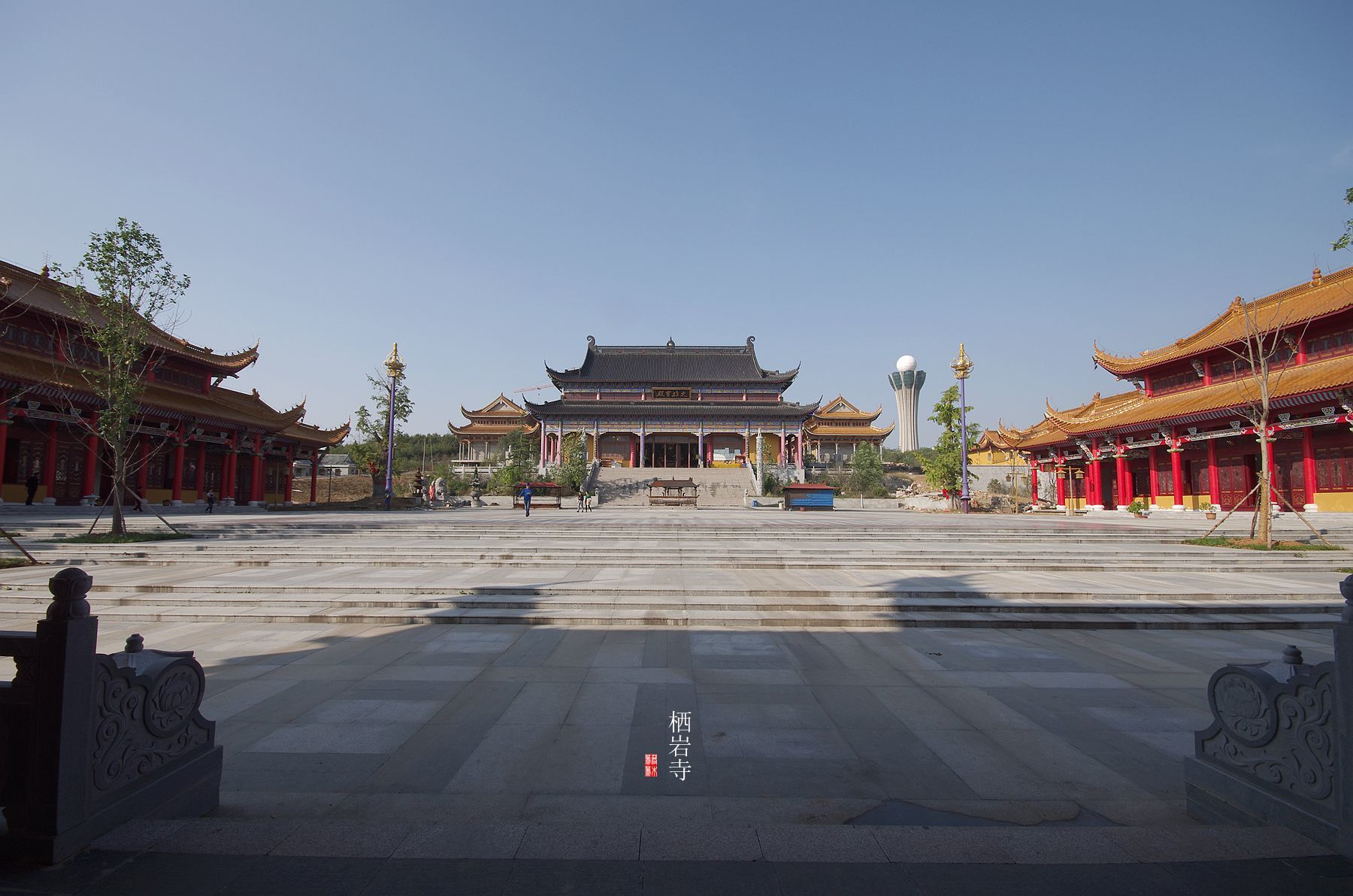
Xiyan Temple

== Culture ==
Anhui spans many geographical and cultural regions. The northern, flatter parts of the province, along the Huai River and further north, are most akin to neighboring provinces like Henan, Shandong and northern Jiangsu. In contrast, the southern, hilly parts of the province are more similar in culture and dialect to other southern, hilly provinces, like Zhejiang and Jiangxi.

Mandarin dialects are spoken over the northern and central parts of the province, north of the Yangtze river. Dialects to the north (e.g. Bengbu dialect) are classified as Zhongyuan Mandarin, together with dialects in provinces such as Henan and Shandong; dialects in the central parts (e.g. Hefei dialect) are classified as Jianghuai Mandarin, together with dialects in the central parts of neighboring Jiangsu province. Non-Mandarin dialects are spoken to the south of the Yangzi: dialects of Wu are spoken in Xuancheng prefecture-level city, though these are rapidly being replaced by Jianghuai Mandarin; dialects of Gan are spoken in a few counties in the southwest bordering Jiangxi province; and the Huizhou dialects are spoken in about ten counties in the far south, a small but highly diverse and unique group of Chinese dialects.

Huangmeixi, which originated in the environs of Anqing in southwestern Anhui, is a form of traditional Chinese opera popular across China. Huiju, a form of traditional opera originating in the Huizhou-speaking areas of southern Anhui, is one of the major precursors of Beijing Opera; in the 1950s, Huiju (which had disappeared) was revived. Luju is a type of traditional opera found across central Anhui, from east to west.

Anhui cuisine is one of the eight great traditions of Chinese cuisine. Combining elements of cooking from northern Anhui, south-central Anhui, and the Huizhou-speaking areas of southern Anhui, Anhui cuisine is known for its use of wild game and herbs, both land and sea, and comparatively simple methods of preparation.

Anhui has a high concentration of traditional products related to calligraphy: Xuanzhou (today Xuancheng) and Huizhou (today Huangshan City) are revered for producing Xuan Paper and Hui Ink respectively, which are traditionally considered the best types of paper and ink for Chinese calligraphy. She County is famous for the She Inkstone, one of the most preferred types of inkstones (a required tool in traditional calligraphy).

== Education ==
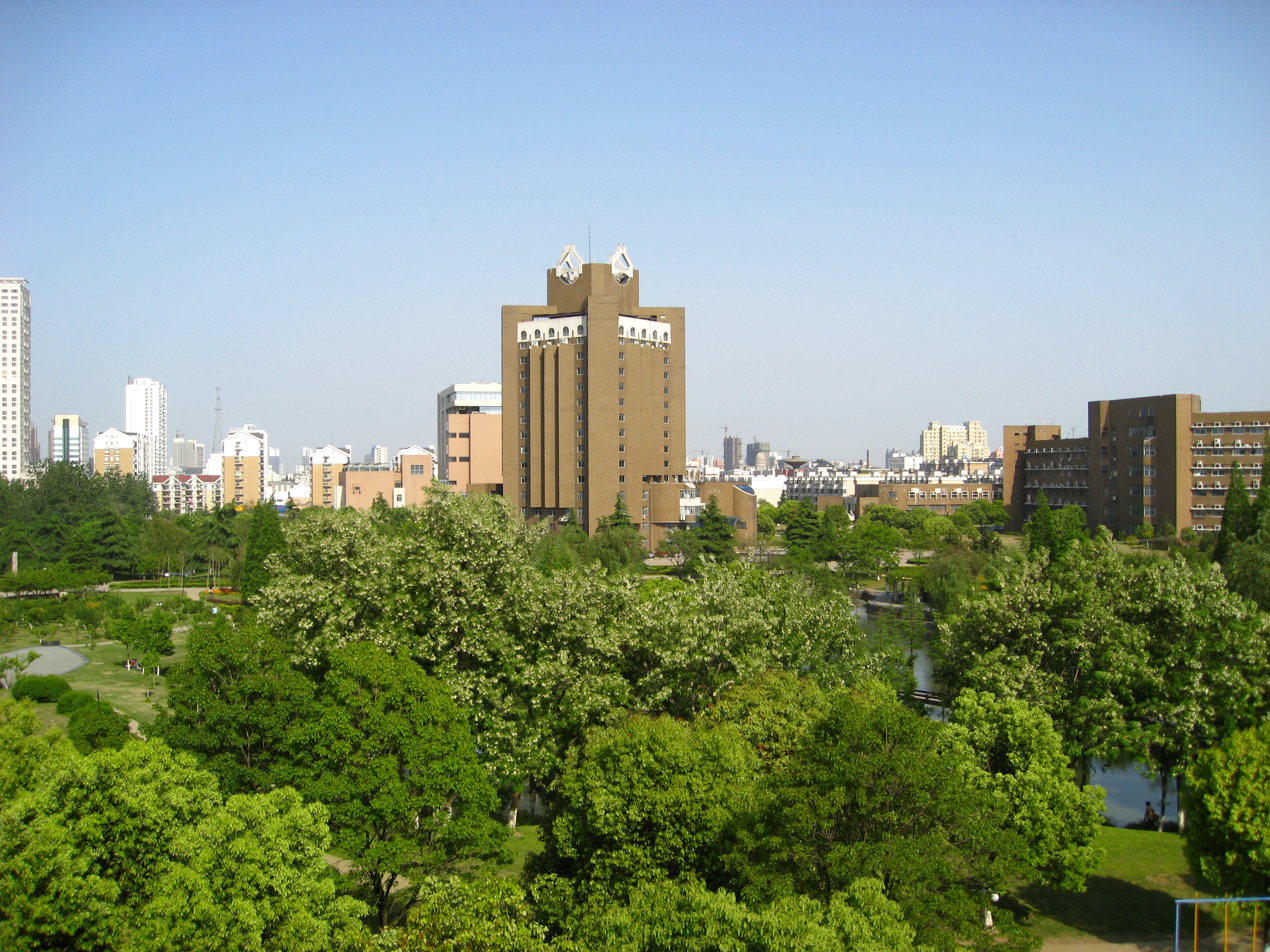
University of Science and Technology of China

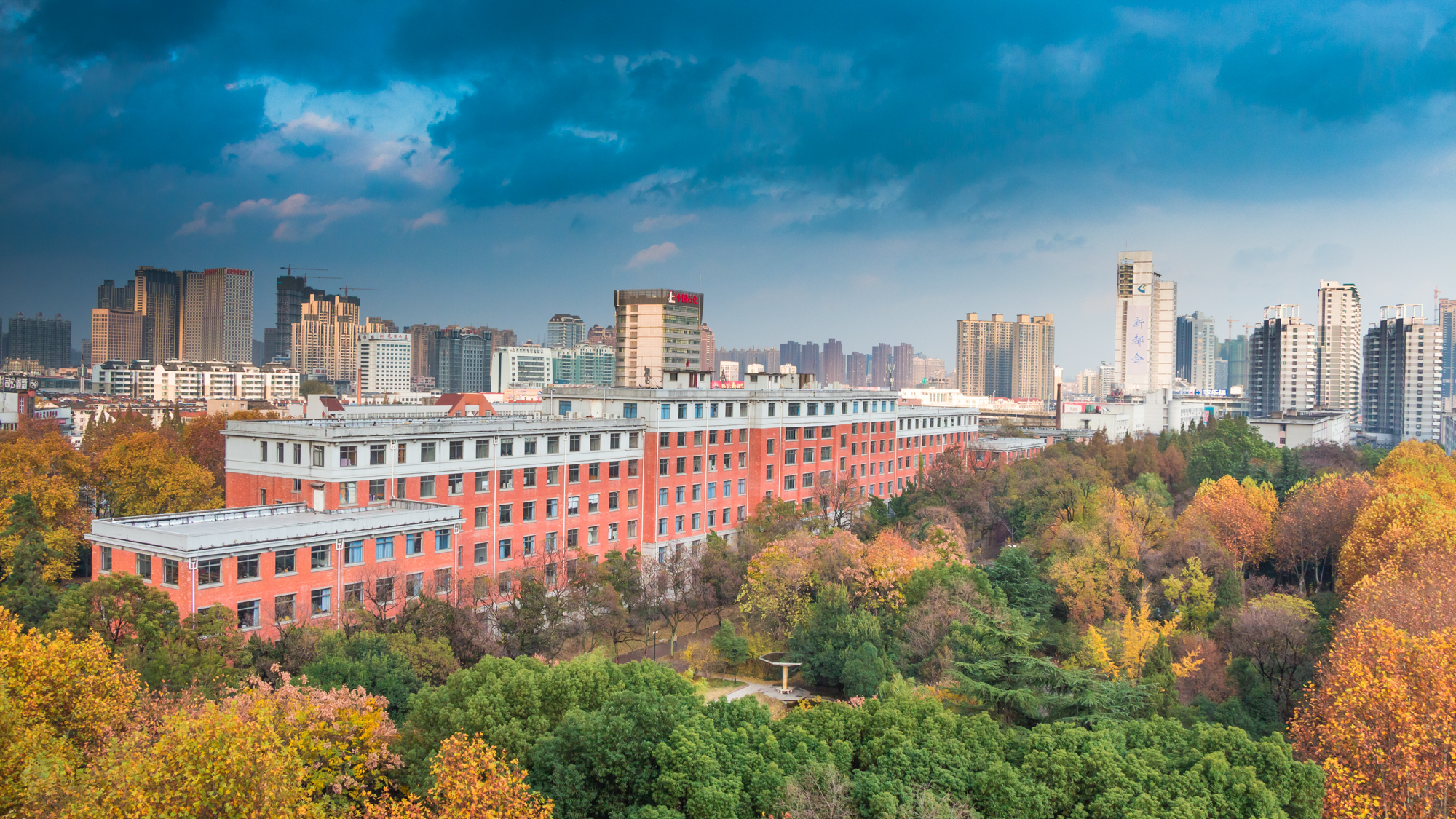
Main Campus of Hefei University of Technology

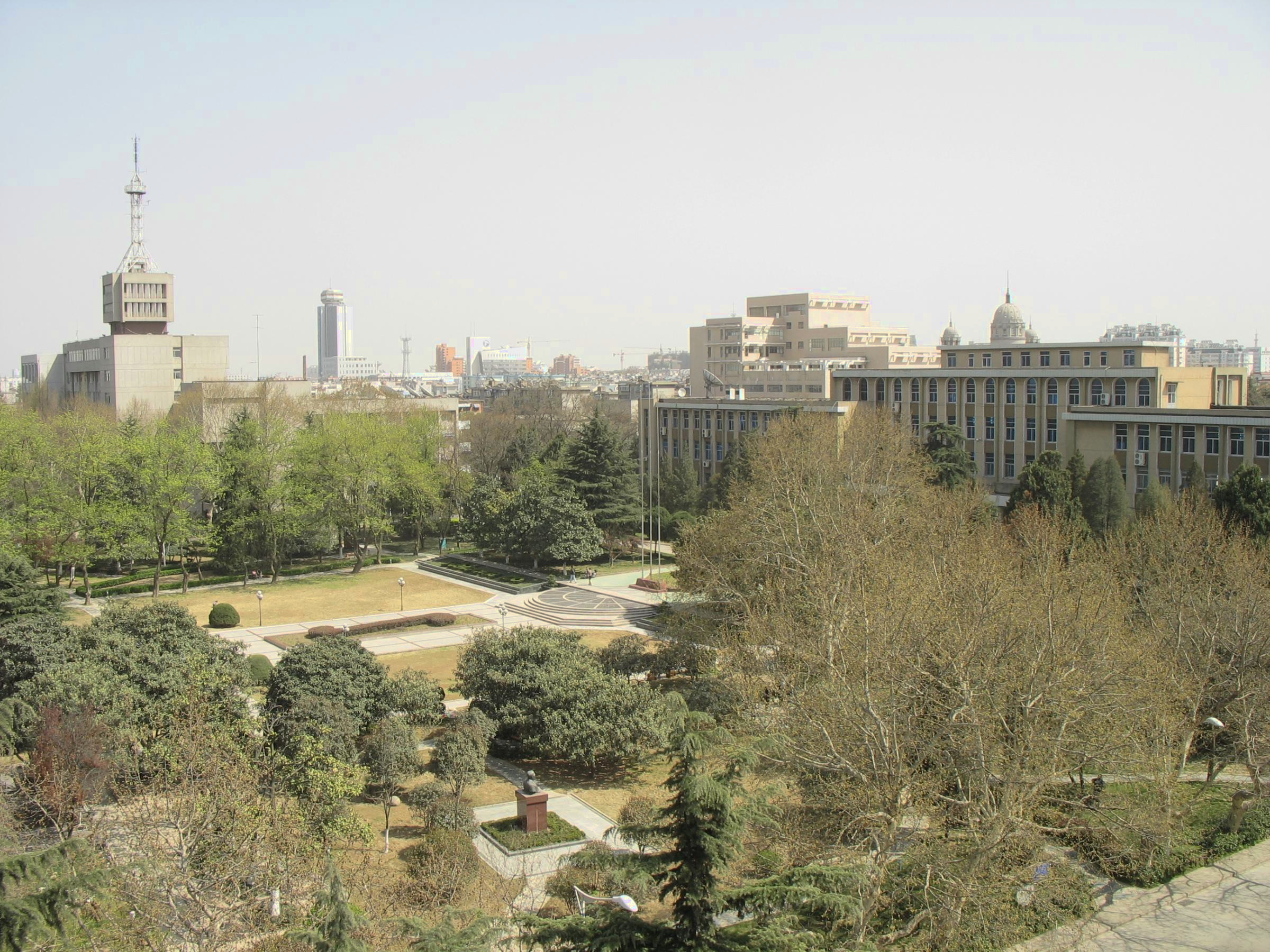
East Campus of University of Science and Technology of China

Some of the highest-ranked universities in the country are found in Anhui. Most universities in Anhui are located in Hefei, Wuhu, Bengbu, and Maanshan. Specifically, Hefei is home to the University of Science & Technology of China.

=== Public universities ===
- University of Science & Technology of China, ranked 6th in the country
- Hefei University of Technology, China well-known Engineering School
- Anhui University, China Key University
- Anhui Agricultural University, in Hefei
- Anhui Medical University
- Anhui Normal University, in Wuhu
- Anhui University of Finance and Economics, in Bengbu
- Anhui University of Technology, in Ma'anshan
- Anhui University of Technology and Science, in Wuhu City
- Anhui University of Traditional Chinese Medicine
- Anhui University of Science & Technology, in Huainan
- Anqing Teachers College, in Anqing
- Fuyang Teachers College, in Fuyang
- Hefei Normal University, in Hefei
- Wannan Medical College, in Wuhu City
- Hefei Institutes of Physical Science, Chinese Academy of Sciences in Hefei
- Beihang University (BUAA) – Hefei Campus
- Beijing Foreign Studies University (BFSU) – Hefei Campus
- Tianjin University (TJU) – Hefei Graduate School
- Peking University (PKU) – Hefei Graduate School
- Tsinghua University (THU) – Hefei Institute of Public Safety Research

=== Military universities ===
- National University of Defense Technology (NUDT) – Hefei Campus
- PLA Artillery University
- PLA Armoured Force University
- PLA Vehicle University
- PLA Air Force Flight Academy(13th)
- Armed Police Command College(Hefei)

== Tourism ==
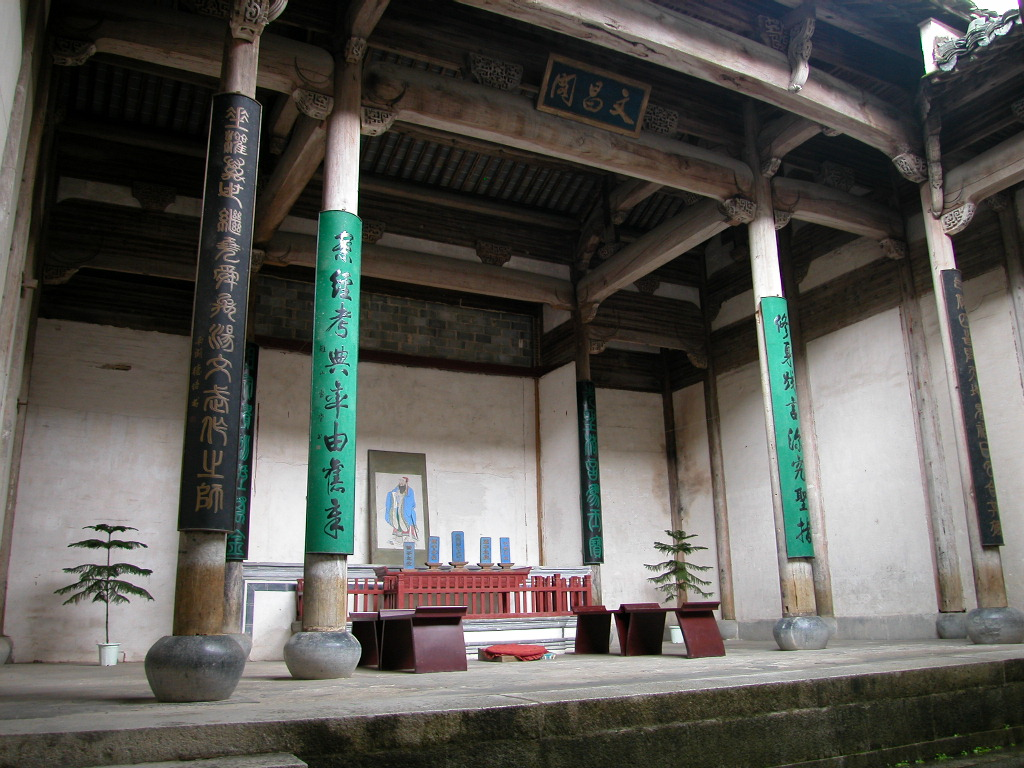
Ancient Villages in Southern Anhui – Xidi and Hongcun.

Anhui's principal tourism sites include the following:

- Ancient Villages in Southern Anhui – Xidi and Hongcun (World Heritage Site).
- Bagong Mountain Scenic Spot
- Chao Lake
- Jing Ting Mountain
- Mount Huangshan (World Heritage Site)
- Mount Jiuhua
- Mount Langya
- Mount Qiyun
- Mount Tianzhu
- Old Town of Tunxi
- Taiji Cave, the longest karst cave in East China.
- Zhenfeng Pagoda, a Ming dynasty pagoda in Anqing City.
- Zuiweng Pavilion, named after the poet Ouyang Xiu (1007–1072 AD).

=== Development ===
In 2008, France helped the Anhui Provincial Tourism Bureau develop a rural tourism demonstration project.

== Notable people ==
- Deng Linlin, artistic gymnast
- Fang Bian, sanshou fighter and professional kickboxer
- Lu Su (172–217), military general and politician serving under the warlord Sun Quan during the late Eastern Han dynasty. Main in here.
- Ouyang Feng, sanshou fighter and professional kickboxer
- Qiu Jianliang, professional kickboxer
- Wang Huiling, author and social media creator
- Xia Jun, economist, telecom researcher and university professor
- Yang Rong, automotive tycoon

== See also ==
- Major national historical and cultural sites in Anhui
