= Anqing Normal University =

University in Anqing, China

- 安庆师范大学
- Former names: Jinfu Academy; Qiushi Academy; Anhui Grand Academy; National Anhui University
- Established: 1897
- President: Zhu Shiqun
- Vice-president: Shi Xinzhong
- CPC Secretary: He Xiaoqun
- Academic staff: 1,300
- Students: More than 22,500
- Location: Anqing, Anhui, China; 30°30′51″N 117°2′53″E
- Campus: 180 mu; 2664.12 mu
- Website: http://www.aqnu.edu.cn/

Anqing Normal University (Chinese: 安庆师范大学), it is the first and only provincial normal university in the southwest of Anhui Province, China. The university is a national base for cultural quality education of college students, an advanced unit in national spiritual civilization construction, a national base for the inheritance of Chinese excellent traditional culture, and an advanced unit in school art education. It is also a school selected for the construction of basic capabilities in central and western China.

As of March 2024, the university has two campuses - Longshan and Linghu, covering an area of 2800 mu (about 186.7 hectares). It has 17 secondary colleges offering 77 undergraduate majors, 11 academic master's degree programs, and 11 professional master's degree authorization categories. The university has more than 1900 faculty and staff members, with over 29,000 full-time students.

== History ==
The origins of the college date back to 1897, when the earliest and largest provincial school in Anhui, Jinfu Academy (敬敷书院), was relocated to Linghu Campus. Famed pundits and traditional scholars such as Liu Dagui, Wang Liangwu, Quan Zuwang and Yao Nai, all served as the headmaster (equivalent to president nowadays). In 1898, the Guangxu Emperor of the Qing dynasty ordered it be renamed as Qiushi Academy (求是学堂). In 1902, it was called Anhui Grand Academy. Later, it became Anhui Military Academy, Anhui Army's Academy, and Anhui Judicial and Political College. In 1928, Anhui Provincial University was formed here. In 1946, it became National Anhui University and thus attained its climax in Chinese modern history of higher education.

After the establishment of the People's Republic of China in 1949, due to the drift of the political center, the school witnessed a series of alterations, though the education mission has never been discontinued. It once became a Navy academy, a normal college, and a branch campus of Anhui Normal College. In May 1980, upon the approval of the State Council, it was renamed Anqing Teachers College and changed to Anqing Normal University in 2016.

Anqing Normal University established a sister institution partnership with Salisbury University in Maryland, United States. Two Salisbury University undergraduate students were the very first to study abroad, at Anqing Teacher's College, and did so during the entire Fall Semester in 2010. In turn, two undergraduate students and a graduate student were the first Chinese students to come to Salisbury University from Anqing.
