= Hefei dialect =

Jianghuai Mandarin dialect of China

- Native to: China
- Region: Hefei city, Feidong County, Feixi County and Changfeng County
- Language family: Sino-Tibetan: Sinitic; Mandarin; Jianghuai Mandarin; Hefei dialect

Language codes
- ISO 639-1: zh
- ISO 639-2: chi (B) zho (T)
- ISO 639-3: cmn

Hefei dialect is a dialect of Jianghuai Mandarin spoken in the Hefei city, Feidong County, Feixi County and Changfeng County.

== History ==
Throughout the history of Hefei, there were frequent wars and great population flow. After Wu Huan Hua and Yiguan Nandu, the pronunciation kept changing. However, because Hefei had always been in the see-saw battlefield of the split era, the land was annihilated by soldiers several times, and most of the real locals today trace their lineage to the Ming Dynasty and later. Given the composition of immigrants from various places, references to the "Hefei dialect" before the Ming Dynasty cannot be compared with the Hefei dialect today.

Nanjing dialect, which evolved from Jinling Yayin in the Six Dynasties, was established as the national official dialect in the Ming Dynasty. Although Hefei was located in a strategic area, it often suffered from military conflict, so the societal influence of Hefei dialect has not been great. However, during the late period of Qing Dynasty, Li Hongzhang, an important official from Hefei, actively led the Westernization Movement, established new factories and investment promotion bureaus in various coastal areas, and brought Hefei dialect to some coastal areas.

Afterwards, Li Hongzhang established the Huai Army, and then established the Beiyang Navy, during which a large number of soldiers who had practiced in Hefei went north. Li Hongzhang abused fellow villagers during this period, so a saying arose that "as long as you can speak Hefei dialect, you will immediately wear a long gun; as long as you know Li Hongzhang, you will immediately change your long gun to a short gun".

Hefei only had a population of 100,000 when People's Republic of China was established. After the provincial capital of Anhui Province was moved to Hefei, the number of migrants surged. Many of them came from outside Anhui Province, and had moved from all over the country. However, there were many dialects in Anhui Province, and there are great differences in pronunciation between the north and the south. Although Hefei dialect belongs to Mandarin, the dialect vocabulary is difficult to understand, and the phonetic system is difficult to master in a short time; The promotion of Standard Mandarin has gradually reduced the number of Hefei dialect users. Although there are TV programs that use the dubbing of "Hefei dialect" in the TV media, since the pronunciation is mostly exaggerated facial makeup but not standard Hefei dialect, the effect of saving the decline of Hefei dialect in the urban area is not optimistic. Unfortunately, dialect usage surveys have shown that "Hefei dialect is on the road of extinction".

== Phonology ==
=== Initials ===
p, pʰ, m, f

t, tʰ, n, l

ts, tsʰ, s, z

tʂ, tʂʰ, ʂ, ʐ

tɕ, tɕʰ, ɕ, (ȵ)

k, kʰ, x

Ø

=== Finals ===
a, ia, ua

ɔ, iɔ

ɤɯ, iɤɯ

u, ʉ

ᴇ, iᴇ, uᴇ

e, ue, ye, i

ɿ, ʅ, ʮ

ɑ̃, iɑ̃, uɑ̃

æ̃, uæ̃

ʊ̃

iĩ, yĩ

ən, in, un, yn

əŋ, iəŋ

ɐʔ, iɐʔ, uɐʔ

ɤʔ, iɤʔ, uɤʔ, yɤʔ

əʔ, iəʔ, uəʔ, yəʔ

=== Tones ===
21

45

213

53

5 (checked)

=== Sandhi ===
21 + 21: The first syllable becomes 212

213 + 21 or 213: The first syllable becomes 212

213 + 45, 53 or 5: The first syllable becomes 21

5 + 45, 213 or 5: The first syllable becomes 21
