= Anhui delegation to the National People's Congress =

Anhui Delegation to the National People's Congress
- 全国人民代表大会安徽省代表团
- Delegation for the National People's Congress
- Map showing the location of Anhui Province
- Electoral unit: Anhui Province
- Population: 61,027,171

Current Delegation
- Created: 1954
- Seats: 111
- Head of delegation: Zheng Shanjie
- Provincial People's Congress: Anhui Provincial People's Congress

The Anhui delegation to the National People's Congress is a delegation composed of deputies representing Anhui Province within the National People's Congress (NPC), the supreme organ of state power of the People's Republic of China. NPC deputies from the Anhui Province are officially elected by the Anhui Provincial People's Congress.

== List of deputies ==
Year	NPC sessions	Deputies	Number of deputies	Ref.
1954	1st	Fang Lingru, Zhu Yunshan, Jiang Yong, He Shikun, He Qiantang, Yu Yanong, Li Youan, Li Buxin, Li Kenong, Li Da, Wang Shiming, Wang Huzhen, Shen Qiyi, Zhou Xinmin, Zhou Gengsheng, Zha Yiping, Zha Qian, Sun Zhongde, Sun Qimeng, Sun Dehe, Ma Leting, Zhang Ruxin, Zhang Jingfu, Zhang Huiting, Liang Xi, Mei Ru'ao, Zhang Bojun, Zhang Yun, Xu Jie, Chen Yinnan, Zeng Xisheng, Cheng Shifan, Xiang Nan, Huang Yan, Ye Duyi, Zhao Puchu, Pan E'an, Zheng Jiuhong, Li Jinxi	39	
1959	2nd	Fang Lingru (female), Wei Bin, Sun Qimeng, Sun Dehe, Zhu Yunshan, Shen Gunan (female), Shen Qiyi, Wang Shiming, Wang Huzhen, Wang Dezhao, Song Naide, Li Youan, Li Kenong, Chen Yinnan, Wu Maosun, Yu Yanong, He Shikun, He Qiantang, Pang Mingyi, Ou Yuanfang, Zhang Jingfu, Zhang Debao, Zhang Xiqi, Zhou Gengsheng, Zhao Puchu, Zhao Chenggu, Zha Yiping, Zha Qian, Ji Mingxuan, Ma Leting, Gui Linqi, Zhang Yun (female), Xu Jie, Zeng Xisheng, Huang Yan, Shu Xiuwen (female), Li Jinxi, Wei Lihuang	39	
1964	3rd	Ding Jizhe, Yu Jiwei, Ma Leting, Wen Yun, Wang Cheng, Wang Zhijia, Wang Zenong, Lu Wu, Ye Duzheng, Liu Jiping, Xu Jie, Lü Zhaoxiang, Zhu Bolu, Zhu Qichang, Zhu Yunshan, Sun Daguang, Sun Bangchang, Sun Qimeng, Sun Ying, Sun Jinghou, Sun Dehe, Shen Gunan, Shen Qiyi, Wang Shiming, Wang Kunren, Wang Huzhen, Wang Dezhao, Yan Kunyuan, Su Zhijian, Li Fanfu, Li Youan, Li Yansong, Li Qitao, Li Baohua, Li Qiang, Yang Yunzhi, Yang Chengzong, Yang Xinhe, Wu Jikang, Wu Bo, Wu Xueqian, Wu Maosun, Wu Hezhen, Wu Yi, Gu Yu, He Dongchang, He Qiantang, Tong Yuanzhen, Zhang Liuyi, Zhang Zhuang, Zhang Jingfu, Zhang Zhizhong, Zhang Kai, Zhang Kaifan, Zhang Dihua, Chen Baiping, Chen Zizai, Chen Xuemeng, Chen Changhua, Chen Hongyou, Chen Ji, Chen Dengke, Chen Cuiwu, Pang Mingyi, Fang Shiliang, Fan Wohe, Ou Yuanfang, Zhou Huaiheng, Zhou Shujia, Zhou Gengsheng, Meng Yu, Zhao Puchu, Zhao Chenggu, Zhao Minxue, Hu Zaodi, Hu Haochuan, Zha Yiping, He Dancheng, Tang Yuantian, Chai Dengbang, Xu Shuming, Zhang Yun, Xiao Kaiying, Qi Yuanxiang, Qi Zuojun, Gong Peng, Huang Yan, Huang Zhen, Jiang Benyi, Ge Guangzhi, Dong Xibai, Shu Xiuwen, Chu Yanqing, Fu Huanguang, Ci Changgan, Lai Shaoqi, Li Jinxi, Dai Houzhen, Dai Ji	99	
1975	4th	Ma Zongmei, Ma Guilan, Wang Guangyu, Wang Peiming, Wang Zenong, Fang Yongmin, Fang Chongquan, Tian Libao, Cheng Lixiang, Cheng Zhonghua, Lü Jifang, Zhu Baolin, Zhu Enxi, Zhu Duyu, Liu Xiangyang, Liu Shoumin, Liu Rulin, Tang Congxian, Xu Buxin, Li Zhengying, Li Shunqin, Li Zhendong, Li Yansong, Yang Hefeng, Yang Chengzong, Yang Xiaochun, Wu Congshu, Wu Chenghui, Wu Yanqiu, Song Peizhang, Zhang Yi'en, Zhang Fengkai, Zhang Xiuying, Zhang Shusheng, Zhang Zuoyin Zhang Jiayun, Zhang Qiande, Chen Guangyou, Chen Yumei, Chen Shichun, Chen Guishan, Chen Qi, Chen Daoyun, Lin Yonggen, Lin Guanghui, Zheng Lingping, Meng Qingyuan, Meng Xueguang, Zhao Zhigui, Hu Lanfang, Yao Chongxin, Nie Liren, Gu Xia, Xu Wencheng, Xu Shanping, Xu Jingzhou, Gao Lanying, Guo Hongguang, Guo Hongjie, Huang Darong, Chang Delong, Liang Shoufu, Han Xueming, Cheng Zhengwei, Cheng Jinglun, Xie Zhaosong, Qiu Qiyu, Teng Shubao, Dai Xinzhi, Wei Liangbing, Wei Jianzhang	71	
1978	5th	Wan Li, Ma Changyan, Ma Wenrui, Ma Guilan, Ma Haoqian, Wang Youdao, Wang Qijie, Wang Jingcao, Wang Zenong, Kai Mingyi, Niu Jiahui, Fang Chuanyou, Fang Xiansong, Ye Huaben, Ye Dengrong, Zhu Xiuying, Zhu Haibo, Zhu Chaojun, Zhu Yunshan, Hua Lirong, Liu Rulin, Xu Youguang, Xu Jie, Xu Xueshou, Sun Qimeng, Yan Kunyuan, Su Ziyou, Li Wennian, Li Shilan, Li Shinong, Li Zhifa, Li Liangnian, Li Dundi, Yang Lanying, Yang Chenggen, Yang Yuanhua, Yang Chengzong, Xiao Peiji, Wu Renyin, Wu Yougen, Wu Guangcai, Wu Yanqiu, Wu Guilin, Wu Delai, He Qiantang, Tong Yuanzhen, Sha Chengxiang, Sha Deyi, Shen Shiyue Shen Lailian, Song Baoshi, Zhang Changyin, Zhang Wenying, Zhang Fakui, Zhang Xueqin, Zhang Zuoyin, Zhang Dihua, Zhang Qiande, Zhang Decai, Chen Qingrui, Chen Xuemeng, Chen Shichun, Chen Guizhen, Chen Jisheng, Chen Dengke, Yu Mingfu, Jin Ke, Zhou Yizhen, Zhou Huaiheng, Zhou Zongying, Zheng Rui, Fang Shiliang, Meng Fulin, Zhao Puchu, Zhao Shouyi, Zhao Minxue, Hu Yaobang, Ke Baifa, Bai Fenglian, Hong Jitang, Yao Maoqi, Luo Liangming, Xia Deyi, Chai Fugui, Gao Yuling, Huang Yongling, Huang Yu, Huang Qizheng, Cao Weimin, Cao Juru, Cui Aiyu, Zhang Lijun, Ge Zhongzhu, Cheng Guanghua, Fu Changtang, Xie Zhengfu, Pan Qiren, Wei Xinyi	98	
1983	6th	Ding Zhi, Wei Gonglan, Ma Changsheng, Ma Yubao, Ma Lan, Wang Yongcong, Ma Haoqian, Wang Ziye, Wang Fenglin, Wang Guangsu, Wang Jingcao, Wang Mao, Wang Zenong, Wang Tengjiao, Gu Huaan, Long Zhengrong, Lu Zhengcao, Ye Duzheng, Guang Renhong, Zhu Yumei, Zhu Yang, Ren Keli, Liu Changren, Liu Sikui, Liu Yuanzhang, Xu Jie, Xu Xueshou, Sun Jingsong, Sun Yufang, Yan Kunyuan, Su Hua, Du Changying, Li Yunlong, Li Chuanhuai, Li Zhongyi, Li Xuemin, Li Yinsuo, Yang Zhongqin, Yang Chengzong, Yang Weiping, Xiao Peiji, Wu Dongzhi, Wu Maosun, Wu Jiansheng, He Yuxiu, He Qingtian, Tong Yuanzhen, Gu Yu, Wang Xuguang, Shen Shiyue, Zhang Wan Shu, Zhang Liguang, Zhang Kaiying, Zhang Hongxiang, Zhang Zuoyin, Zhang Xiaolan, Zhang Dihua, Zhang Xinguo, Chen Tianren, Chen Guanglin, Chen Fudong, Chen Tingyuan, Chen Aiqi, Chen Xiong, Chen Dengke, Shao Fangquan, Lin Xiurong, Zheng Shunying, Qu Guangying, Meng Fulin, Zhao Suyun, Zhao Minxue, Rong Guanghong, Hu Kaiming, Hu Yunlong, Zhong Ying, Hou Shilai, Hou Xueyu, Yu Jinglian, Hong Liu, Yao Jianping, Qin Sue, Xia Bangda, Gu Zhiyu, Xu Lilai, Xu Yongkang, Gao Yuhua, Gao Weiqing, Huang Xuezhi, Huang Huang, Cao Weimin, Cao Yinxiang, Liang Jintang, Ge Tingsui, Dong Yunian, Dong Jianling, Han Guilan, Han Xiangrui, Cheng Guanghua, Wen YuankaiLou Zenghui, Lu Guanping, Pan Yongde	103	
1988	7th	Wei Jie, Ma Lan, Ma Qibin, Ma Xingjiao, Ma Huaizhu, Wang Gong, Wang Fenglin, Wang Jipeng, Wang Guangyu, Wang Mao, Gu Huaan, Shi Bingmi, Shi Xuanzhen, Long Zhengrong, Lu Rongjing, Ye Shengchang, Ye Duzheng, Feng Yongqin, Xing Youying, Lü Baocheng, Zhu Chengyou, Zhu Xianlai, Qiao Chuanxiu, Ren Keli, Ren Xinmin, Liu Xinshu, Liu Sikui, Liu Shengwu, Liu Yuanzhang, Xu Xueshou, Xu Jiazheng, Sun Yangyong, Sun Qingyou, Sun Qimeng, Sun Jingsong, Sun Yufang, Su Hua, Li Yifeng, Li Shidao, Li Jinbao, Li Ronghua, Li Guixiu, Li Yishen, Yang Dake, Yang Jike, Yang Chengzong, Yang Suyun, Yang Haibo, Yang Jinli, Wu Wenfang Wu Dongzhi, Wu Lan, Wu Rangxiang, Wu Huaxia, Wu Huaqiang, Wu Liangju, Wu Jiansheng, Wu Cuilan, Yu Hong, Zou Xiulan, Song Changhan, Song Xiaoxian, Zhang Youdao, Zhang Lizhi, Zhang Xuemin, Zhang Jiashun, Zhang Jiarui, Lu Yongan, Chen Tianren, Chen Guanglin, Chen Zongming, Chen Xiong, Chen Dengming, Chen Dengke, Chen Jinhua, Chen Xintian, Shao Fangquan, Shao Tinggen, Luo Xiaolun, Yue Shucang, Zhou Yude, Meng Fulin, Zhao Suyun, Zhao Minxue, Rong Guanghong, Hu Shufang, Shi Weiguo, Xu Liquan, Xu Chuande, Xu Jingren, Gao Yuhua, Pu Dehua, Huang Weilu, Sheng Ying, Ge Zhonglin, Ge Tingsui, Han Guilan, Xie Yongkang, Lu Guanping, Bao JianguangTan Buzhen, Yan Changgui, Yan Yu	103	
1993	8th	Ding Shikuang, Ding Mingwei, Wei Jie, Ma Lan, Ma Xingjiao, Ma Huaizhu, Wang Taihua, Wang Shiqing, Wang Jipeng, Wang Xinglin, Wang Shaohua, Wang Shengbang, Wang Cina, Zhang Yiren, Feng Maorun, Fang Yiben, Kong Fanchao, Ye Shugen, Ye Xiuhua, Zhu Xianlai, Liu Hanjie, Liu Shengwu, Liu Yuanzhang, Sun Shangzhen, Sun Qimeng, Sun Yufang, Li Yifeng, Li Keqiang, Li Zhenhua, Li Yishen, Yang Chuanxi, Yang Jike, Yang Jinxi, Yang Shunsheng, Yang Suyun, Yang Zhenhuai, Yang Haibo, Yang Puxiong, Wu Wenfang, Wu Rangxiang, Wu Cunxin, Wu Huaxia, Wu Hangsheng, Wu Jiansheng, Wu Junshu, Wu Fuwu, He Guozhen, Yu Genji, Wang Hechi, Wang Yang, Wang Qing, Shen Tanghua, Zhang Yukun, Zhang Ping, Zhang Lizhi, Zhang Jiashun, Zhang Fengsheng, Zhang Jing, Lu Zixiu, Chen Tiangeng, Chen Xinzhao, Chen Zongming, Chen Guiying, Chen Peiyao, Chen Kai, Chen Dengming, Chen Yuanbin, Shao Ming, Shao Tinggen, Ji Kunsen, Zhou Zhengqing, Zhou Zhisheng, Meng Fulin, Zhao Yutao, Zhao Shiqing, Zhao Suyun, Zhao Hengqu, Hu Pingping, Hu Jiduo, Hou Lu, Shi Weiguo, Jiang Linhe, Xuan Zhongguang, Qin Dewen, Mo Yanqiu, Qian Minggao, Xu Liquan, Xu Baoqi, Xu Guixing, Gao Yuhua, Gao Weiqing, Zhu Zongzhi, Gong Cunling, Sheng Yingzhi, Sheng Ying, Cui Zhidong, Liang Tiansheng, Han Shufen, Cheng Bingqi, Fu XishouLu Guanping, Bao Jiangguang, Yan Yu	103	
1998	9th	Ding Shikuang, Ding Mingwei, Yu Zuyao, Wan Liyun, Ma Yuanfei, Ma Xingjiao, Ma Huaizhu, Wang Guangping, Wang Taihua, Wang Bangjie, Wang Jipeng, Wang Huaqing, Wang Shaohua, Wang Xiaojin, Feng Maorun, Fang Zhaoxiang, Kong Fanchao, Ye Xiuhua, Feng Wencheng, Xi Huaiying, Zhu Yuming, Zhu Yunkuo (Hui nationality), Zhu Qingshi, Zhu Weifang, Liu Guangcai, Liu Wei, Xu Meihua, Sun Guangyun, Du Yijin, Li Yifeng, Li Zhongyong, Li Fangwen, Li Xiangling, Li Xun, Li Hezhong, Li Hao, Li Daoyu, Yang Liuqing, Yang Zhenhuai, Yang Zhenbin, Yang Aiguang, Yang Nengyu, Yang Xuxi, Shu Huaide, Xiao Zhenghai, Wu Bangguo, Wu Huaxia, Wu Lifang, He Ping, He Chengguo, Wang Hechi (Tujia ethnic group), Wang Chunlan, Wang Yang, Chi Qiuyan, Zhang Wenchao, Zhang Yumei, Zhang Zili (Hui ethnic group), Zhang Bingchen, Zhang Helin, Zhang Jiashun, Zhang Xuefen, Zhang Lin, Zhang Hui, Zhang Decheng, Chen Xinzhao, Chen Songlin, Chen Zongming, Chen Rongzhen, Shang Chuanbi, Jin Huiqing, Jin Haiping, Zhou Gongshun, Zhou Zhengqing, Zhou Gulian, Zhou Benli, Zhou Guangzhao, Zhou Guangquan, Zheng Yongfei, Zheng Mumin, Meng Fulin, Zhao Shiqing, Zhao Guoping, Zhao Yingnan, Hu Pingping, Hu Shaoshui, Hu Xiaohua, Hou Lu, Hong Tianqiu, Xia Cunling, Chai Xiulian, Xu Liquan, Xu Yan, Xu Baoqi, Gao Zilan, Gao Fuming, Xi Weijing, Jiang Zuojun, Cheng Fenggu, Cheng Jianguo, Fu AiguoChu Jinxia, Tong Huaiwei, Xie Qun, Jin Xilun, Lu Fengming, Cai Qihua, Cai Hongqi, Zang Shikai, Pan Hua, Pan Jingen, Bo Yanhuai, Dai Qi	112	
2003	10th	Ding Shikuang, Ding Haizhong, Wan Liyun (female), Wang Taihua, Wang Xiufang (female), Wang Qimin, Wang Mingli (female), Wang Jinshan, Wang Zhaoyao, Wang Xiaojin, Wang Meixiang, Wei Guangtu, Niu Chuanyong, Fang Ning, Fang Chunming, Zuo Yan'an, Si Min (female), Zhu Yuming, Zhu Xianfa, Zhu Qinglong, Zhu Haiyan (female), Zhu Weifang (female), Zhu Huiqiu (female), Zhu Zhengang, Hua Yan, Liu Weixing, Liu Qingfeng, Liu Qingqiang, Liu Zhanping, Liu Zhenwei, Jiang Laili, Tang Honggao, Xu Geliang, Sun Zhaoqi (Hui nationality), Hua Jianhui (female), Hua Bei (female), Yan Zhongya, Du Yijin, Li Zhongjin, Li Jianmin, Li Rongjie, Li Xiusong, Yang Yada (female), Yang Zhenchao, Yang Zhenbin, Yang Xuxi, Yang Xinren, Xiao Zhenghai, Wu Daxian Wu Bangguo, Wu Cunrong, Wu Huaxia, Wu Minglou, Wu Hongchu, Wu Jiecai, He Ping, Yu Dina (female), Wang Limin, Wang Chunlan (female), Shen Weiguo, Song Weiping, Song Lihua, Zhang Yumei (female), Zhang Ping, Zhang Peiyang (Hui nationality), Chen Shili, Chen Zuoer, Chen Jiagui, Chen Zhangshui, Chen Xianbao, Shao Guohe, Luo Jiarong, Jin Huiqing, Jin Haiping (female), Zhou Zhengqing, Zhou Chengkui, Pang Lijuan (female), Zheng Yongfei, Zheng Zhongxun, Zhao Jingyu (female), Hu Pingping (female), Hu Xuefan, Jiang Yiyong, Jiang Yanqiu (female), Jiang Ying (female), Hong Tianqiu, Hong Lifang, Xuan Lin (female), Geng Guangkuan, Xia Wangping, Xia He, Chai Xiulian, Qian Yongyan, Ni Fake, Xu Jinglong, Gao Yunlian, Guo Wanqing, Xi Weijing(Female), Tao Yisheng (female), Huang Yuezhong, Huang Haisong, Huang Shangshang (female), Cao Jinhai, Kang Shuhuai, Liang Weiguo, Jiang Zuojun, Han Zaifen (female), Han Xiancong, Suo Bingxun (Hui nationality), Cheng Shuigen, Cheng Yongsheng, Cheng Jusheng, Tong Haibao, Pan Yixin, Wei Chao .	115	
2008	11th	Yu Yisu (female), Wang Sanyun, Wang Yafei, Wang Xiufang (female), Wang Hong (female), Wang Mingsheng, Wang Jinshan, Wang Fuhong, Wang Cuifeng (female), Wei Jianghong, Fang Xiping, Fang Chunming, Fang Binxing, Kong Zhaoping, Kong Xiangxi, Zuo Yan'an, Lu Ling (female), Ye Shiqu, Zhu Guoping (female), Zhu Yong, Zhu Haiyan (female), Zhu Duwen, Zhu Weifang (female), Zhu Huiqiu (female), Ren Haishen, Liu Qingfeng, Liu Zhenwei, Liu Jian, Liu Hui (female), Liu Ruilian (female), Liu Depei, Tang Linxiang, Xu Geliang, Xu Chongxin, Sun Yunfei, Sun Zhaoqi (Hui nationality), Sun Zhigang, Ji Bing, Su Xueyun (female, Hui nationality), Li Hongming, Li Guoling (female), Li Ming, Li Rongjie, Li Chong'an, Li Xiusong, Li Aiqing, Yang Yada (female) Yang Yue, Yang Jianbo, Wu Bangguo, Wu Cunrong, Wu Huaxia, Wu Xujun, Wu Minglou, He Bangxi, Yu Xizhi, Yu Dina (female), Yu Minhui, Wang Jirong (female), Wang Hongkun, Wang Chunlan (female), Shen Weiguo, Song Lihua, Song Guoquan, Zhang Qingjun, Zhang Tao, Lu Yaping (female), Chen Xiansen, Chen Qitao, Chen Shulong, Chen Zhangshui, Luo Ping (female), Jin Huiqing, Zhou Su, Pang Lijuan (female), Zheng Yongfei, Zheng Xiaoyan (female), Meng Xiangrui, Zhao Peng, Hou Jianguo, Jiang Yiyong, Yao Yuzhou, Yao Minhe, Yao Guiping (female), Geng Xuemei (female), Xia He, Gu Jianguo, Qian Yongyan, Qian Niansun, Ni Yongpei, Xu Dingfeng, Xu Chonghua (female), Xu Jinglong, Gao Dengbang, Guo Wensan, Xi Weijing (female), Huang Yuezhong, Cao JieCao Jinhai, Cui Wei, Jiang Houlin (female), Han Zaifen (female), Suo Bingxun (Hui nationality), Cheng Yingfeng, Cheng Enfu, Cheng Jing (female), Lu Zhongzhu (female, Hui nationality), Xie Li, Xie Guangxiang, Miao Xuegang, Pan Yixin, Xue Ying (female), Dai Min (female), Tan Jieqing	114	
2013	12th	Ding Hongsuo (female), Yu Yisu (female), Yu Yong, Wang Yafei, Wang Mingsheng, Wang Jinshan, Wang Jinfu, Wang Biao, Wang Cuifeng (female), Wei ~~Jianghong~~, ~~Niu Nutao~~, Fang Xiping, Kong Xiangxi, Lu Ling (female), Ye Shiqu, Bai Jinming (Manchu), Bi Xiaobin, Zhu Haiyan (female), Zhu Weifang (female), Ren Haishen, Liu Hanru, Liu Qingfeng, Liu Li (female), Liu Zhongfan, Liu Zhenwei, Liu Qin (female, Hui), Liu Depei, Jiang Bo, An Jin, Xu Geliang, Xu Baocheng, Xu Jiwei, Sun Zhaoqi (Hui), Ji Bing, Du Yingliu, Li Yang, Li Hong (female), Li Ming, Li Aiqing, Li Xiangbin, Li Bin (female), Li Xia (female), Yang Yada (female), Yang Jie (female), Yang Jianbo, Yang Guisheng, Yang Jingnong, Wu You Sheng, Wu Guangchun (female), Yu Lin, Wang Hongkun, Wang Yang, Shen Qiang, Song Lihua, Song Guoquan, Zhang Qingjun, Zhang Jian, Zhang Baoshun, Zhang Xiaolin, Zhang Tao, Zhang Xiang'an, Zhang Shaochun, Zhang Shuguang, Lu Shengxiang, Chen Ping, Chen Guanghui, Chen Xiaojing (female), Chen Xuedong, Chen Qiong (female), Luo Ping (female), Luo Jianguo, Jin Huiqing, Pang Lijuan (female), Zheng Yongfei, Zheng Xiaohe, Zheng Jie, Zheng Xiaoyan (female), Zhao Wanping, Zhao Xinqun (female), Hu Daming (female), Hu Liansong, Hou Jianguo, Hou Ximin, Yao Minhe, He Haitao, Geng Xuemei (female), Xia Yufa, Xia Yujie (female), Qian Niansun, Ni Yongpei, Xu Jin, Xu Congxiang, Gao Yafei, Gao Li (female), Guo Wensan, Tao Qunnan (female), ~~Cao Yong~~, Chong Quan, Peng Weiping (female), Peng Shou, Jiang Houlin (female), Han Zaifen (female), Han Jun, Suo Bingxun (Hui nationality), Cheng Enfu, Xie Guangxiang, Yu Aihua, Zhan Xialai, Zang Shikai, Miao Xuegang, Xue Jiangwu (female), Xue Ying (female), Tan Jieqing	113	
2018	13th	You Quan, Xie Guoming, Zhu Mingchun, Xian Tieke, Cheng Enfu, Dou Xiaoyu (female), Xu Hui, Zhou Jianjun, Sun Qixin, Ding Shiqi, Ding Hongsuo (female), Yu Pitao, Wang Chuanlin, Wang Xiaoqiao (female), ~~Wang Cheng~~Wang Jianwei, Wang Shaonan, Wang Zuwei, Wang Rongchuan, Wang Mengmeng (female), Wang Cuifeng (female), Niu Chaoshi, Fang Zhihong, Yin Tongyue, Kong Xiaohong, Kong Tao, Deng Xiangyang, Zuo Jun, Lu Ping, Lu Lingbao, Ye Luzhong, Bao Xinhe, Shan Yabin (Hui), Lü Hui (female), Lü Lianggong, Zhu Duwen, Ren Qianli, Liu Hanru, Liu Qingfeng, Liu Li (female), Liu Xiuyun (female), Liu Rongyu (female), Liu Qin (female, Hui), Liu Hui, Xu Jiwei, Sun Zhengdong, Sun Xuelong, Du Yan'an, Du Yingliu, Li Xiaoli (female), Li Weihua, Li Guoying, Li Suping (female), Li Aiqing, Li Xiangbin, Li Jinbin, Yang Jun, Yang Jie, Yang Shanlin, Yang Shanhong (female), Wu Yousheng, Wu Yongli, Wu Meifang (female), Shen Suli (female), Zhang Fan Hua, Zhang Tianpei, Zhang Dongyun, Zhang Xiaocheng, Zhang Laihui, Zhang Hongmei (female), Zhang Rongzhen (female), Zhang Li (female), Zhang Jian, Lu Shengxiang, Chen Xianzhe, Chen Bingbing, Chen Lin, Chen Jianyin (female), Chen Jing (female), Luo Ping (female), Luo Jianguo, Yue Xihuan (female), Jin Baokang, Zhou Fugeng, Zhao Yuxiu (female), Zhao Wanping, Hu Qisheng, Yao Shunwu, He Maoxie, Yuan Liang, Geng Xuemei (female), Xu Hengqiu (female), Xu Congxiang, Ling Yun (female), Gao Li (female), Huang Chunyan (female), Cao Renxian, Cui Jianmei (female), Zhang Changping, Liang Jinhui, Peng Shou, Dong Kaijun, Han Zaifen (female), Cheng Ding, Cheng Hanfei, Chu Xiaoqin (female), Xie Guangxiang, Yong Chenghan, Pan Baochun, Xue Jiangwu (female), Dai Qiyuan, Tan Jieqing, Wei Zhen	113	
2023	14th	Ding Shiqi, Ding Defen, Ding Yi, Wan Baonian, Ma Jun, Ma Jun, Wang Bing, Wang Yunmin, Wang Zhongcai, Wang Jianwei, Wang Shaonan, Wang Min, Wang Qingxian, Wang Cuifeng, Fang Shiyuan, Yin Tongyue, Kong Tao, Gu Xiaoyu, Ye Hongyi, Tian Yunpeng, Yin Juan, Bao Xinhe, Ningbo, Lü Hui, Zhu Haodong, Zhuang Yumin, Liu Yujie, Liu Qingfeng, Liu Qian, Liu Xiaohua, Liu Haiquan, Liu Jizhong, Liu Qin, Liu Huizhen, Yan Yongzhi, Sun Xuelong, Sun Yong, Du Yingliu, Li Bifang, Li Faquan, Li Yang, Li Jinbin, Yang Shanhong, Yang Guangqi, Yang Miaomiao, Yang Shanhong, Wu Jin, Wu Chunmei, Wu Jiabing, Wu Meifang, He Shushan, He Chunkuan, Yu Qingqing, Ying Yong, Wang Huadong, Zhang Chengwei, Zhang Zhiju, Zhang Zhiqiang, Zhang Xiao, Zhang Junyi, Zhang Li, Zhang Daohong, Zhang Xia, Chen Dawei, Chen Xiaomei, Chen Jun, Chen Hongfeng, Chen Wu, Chen Jing, Chen Ying, Luo Yunfeng, Luo Ping, Jin Baokang, Zhou Jinbo, Zhou Min, Zheng Lei, Zhao Wanping, Hu Xiaochun, Yu Shuhong, Fei Gaoyun, Yao Jinjian, Qin Fengyu, Yuan Fang, Yuan Liang, Yuan Bin, Jia Liang, Qian Sanxiong, Qian Guilun, Xu Xiaochan, Xu Congxiang, Guo Guoping, Tao Minglun, Huang Chunyan, Cao Renxian, Liang Yanshun, Liang Jinhui, Peng Fenglian, Peng Shou, Han Yongsheng, Han Yonggang, Han Zaifen, Han Jun, Hui Fenglian, Jing Hanchao, Cheng Tao, Cai Dafeng, Pan Dongxu, Pan Baochun, Wei Zhen	111	
