= Wang Huiling =

Chinese author and social media creator

Wang Huiling (王慧玲, born 1982), known online as Ling Jie (Sister Ling, 玲姐), is a Chinese author, feminist commentator, and social media content creator. From a rural and working-class background, she is known for discussing the challenges faced by rural and working-class women in China, particularly those relating to marriage, gender inequality, financial independence, and family relationships.

Wang gained widespread attention in 2020 through short videos posted on Douyin, China’s domestic version of TikTok, in which she questioned traditional attitudes towards marriage and family. According to contemporary media reports, discussions related to her content attracted 380 million views and more than 100,000 participants. By early 2025, her Douyin account had over four million followers, making her a widely followed voice in online discussions of women’s rights in China.

She is the author of the books Grassroots Women (基层女性, 2021) and A Survival Guide for Grassroots Women (基层女性生存指北, 2023). Wang’s life and views have been covered by Chinese media outlets including Sanlian Lifeweek, Beijing Youth Daily, and China Business News, as well as international publications such as the British newspaper The Guardian. Her work has been the subject of English-language academic articles examining digital feminism, social class, women’s public expression, and online communities.

In January 2025, Wang's main social media accounts were banned. In April 2025, her book Grassroots Women (2021) was banned from being reprinted. The banning of her work is seen as part of a wider political trend in which Chinese feminists face increasing opposition for discussing or advocating for women’s rights. Her work has been described by academics as "illustrating the paradox of feminist visibility in authoritarian platforms".

== Personal life ==
Wang Huiling was born into a farming family in a rural area of the Dabie Mountains (Dàbié Shān) of Anhui Province, China in 1982. She was the eldest of three children and has two younger brothers. She received limited formal education, graduating from junior high school in 1996. Growing up, she observed traditional gender roles within her family, including the extensive agricultural work, domestic labour, and childcare responsibilities undertaken by her mother. These experiences influenced her views on marriage, family relationships, and gender inequality.

Coming from a village with more conservative social norms, Wang Huiling did not consider herself to be a feminist. “It was only later that I realised I was part of the feminist community and that women fighting for their human rights were feminists.”

After completing vocational secondary school education in Hefei in 1999, Wang moved to Shanghai. She worked in various occupations, always learning new skills to move up, and taught herself Japanese. She met her future husband through a chat app, as they shared an interest in learning Japanese. A British national, he had come to Shanghai as an English teacher. They married in 2008, and later developed an architectural photography company together. In 2015, she took up painting and illustration, which she has described as a "true passion". Wang Huiling lived and worked in Shanghai for approximately two decades before the couple relocated to the United Kingdom. They left Shanghai on February 24, 2023.

== Career ==
=== Social media development ===
In 2020, Wang began publishing short videos on Douyin (a Chinese vlogging platform), discussing the challenges faced by women with limited financial resources in marriage, family life, and personal development. She gained widespread attention through videos addressing the difficulties faced by grassroots women in marriage. In one widely circulated video, she compared marriage to a business partnership, using this analogy to examine women’s domestic labour, reproductive responsibilities, and financial risks within marriage. The video generated extensive discussion and became a trending topic on the social media site Weibo.

Wang has been described as having "a blunt and distinctive voice that resonated with a wide audience." In November 2020, Shidian Renwuzhi (十点人物志) reported that topics associated with Wang had attracted 380 million views and more than 100,000 participants.

Her content subsequently expanded to include women’s education, family relationships, financial independence, romantic relationships, and personal autonomy. She also hosted livestreamed call-in lianmai counseling sessions, during which she discussed family conflicts, intimate relationships and personal difficulties with female viewers who called in to speak with her. Listeners frequently responded in chat.

In November 2021, Beijing Youth Daily reported that Wang had more than 1.3 million followers. Her online audience continued to grow, and by early 2025, her Douyin account had over 4 million followers.

Wang’s content circulated across several Chinese social media platforms, including Douyin, Weibo, and Bilibili. Her audience included rural women, working-class women, and women interested in issues relating to marriage and family life.

=== Books and sales ===
In 2021, Wang published her first book, Grassroots Women (基层女性), through China Friendship Publishing Company. The book examines how family background, economic circumstances, and traditional gender expectations shape women’s lives and choices. In 2025, China Business News (Yicai) examined China’s feminist publishing market, reporting in its feature “Women’s Narratives Are a Good Thing” (女性叙事是个“好东西”) that cumulative sales of Grassroots Women had exceeded 700,000 copies. Part of the book's success was attributed to directly dealing with and sincerely responding to the real problems of a group that had been neglected in the publishing industry. Grassroots Women was also translated into Vietnamese and published in Vietnam in 2023 by Nhà xuất bản Dân Trí, under the title Sức Mạnh Của Sự Độc Lập (The Power of Independence).

In 2023, Wang published her second book, A Survival Guide for Grassroots Women (基层女性生存指北), through Taihai Publishing House, continuing her exploration of financial independence, intimate relationships, personal development, and the social circumstances of grassroots women.

=== Feminist views and social influence ===
Wang’s public commentary focuses primarily on the relationship between gender and socioeconomic inequality, particularly the restrictions faced by rural and working-class women in education, employment, marriage, and access to economic resources. She challenges traditional expectations that marriage, childbirth, and family responsibilities are inevitable stages in women’s lives. She emphasises financial independence, personal autonomy, and the importance of recognising unequal power structures within families and intimate relationships.

Rather than relying heavily on academic terminology, Wang communicates her views through personal experiences, everyday examples, and accessible language. Wang’s livestreamed call-in counselling sessions on Douyin have been studied to see how rural women use their voices to share personal experiences, family conflicts, and social pressures. Interactions between the livestream host, callers, and listeners, as well as the role of platform technologies, all shaped the expression and circulation of women’s experiences. Within this format, the embodied voices of the callers produced a sense of emotional intimacy, while the audience’s participation worked to regulate rural women’s voices. The unaltered quality of callers' voices was identified as important in creating an emotionally charged "acoustic milieu" in which listeners had "a willingness to be unsettled by a stranger’s voice". The host as mediator was both supportive and authoritative, "urging the listener to confront rather than absorb suffering".

Wang’s approach to social media has helped bring the experiences of some rural and working-class women into wider public discussions. A study of Wang’s Douyin livestreams and the videos edited and shared by her community of supporters has explored how Wang’s livestream interactions, sharing of personal experiences, and discussions of women’s difficulties contributed to feminist identification, emotional support, and mutual assistance among viewers. The authors also investigated how supporters continued to circulate related content through edited videos and other online channels after the removal of Wang’s main accounts in January 2025.

=== Social media bans and publishing restrictions ===
In January 2025, Wang Huiling's accounts on Douyin and other social media platforms were removed. On 31 January 2025, the English-language publication China Report reported on the disappearance of her Douyin account. On 15 October 2025, The Guardian published an article by journalist Amy Hawkins examining restrictions on feminist expression in China. The article identified Wang as one of the feminist content creators affected and noted that her Douyin account had previously attracted more than four million followers. According to The Guardian, Wang received no specific explanation for the removal of her accounts. In April 2025, her first book Grassroots Women (2021) was banned from being reprinted, although existing copies remained available for sale through online retailers. Wang stated “I don’t know the specific reason for the ban, but it was probably because they were afraid of my awakening of independence in some women.”

A 2026 study published in Women’s Studies International Forum noted that following the removal of Wang’s main accounts, some supporters continued to preserve, edit, and redistribute her videos, allowing related discussions to continue online.

The bans on her work have been discussed as part of a wider political trend in China in which Chinese feminists have faced increasing opposition for discussing or advocating for women’s rights. The Chinese government has promoted a strongly patriarchal culture, exhorting women to embrace traditional roles in marriage and child-bearing.

=== Academic response ===
Wang's practice has been closely explored by academics. Wang’s online commentary on Bilibili has been analysed to examine how she challenged traditional social narratives and marriage expectations surrounding unmarried women from the perspective of rural and working-class women. Drawing on digital feminism and public sphere theory, researchers have explored how grassroots women participate in online discussions of gender issues and how platform governance and censorship affect these spaces.

On her platforms, Wang frequently used kinship language, offered peer-to-peer support, and engaged in consciousness-raising practices that reframed personal struggles in terms of the structures of patriarchy. Through these practices, she built feminist community. For example, Wang sometimes used the phrase “Little sisters, today we continue our fight together”. Participants were enabled to reframe individual perspectives such as “my family is difficult” and replace them with analyses of wider societal structures such as “patriarchal family systems exploit daughters”.

Wang's popularity and use of rhetoric attracted opposition and censorship. The “clipped accounts” of fans have preserved and recirculated Wang's content in spite of the blocking of her accounts. Fans have actively altered and presented her content by recording and editing livestream highlights, adding emotional overlays such as music, creating cartoon memes to conceal Wang's face while sharing her voice, and incorporating slogans like “women's awakening” and other feminist content into beauty tutorial videos, The creation of this distributed network of preserved information is seen as an example of how communities can adapt to platform restrictions. Wang's practice and experiences have been described as an example of digital feminist resilience under authoritarianism.

== Bibliography ==
- Wang, Huiling (2021). Grassroots Women 基层女性. China Friendship Publishing Company 中国友谊出版公司. ISBN 9787505752405. In Vietnamese as Vương, Huệ Linh (25 September 2023). Sức Mạnh Của Sự Độc Lập (The Power of Independence). Nhà xuất bản Dân Trí. ISBN 978-6048871246.
- Wang, Huiling (2023). A Survival Guide for Grassroots Women 基层女性生存指北. Taihai Publishing House 台海出版社. ISBN 9787516834787.
