= Xia Jun (economist) =

Chinese economist and researcher

- 夏俊
- Education: Beijing University of Posts and Telecommunications (PhD)
- Occupation: Professor

Xia Jun (Chinese: 夏俊; pinyin: Xià Jùn), a Chinese economist and telecom researcher, is currently Professor at Beijing University of Posts and Telecommunications (BUPT) School of Economics and Management, Beijing, China.

== Education ==
PhD (Mgmt. Sci.), MPhil (Bus. Econ.)

== Career ==
Xia is a Professor in the School of Economics and Management at Beijing University of Posts and Telecommunications (BUPT), China. He held various visiting appointments at higher-learning institutes such as the University of Chicago, London School of Economics, Indiana University, Bloomington, and Bowling Green State University. Prior to joining BUPT, his previous career encompassed engineering, international investment and trade, and consultancy.

Xia served or serves on editorial boards of leading journal, conference program committees, in addition to occasionally as ad hoc referee for a number of leading scholarly journals.

== Academic interests ==
Xia's academic interests primarily lie in industrial organization of the information and communication technology (ICT) industry, in addition to a longtime interest in strategic marketing and governance mechanism. His most recent emphasis is on the institutional approach toward competition and regulation, universal service and rural information policy in China.

Academic achievements include: 1) original inquiries into the intrinsic mechanisms of telecom SOEs' (State-Owned-Enterprises) market behaviors, competition development, and hence regulatory imperatives in a state-dominated telecommunications industry in transitional economies like China; 2) systemic research in and extensive insights on the institutional/policy aspect of the telecom industry in developing countries like China.

Xia has published actively in leading international scholarly journals and spoken at various occasions, national and international. He is interviewed/covered in national media like CNTV, (China Central Television) China Daily, and People's Posts and Telecom News. He edited a special issue on "China's 3G industry and beyond" for Telecommunications Policy, a leading international journal of ICT economy, governance and society.

Xia advised China's government on the policy and regulation in universal telecommunications service as well as Chinese telcos on strategic marketing. He was instrumental in drafting the telecommunications universal service regulations for the Ministry of Information Industry (MII), the former industry regulator in China.

He has written on telecom policy, on the Digital Divide in Chinese information policy, and on competition and regulation in the Chinese telecom industry

== Publications ==
- Xia, J. (2012). Competition and Regulation in China's 3G/4G Mobile Communications Industry – Institutions, Governance, and Telecom SOEs. Telecommunications Policy, 36(7), 503-521.
- Xia, J. (2011). The Third-Generation-Mobile (3G) Policy and Deployment in China: Current Status, Challenges, and Prospects. Telecommunications Policy, 35(1), 51-63.
- Xia, J. (2010). From Iron Fist to Invisible Hand: The Uneven Path of Telecommunications Reform in China. Telecommunications Policy, 34(5-6), 343-345.
- Xia, J. (2010). Linking ICTs to Rural Development: China's Rural Information Policy. Government Information Quarterly, 27(2), 187-195.
- Xia, J. & Lu, T.-J. (2008). Bridging the Digital Divide for Rural Communities: The Case of China. Telecommunications Policy, 32(9-10), 686-696.
- Xia, J. (2007). Towards a Sustainable Institutional Arrangement for USOs in China: Current Status, Support Mechanisms, and Regulatory Governance. I/S: A Journal of Law and Policy for the Information Society, 3(1), 147-181.
