= List of Joker Xue live performances =

Joker Xue live performances
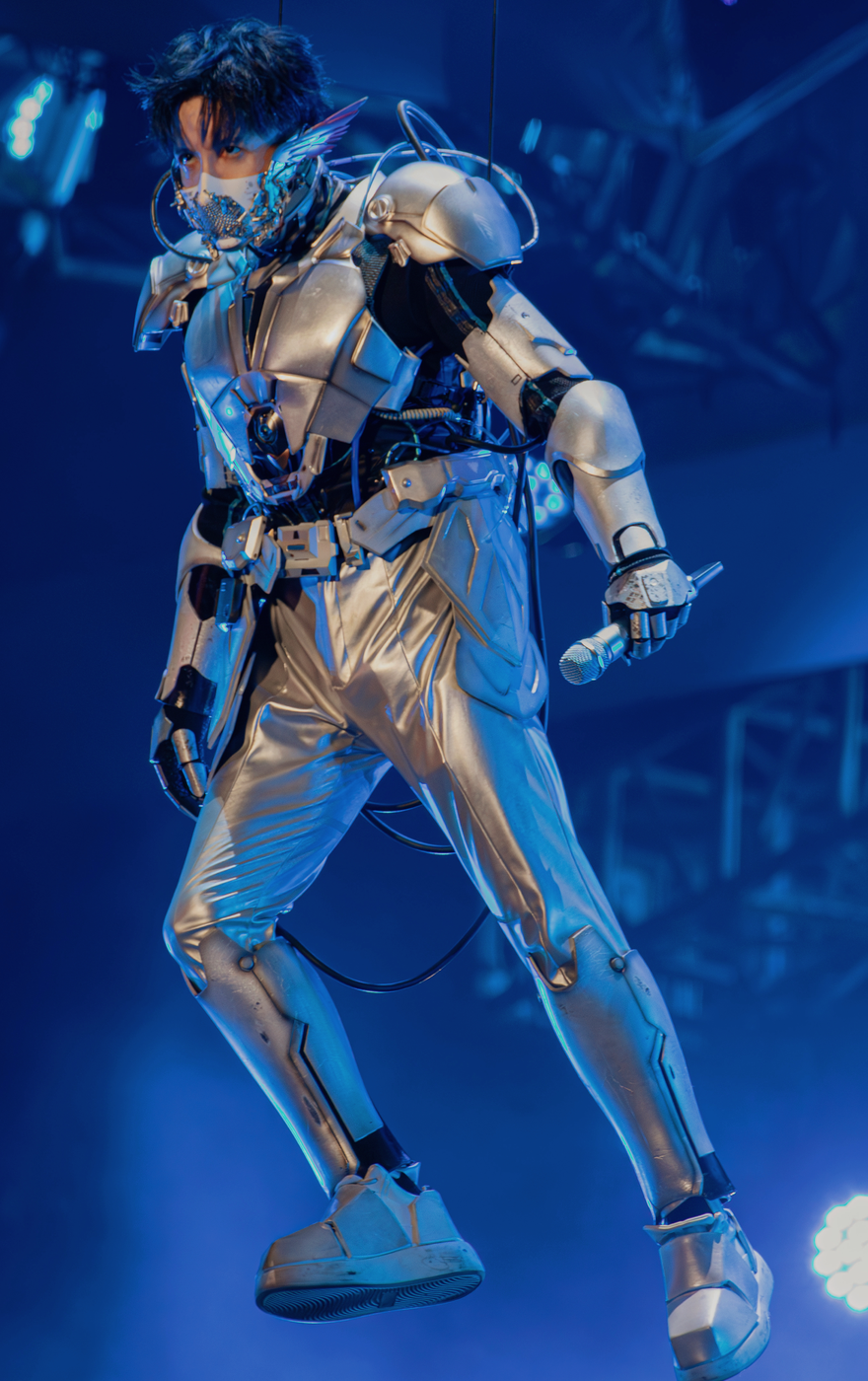
- Xue in August 2024, Extraterrestrial World Tour
- Concert tours: 3
- One-off concerts: 1
- Online concerts: 1
- Music festivals: 50

Chinese singer-songwriter Joker Xue held his first concert in 2008 in Shanghai. Since 2017, he has headlined three tours for a total of 173 shows. His first tour, I Think I've Seen You Somewhere, was based in China. He expanded the scope for his second and third tours, Skyscraper World Tour and Extraterrestrial World Tour, to include stops in other Asian countries and cities in North America, Europe, Australia.

Xue holds several tour records, all accomplished during his Extraterrestrial World Tour which ranks among the list of most-attended concert tours with 5.08 million tickets sold. He is one of five Chinese artists who have held more than 100 concerts in a single tour and the only Chinese artist to have held more than 100 stadium concerts in a single tour, a significant milestone as stadiums have much larger capacity compared to arenas and demand more of the artist's performance, tour equipment, and ticket sales. In October 2024, Xue extended the Extraterrestrial World Tour with overseas encore stadium shows, becoming the first mainland China artist to hold an international stadium tour.

He also holds numerous venue records as the first artist to perform at many stadiums in China, due to his willingness to travel to second- and third-tier cities (as categorized by Chinese city tier system) and his widespread fanbase. He also holds several records as the first mainland China artist to perform at various stadiums and arenas overseas, notably the first to perform two consecutive concerts at Singapore National Stadium after his first show sold out.

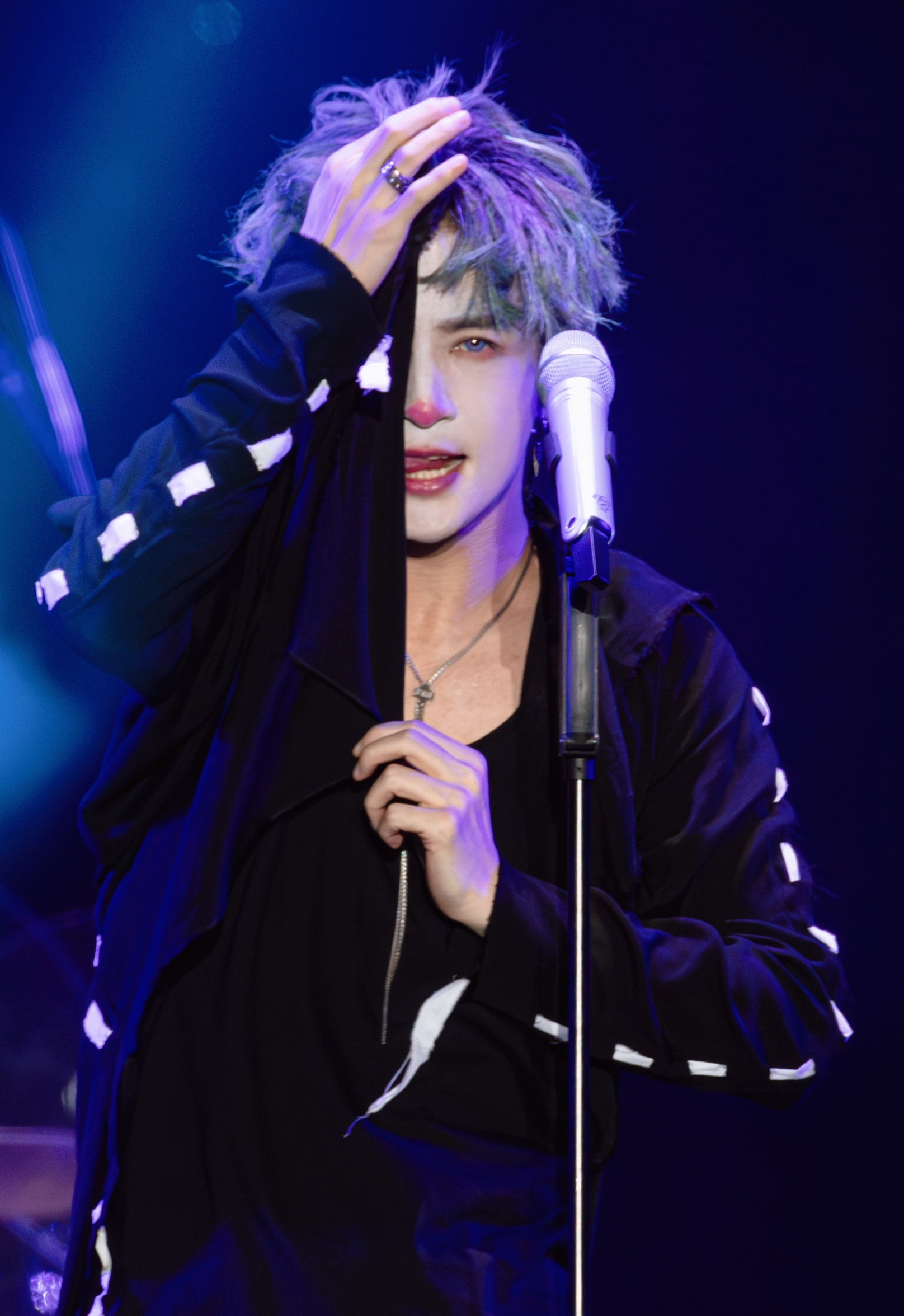
Xue in October 2023, Joker No.15

Both of his world tours received positive reviews from The Straits Times. Of the Skyscraper World Tour, Xue's voice "smouldered at its lower end and shimmered in its higher register" and he was able to "play up the drama in performance without being showy." Of the Extraterrestrial World Tour's three shows at the Singapore Indoor Stadium and two encore shows Singapore National Stadium, Xue's voice "rang with a pleading intensity perfect for the grand anthems he is known for" and "his authenticity, spontaneity and the fact that he can sing" being the highlights of his shows.

In addition to concert tours, Xue has also performed at 50 music festivals as of May 2025. In 2021, he adopted the stage persona "Joker" for music festivals and maintained it since. During the 2025 Labor Day Golden Week, Xue headlined five music festivals consecutively from May 1–5. The fifth one was the first show of the newly-established New Bee Music Festival, produced in part by Xue's company Chaoshi Music.

Xue has also performed at special events and award shows. Most notably, he performed "Fang's Words" at the 2025 CMG New Year's Gala as the only male singer to have a solo stage.

== Concert tours ==
Title	Date(s)	Associated album(s)	Continent(s)	Shows	Attendance	Ref.
I Think I've Seen You Somewhere Tour	April 22, 2017 – July 22, 2017	An Unexpected Journey; Beginner	Asia	10	100,000	
Skyscraper World Tour	July 14, 2018 – May 19, 2019	The Crossing; Freak	Asia; Europe; Oceania; North America	23	400,000	
Extraterrestrial World Tour	October 23, 2021 – February 15, 2025	Extraterrestrial; The Guardian	Asia; Europe; Oceania; North America	145	5,080,000	
The King of Beasts Tour	2026 –		Asia	54 (as of June 2026)		

== One-off concerts ==
Event name	Date	Associated album(s)	City	Country	Venue	Attendance	Ref.
Live Concert in Shanghai	December 20, 2008	Jacky; How Are You? Deeply Loved You	Shanghai	China	Shanghai International Gymnastic Center	5,000	

== Online concerts ==
Event name	Date	Associated album(s)	City	Country	Platform	Attendance	Ref.
Dust in the World Online Concert	May 23, 2020	Dust	Beijing	China	Xiaodu	3,389,500	
Douyin Online Concert: Ke	February 3, 2023	Countless	Beijing	China	Douyin	36,271,000	

== Music festivals ==
List of festival performances, showing dates, locations, and performed songs
Event	Date	Location	Performed song(s)	Notes	Ref.
Shanghai Echo Music Festival 上海echo音乐节	August 14, 2016	Shanghai	"Beginner", "Ugly", "Actor"	First music festival performance	
Chrome Hearts Magic Life Carnival 克罗心魔途生活嘉年华	September 24, 2016	Shanghai	"Ugly", "Just Right", "I Think I've Seen You Somewhere", "Actor"	—	
Rye Music Festival 麦田音乐节	September 23, 2018	Beijing	"Skyscraper", "Ugly","Wake Up", "An Unexpected Journey", "Hand Behind the Back", "Freak"	—	
InMusic Festival 草原音乐节	July 27, 2019	Zhangbei	"An Unexpected Journey", "Ugly", "Skyscraper", "Camel", "Freak", "Puppet" "Actor", "Forsaken Youth"	—	
Midou Music Festival 咪豆音乐节	September 14, 2019	Nanjing	"Skyscraper", "Ugly", "Camel" "Actor", "Puppet" "Half A Beat Slower", "An Unexpected Journey"	—	
Rye Music Festival 麦田音乐节	October 20, 2019	Fuxian Lake	"An Unexpected Journey" "Half A Beat Slower", "Like the Wind" "Actor", "Mocking", "I Think I've Seen You Somewhere", "Skyscraper"	—	
Rye Music Festival 麦田音乐节	November 2, 2019	Shanghai	"An Unexpected Journey" "Half A Beat Slower", "Animal World", "Like the Wind", "Talent", "Morbid State", "Forsaken Youth"	Joker No.1	
Rye Music Festival 麦田音乐节	September 19, 2020	Zibo	"An Unexpected Journey", "Ugly" "Actor", "Extraterrestrial", "Like the Wind", "The Crossing", "Accompany You to Wander", "Forsaken Youth"	—	
Luoyang Dream Chasing Music Carnival 洛阳追梦音乐嘉年华	May 3, 2021	Luoyang	"An Unexpected Journey", "I Think I've Seen You Somewhere", "Actor", "Puppet", "Camel", "Extraterrestrial", "Forsaken Youth"	Joker No.2	
Yuntaishan Music Festival 云台山音乐节	May 4, 2021	Yuntai Mountain	"An Unexpected Journey", "Extraterrestrial", "Actor", "Ambition", "Like the Wind", "Animal World", "Ugly"	Joker No.3	
Blooming Beauty Music Festival 花海美妆音乐节	May 22, 2021	Shanghai	"Skyscraper", "Actor", "Extraterrestrial", "Like the Wind", "Accompany You to Wander", "Camel", "Forsaken Youth"	Joker No.4	
To Young Music Festival 造氧音乐节	May 23, 2021	Zhengzhou	"The Crossing", "Freak", "Extraterrestrial", "Serious Snow", "Skyscraper", "Accompany You to Wander", "Forsaken Youth"	Joker No.5	
Rye Music Festival 麦田音乐节	June 12, 2021	Qingdao	"Skyscraper", "Freak", "Extraterrestrial", "Actor", "Ambition", "Accompany You to Wander", "Half a Beat Slower"	Joker No.6	
Chaole Music Festival 超乐音乐节	July 24, 2021	Chengdu	"An Unexpected Journey", "Actor", "Extraterrestrial", "Half", "Like the Wind", "Accompany You to Wander", "Forsaken Youth"	—	
C-Loud Music Carnival 大鹏音乐嘉年华	October 16, 2021	Shenzhen	"An Unexpected Journey", "Camel", "Actor", "Animal World", "Accompany You to Wander", "The Best", "Forsaken Youth"	—	
Rye Music Festival 麦田音乐节	October 17, 2021	Beijing	"An Unexpected Journey", "Camel", "Freak", "Accompany You to Wander", "Like the Wind", "Puppet", "Forsaken Youth"	—	
Manghe Music Festival 芒禾音乐节	August 7, 2022	Taizhou	"An Unexpected Journey", "Animal World", "Actor", "Extraterrestrial", "Like the Wind", "What Do You Want from Me", "Forsaken Youth"	—	
Qingzao Music Festival 青燥音乐节	March 25, 2023	Wuyuan	"Freak", "Animal World", "Lottery Ticket", "Accompany You to Wander", "Like the Wind", "Countless", "Forsaken Youth"	Joker No.7	
Taihu Bay Music Festival 太湖湾音乐节	April 30, 2023	Changzhou	"An Unexpected Journey", "Ambition", "Animal World", "Actor", "Puppet", "Countless", "Forsaken Youth"	Joker No.8	
The Restless Music Festival 魔都制躁音乐节	May 1, 2023	Shanghai	"An Unexpected Journey", "Camel", "Accompany You to Wander", "Like the Wind", "Youth of Galaxy", "Countless", "Forsaken Youth"	Joker No.9	
Frenzy Motorcycle Music Festival 狂潮机车音乐嘉年华	May 2, 2023	Handan	"An Unexpected Journey", "Freak", "Actor", "Youth of Galaxy", "Like the Wind", "Countless", "Accompany You to Wander"	Joker No.10	
Xizhi Begonia Music Festival 羲之海棠音乐节	June 24, 2023	Linyi	"An Unexpected Journey", "Freak", "Skyscraper", "Youth of Galaxy", "What Do You Want from Me", "Actor", "Like the Wind"	Joker No.11	
Eco Naobao Village Music Festival 生态恼包音乐节	July 30, 2023	Hohhot	"An Unexpected Journey", "Freak", "What Do You Want from Me", "Lottery Ticket", "Accompany You to Wander", "Skyscraper", "Forsaken Youth"	Joker No.12	
Ulanbah International Music Festival 乌兰布统国际音乐节	August 8, 2023	Chifeng	"The Crossing", "Freak", "An Unexpected Journey", "Lottery Ticket", "Animal World", "Camel", "Accompany You to Wander"	Joker No.13	
Parallel Space Music Carnival 平行时空音乐嘉年华	August 20, 2023	Urumqi	"An Unexpected Journey", "Freak", "Actor", "Lottery Ticket", "Animal World", "Like the Wind", "Forsaken Youth"	Joker No.14	
Love Forward Music Festival 贵阳爱未来音乐节	October 3, 2023	Guiyang	"An Unexpected Journey", "Freak", "Actor", "Lottery Ticket", "What Do You Want from Me", "Accompany You to Wander", "Forsaken Youth"	Joker No.15	
Huaian Dragon Palace Music Festival 淮安龙宫音乐节	October 22, 2023	Huaian	"An Unexpected Journey", "Freak", "Lottery Ticket", "What Do You Want from Me", "Ambition", "Accompany You to Wander", "Forsaken Youth"	Joker No.16	
Sanhewan Music Festival 泰州三河湾公园音乐节	October 29, 2023	Taizhou	"An Unexpected Journey", "Skyscraper", "Actor", "Lottery Ticket", "Camel", "Accompany You to Wander", "Forsaken Youth"	Joker No.17	
Yangma Island Music Festival 养马岛音乐节	August 25, 2024	Yantai	"An Unexpected Journey", "Freak", "Lottery Ticket", "Puppet", "Accompany You to Wander", "The Guardian", "Forsaken Youth"	Joker No.18	
Thai Hi Peak Music Festival 泰嗨巅峰音乐节	September 7, 2024	Chengdu	"An Unexpected Journey", "Freak", "Ugly", "Lottery Ticket", "Camel", "Countless", "The Guardian", "Forsaken Youth"	Joker No.19	
Wilderness Music Festival 旷野音乐节	September 8, 2024	Beijing	"An Unexpected Journey", "Animal World", "Freak", "Lottery Ticket", "Like the Wind", "The Guardian", "Forsaken Youth"	Joker No.20	
Galaxy Left Bank Music Festival 银河左岸音乐节	September 16, 2024	Changchun	"An Unexpected Journey", "Freak", "Ugly", "Lottery Ticket", "The Guardian", "Accompany You to Wander", "Forsaken Youth"	Joker No.21	
Zebra Music Festival 斑马音乐节	September 22, 2024	Fuyang	"An Unexpected Journey", "Ugly", "Skyscraper", "Lottery Ticket", "Freak", "The Guardian", "Forsaken Youth"	Joker No.22	
Dalu Youth Music Festival 大麓青年音乐节	October 1, 2024	Wenzhou	"An Unexpected Journey", "Animal World", "Lottery Ticket", "The Guardian", "Accompany You to Wander", "Like the Wind", "Forsaken Youth"	Joker No.23	
Langya Guochao Music Festival 琅琊国潮音乐节	October 3, 2024	Linyi	"An Unexpected Journey", "Freak", "Skyscraper", "Lottery Ticket", "Ambition", "Actor", "Forsaken Youth"	Joker No.24	
Taihu Bay Music Festival 太湖湾音乐节	October 5, 2024	Changzhou	"An Unexpected Journey", "Accompany You to Wander", "Lottery Ticket", "Camel", "Countless", "The Guardian", "Forsaken Youth"	Joker No.25	
One Love Asia Music Festival; One Love Asia 音乐节	October 20, 2024	Singapore	"An Unexpected Journey", "Freak", "Animal World", "Camel", "Like the Wind", "Accompany You to Wander", "Forsaken Youth"	Joker No.26	
Galaxy Left Bank Nantong Zilang Music Festival 银河左岸 南通紫琅音乐节	October 26, 2024	Nantong	"An Unexpected Journey", "Freak", "Like the Wind", "Lottery Ticket", "Camel", "The Guardian", "Forsaken Youth"	Joker No.27	
E-Tribe Music Festival 娱乐e族音乐节	October 27, 2024	Wuhan	"An Unexpected Journey", "Skyscraper", "Lottery Ticket", "Adoration", "Accompany You to Wander", "The Guardian", "Forsaken Youth"	Joker No.28	
Galaxy Left Bank Luoma Lake Music Festival 银河左岸 骆马湖音乐节	November 3, 2024	Suqian	"An Unexpected Journey", "Ugly", "Like the Wind", "Lottery Ticket", "Camel", "The Guardian", "Forsaken Youth"	Joker No.29	
Guochao Music Festival 国潮音乐节	November 9, 2024	Fuzhou	"An Unexpected Journey", "Freak", "Lottery Ticket", "Ugly", "Like the Wind", "The Guardian", "Forsaken Youth"	Joker No.30	
Flow Gourd Music Festival 葫芦果音乐节	November 10, 2024	Wuhu	"An Unexpected Journey", "Animal World", "Countless", "Lottery Ticket", "Adoration", "The Guardian", "Forsaken Youth"	Joker No.31	
Fuyaozhishang Music Carnival 扶摇直上音乐嘉年华	November 16, 2024	Ganzhou	"An Unexpected Journey", "Ugly", "Lottery Ticket", "Like the Wind", "That Day On the Road of No Return", "The Guardian", "Forsaken Youth"	Joker No.32	
Feitianshan Music Festival 飞天山音乐节	November 17, 2024	Chenzhou	"An Unexpected Journey", "Animal World", "Lottery Ticket", "Adoration", "That Day On the Road of No Return", "Accompany You to Wander", "Forsaken Youth"	Joker No.33	
Z Era Music Festival; Z纪元音乐节	December 8, 2024	Nanning	"An Unexpected Journey", "Freak", "Lottery Ticket", "Like the Wind", "That Day On the Road of No Return", "The Guardian", "Forsaken Youth"	Joker No.34	
SuperLive Dinghushan Music Carnival; SuperLive鼎湖山音乐嘉年华	December 15, 2024	Zhaoqing	"An Unexpected Journey", "Freak", "Lottery Ticket", "Adoration", "That Day On the Road of No Return", "The Guardian", "Forsaken Youth"	Joker No.35	
Midou Music Festival 咪豆音乐节	May 1, 2025	Nanjing	"An Unexpected Journey", "Freak", "Lottery Ticket", "Rent Purchase", "That Day On the Road of No Return", "The Guardian", "Forsaken Youth"	Joker No.36	
Taihu Bay Music Festival 太湖湾音乐节	May 2, 2025	Changzhou	"An Unexpected Journey", "Freak", "Like the Wind", "Youth of Galaxy", "That Day On the Road of No Return", "The Guardian", "Accompany You to Wander"	Joker No.37	
Tianjin Bubble Island Music Festival 天津泡泡岛音乐节	May 3, 2025	Tianjin	"An Unexpected Journey", "Freak", "Lottery Ticket", "Like the Wind", "That Day On the Road of No Return", "The Guardian", "Accompany You to Wander"	Joker No.38	
Galaxy Left Bank Foshan Music Festival 佛山银河左岸音乐节	May 4, 2025	Foshan	"An Unexpected Journey", "Freak", "Rent Purchase", "Ambition", "That Day On the Road of No Return", "The Guardian", "Accompany You to Wander"	Joker No.39	
New Bee Music Festival 新蜂音乐节	May 5, 2025	Quzhou	"An Unexpected Journey", "Animal World", "Lottery Ticket", "Camel", "Like the Wind", "The Guardian", "Accompany You to Wander", "Forsaken Youth"	Joker No.40	
New Bee Music Festival 新蜂音乐节	July 5, 2025	Chengdu	"Extraterrestrial", "Rent Purchase", "Lottery Ticket", "Half", "Like the Wind", "Actually", "Accompany You to Wander"	As Xue Zhiqian	
New Bee Music Festival 新蜂音乐节	July 6, 2025	Chengdu	"An Unexpected Journey", "Freak", "Youth of Galaxy", "That Day On the Road of No Return", "Animal World", "The Guardian", "Forsaken Youth"	Joker No.41	
Midou Music Festival 咪豆左岸音乐节	October 1, 2025	Nanjing	"Extraterrestrial", "Adoration", "Lottery Ticket", "An Unexpected Journey", "Rent or Purchase", "Half", "Actor"	—	
Midou Music Festival 咪豆左岸音乐节	October 2, 2025	Nanjing	"Axe Trick", "Animal World", "Youth of Galaxy", "Countless", "AI", "Ugly", "Camel", "Forsaken Youth"	Joker No.42	
Taihu Bay Music Festival 太湖湾音乐节	October 3	Changzhou	"Extraterrestrial", "I Think I've Seen You Somewhere", "Lottery Ticket", "Rent or Purchase", "Actor", "Like the Wind", "Accompany You to Wander"	—	
Taihu Bay Music Festival 太湖湾音乐节	October 4	Changzhou	"The Crossing", "Animal World", "Leap", "Youth of Galaxy", "Puppet", "The Guardian", "That Day On the Road of No Return", "Forsaken Youth"	Joker No.43	
Zebra Music Festival 斑马音乐节	October 6	Fuyang	"Ugly", "Animal World", "Lottery Ticket", "Leap", "The Guardian", "Accompany You to Wander", "Forsaken Youth"	Joker No.44	
Galaxy Left Bank Music Festival 银河左岸音乐节	October 7	Luzhou	"Axe Trick", "Animal World", "Lottery Ticket", "That Day On the Road of No Return", "An Unexpected Journey", "Countless", "Accompany You to Wander"	Joker No.45	
Guochao Music Festival 国潮音乐嘉年华	October 8, 2025	Xiangyang	"An Unexpected Journey", "Animal World", "Youth of Galaxy", "Leap", "Freak", "The Guardian", "Forsaken Youth"	Joker No.46	
Storm Electronic Music Festival	January 1, 2026	Guangzhou	"Axe Trick", "The Crossing", "Relieve Boredom", "Frank", "That Day On the Road of No Return", "Extraterrestrial"	Joker No.47	

== Special events ==
List of special events with dates, locations, and performed songs
Event	Date	Location	Performed song(s)	Ref.
2016 Tmall Double 11 Carnival; 2016 天猫双11狂欢夜	November 10, 2016	Shenzhen Universiade Sports Centre	"Beginner"	
2017 Jiangsu TV New Year's Eve Concert; 2017 江苏卫视跨年演唱会	December 31, 2016	Venetian Arena	"Slowly" (cover of the song by Jacky Cheung, performed with Tan Jing), "Actor", "Just Right"	
2017 Anhui TV Spring Festival Gala 安徽卫视春晚	January 25, 2017	Hefei	"Actor", "Ugly"	
2018 Jiangsu TV New Year's Eve Concert; 2018 江苏卫视跨年演唱会	December 31, 2017	Guangzhou International Sports Arena	"Animal World", "Beginner", "It's Raining" (performed with Mao Buyi), "Drink Sorrow Down" (cover of the song by Mao Buyi, performed with Mao Buyi)	
2018 Liaoning TV Spring Festival Gala 辽宁卫视春晚	February 14, 2018	Shenyang	"Radius Around You"	
2018 Jiangsu TV Spring Festival Gala for the Year of the Dog 江苏卫视狗年春晚	February 17, 2018	—	"Camel"	
2018 Jiangsu TV Lantern Festival Gala 江苏卫视元宵晚会	March 2, 2018	—	"Ambiguous"	
2019 Jiangsu TV New Year's Eve Concert; 2019 江苏卫视跨年演唱会	December 31, 2018	Venetian Arena	"Forsaken Youth", "Ambiguous", "Da La Beng Ba"(cover of the song by Luo Tianyi, performed with Luo Tianyi)	
Happy New Year from East to West, North to South 东西南北贺新春	February 3, 2019	Meishan	"Camel", "Talent"	
World Police and Fire Games 世界警察和消防员运动会	June 29, 2019	Chengdu	"Skyscraper", "Animal World", "Actor"	
REAL ME Call Night Music Festival; REALME來電之夜音樂盛典	July 20, 2019	Nanjing Olympic Sports Centre	"Talent", "Freak", "Forsaken Youth"	
Infinite Love Stars Gala Concert 宠爱无限群星盛典演唱会	August 8, 2019	Mercedes-Benz Arena (Shanghai)	"Puppet", "Like the Wind", "Actor"	
Juhuasuan 99 Festival 聚划算99盛典	September 8, 2019	—	"I Think I've Seen You Somewhere", "Half a Beat Slower"	
Sanya Stars Concert 三亚群星演唱会	September 24, 2019	Sanya	"Puppet", "Like the Wind", "What Do You Want from Me"	
Magic Park Night Star Concert 魔力PARK之夜群星演唱会	October 13, 2019	Changchun Stadium	"Puppet", "Actor", "Forsaken Youth"	
Douyin Wonderful Magical Night 抖音美好奇妙夜	October 19, 2019	Guangzhou	"Half a Beat Slower"	
2019 Mageline Annual Gala Concert 麦吉丽品牌2019年会盛典明星演唱会	December 21, 2019	Haixia Olympic Center	"Animal World", "Mocking", "Actor"	
Baidu Boiling Point Concert 百度沸点音乐会	December 22, 2019	Hefei Olympic Sports Center Stadium	"An Unexpected Journey", "I Think I've Seen You Somewhere", "Like the Wind", "Morbid State", "Skyscraper", "Actor", "Mocking", "Half a Beat Slower"	
2020 Jiangsu TV New Year's Eve Concert; 2020 江苏卫视跨年演唱会	December 31, 2019	Venetian Arena	"Half a Beat Slower", "Actor" and "Serious Snow" Duet (performed with a virtual version of himself), "Classic Anime Theme Songs Medley" (Black Cat Detective, Shuke and Beita, The Smurfs, Doraemon, Journey to the West: Legends of the Monkey King, The Adventures of the Sloppy King, and Slam Dunk)	
2020 Zhejiang Satellite TV Spring Festival Gala 浙江卫视春节联欢晚会	January 25, 2020	—	"Just Right"	
Zhejiang Satellite TV Super Show 浙江卫视超级秀	October 31, 2020	—	"Like the Wind", "Extraterrestrial"	
2021 Jiangsu TV New Year's Eve Concert; 2021 江苏卫视跨年演唱会	December 31, 2020	Venetian Arena	"15 Years of Hit Songs (medley of Xue Style Love Songs)" "Extraterrestrial"	
Bilibili Most Beautiful Night 哔哩哔哩最美的夜	December 31, 2021	Beijing	"Fox", "City of Luo"	
2022 Jiangsu TV New Year's Eve Concert; 2022 江苏卫视跨年演唱会	December 31, 2021	Venetian Arena	"Loess Plateau" (cover of the song by An Wen), "Like the Wind", "Turn Waste Into Treasure"	
2023 Jiangsu TV New Year's Eve Concert; 2023 江苏卫视跨年演唱会	December 31, 2022	Venetian Arena	"Warrior of the Darkness" (cover of the song by Eason Chan, performed with Jace Guo, Macau Children's Art Troupe and O-DOG Kids), "Countless", "What Do You Want from Me", "But" (performed with Jane Zhang)	
2024 Jiangsu TV New Year's Eve Concert; 2024 江苏卫视跨年演唱会	December 31, 2023	Venetian Arena	"Accompany You to Wander", "Creative Medley: Actor + Travel Around + Hero Song + Big Bridal Sedan", "Youth of Galaxy" (performed with Essay Wang), "Ugly"	
2025 Jiangsu TV New Year's Eve Concert; 2025 江苏卫视跨年演唱会	December 31, 2024	Venetian Arena	"Extraterrestrial" (performed with Wang Junkai), "Rent Purchase", "To Here" (cover of the song by Jace Guo, performed with Jace Guo), "DJ Remix Medley: I Think I've Seen You Somewhere + Ugly + Just Right"	
2025 CMG New Year's Gala; 2025 央视春晚	January 28, 2025	Beijing	"Fang's Words" (cover of the song by Zhao Yinjun)	
Bilibili Forever 22 Graduation Concert 哔哩哔哩永远22毕业歌会	June 2, 2025	Jiangwan Stadium	"Freak", "Forsaken Youth" (performed with Jace Guo), "Like the Wind"	
JD.com 11.11 Surprise Night 京东11.11惊喜之夜	November 11, 2025	Shanghai Indoor Stadium	"Lottery Ticket" (performed with Jace Guo), " "Serious Snow", "That Day On the Road of No Return"	
2026 Jiangsu TV New Year's Eve Concert; 2026 江苏卫视跨年演唱会	December 31, 2025	Venetian Arena	"Ugly", "Freak", "An Unexpected Journey", "Farmers and the Land", "That Day On the Road of No Return", "The Guardian"	

== Award shows ==
List of performances at award shows, with the location and performed songs
Event	Date	Location	Performed song(s)	Ref.
Asian Music Gala 亞洲金曲大賞	July 19, 2017	Guangzhou International Sports Arena	"Animal World", "Actor" (performed with Hebe Tien), "A Little Happiness" (cover of the song by Hebe Tien, performed with Hebe Tien)	
12th Migu Music Awards 第十二屆音乐盛典咪咕汇	December 8, 2018	Shanghai	"Like the Wind", "Camel", "Forsaken Youth"	
13th Migu Music Awards 第十三屆音乐盛典咪咕汇	December 14, 2019	Guangzhou International Sports Arena	"Fox", "Puppet", "It's Been So Long", "Half a Beat Slower"	

== Guest appearances ==
List of concert appearances as featured act, showing main artist, dates, locations, and performed songs
Event	Artist	Date	Location	Performed song(s)	Ref.
The Best of the World, Let's Have a Blast Concert Tour 人间精品起来嗨巡回演唱会	Wowkie Zhang	February 18, 2017	Guangzhou	"Ugly"	
Return to Tomorrow Concert Tour 回到明天巡回演唱会	Zhao Yingjun	December 12, 2017	Beijing	"Actor"	
Treasure Hunting Concert Tour 寻宝游戏巡回演唱会	Xu Song	July 6, 2019	Beijing	"Best Singer" (performed with Xu Song), "Actor" (performed with Xu Song), "Puppet"	
Breathing Wilderness Tour 呼吸之野巡回演唱会	Xu Song	August 31, 2024	Shanghai	"Poil de Carotte" (performed with Xu Song), "Freak" (performed with Xu Song), "Like the Wind"	
Light World Tour 光巡回演唱会	Jane Zhang	December 14, 2024	Chengdu	"Farewell My Concubine" (performed with Jane Zhang), "Rent Purchase"	
Lil Sis Concert Tour 纯妹妹巡回演唱会	Shan Yichun	February 28, 2025	Nanjing	"Like the Wind" (performed with Shan Yichun), "That Day On The Road of No Return"	
I Want To Become You Concert Tour 我想成为你巡回演唱会	Han Hong	April 26, 2025	Chengdu	"Actor" (performed with Han Hong), "Small Sharp Point" (performed with Han Hong), "Rent Purchase"	
Under Universe Concert Tour 宇宙超级无敌大狂欢巡回演唱会	Roy Wang	July 12, 2025	Hangzhou	"Like the Wind" (performed with Roy Wang), "Tardy"	
Dream of Love Concert Tour (爱之梦演奏会)	Lang Lang	August 29, 2025	Zhengzhou	"The Best"	
Mad Love 2.0 Concert Tour (狂爱2.0巡回演唱会)	Will Pan	August 31, 2025	Shanghai	"Forget to Embrace" (cover of the song by Will Pan, performed with Will Pan), "Puppet"	
Insisting on Singing Concert Tour (非要唱巡回演唱会)	Yue Yunpeng	October 12-13, 2025	Zhengzhou	"Rent or Purchase", "That Day On the Road of No Return"	
