= Anhui Jianzhu University =

Provincial public university in Hefei, Anhui, China

- 安徽建筑大学
- Type: Public
- Established: 1958
- Undergraduates: 20,000
- Postgraduates: 1,000
- Location: Hefei, Anhui, China; 31.74404°N 117.22368°E
- Campus: Urban
- Website: ahjzu.edu.cn
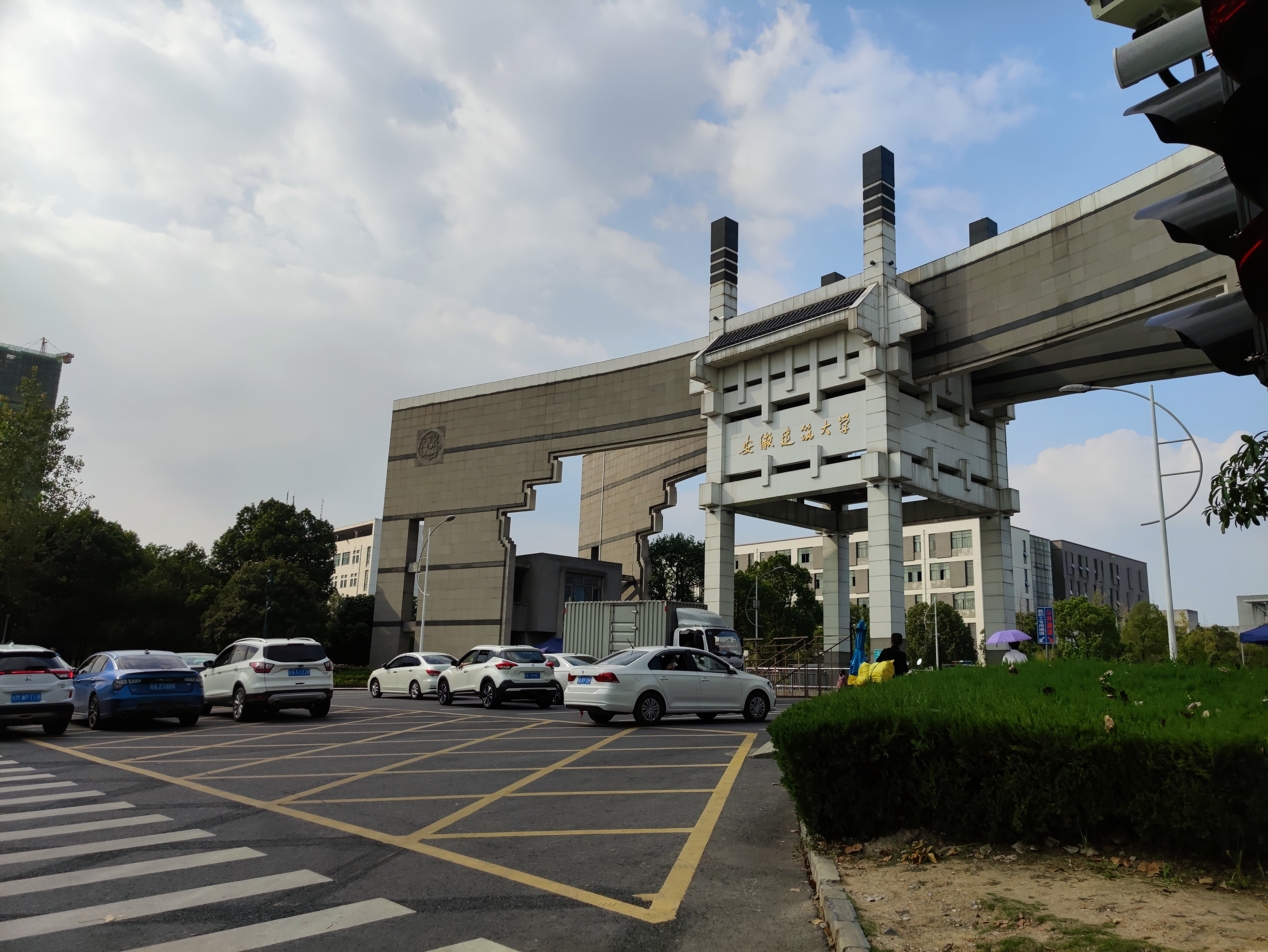

Anhui Jianzhu University (AHJZU, Chinese: 安徽建筑大学; pinyin: Ānhuī jiànzhù dàxué; lit. 'Anhui Architecture University') is a provincial public university in Hefei, Anhui, China. It is affiliated with the Anhui Provincial Government, and co-sponsored by the Anhui Provincial Government and the Ministry of Housing and Urban-Rural Development.

The university has 14 teaching departments (schools), There are now 50 undergraduate majors, covering seven disciplines including engineering, management, science, art, literature, law, and economics.

== History ==
Anhui Jianzhu University was founded in 1958.

In September 1958, in support of Anhui province, 324 teachers and students of Suzhou Construction Engineering School and four teachers from Shenyang Planned Economy School came to Hefei. Jointly with 179 teachers and students in the cadre training class of the Anhui Provincial Construction Department, the Anhui Construction Engineering School was formed in DongChenGang of Hefei city.

In September 1960, the department of civil engineering of Hefei University of Technology was incorporated into the school, and the Anhui Institute of Architecture and Industry was founded.

In 1961, Anhui Institute of Architecture and Industry was revoked, and Anhui Construction Engineering School was reserved. In August 1964, Anhui Construction Engineering School moved to Lingdatang, Hefei. In 1971, the school moved to Jinzhai Road.

In March 1983, the construction branch of Hefei University of Technology was established. On 30 December 1986, Anhui Institute of Architecture and Industry was restored.

In 2003, a new campus was built in the Hefei Economic & Technological Development Area (HETDA). In 2013, Anhui Institute of Architecture and Industry was renamed Anhui Jianzhu University.

== Schools ==
- School of Architecture & Urban Planning
- School of Arts
- School of Civil Engineering
- School of Continuing Education
- School of Environment & Enengy Engineering
- School of Economics & Management
- School of Electronic & Information Engineering
- School of Foreign Languages
- School of Materials & Chemical Engineering
- School of Mathematics & Physics
- School of Mechanical & Electrical Engineering
- School of Marxism
- School of Public Administration

== Research ==
AHJZU has eight provincial key disciplines, one national engineering laboratory, four provincial key laboratories, and 10 national and provincial engineering (technology) research centers.
