= Pan Fusheng (engineer) =

Chinese engineer

- 潘复生
- Born: 30 July 1962 (age 64); Lanxi County, Zhejiang, China
- Education: Hefei University of Technology; Chongqing University; Northwestern Polytechnical University
- Scientific career
- Fields: Light metal
- Workplaces: Chongqing University
- Doctoral advisor: Ding Peidao (丁培道)

Chinese name
- Simplified Chinese: 潘复生
- Traditional Chinese: 潘復生
Transcriptions
Standard Mandarin
- Hanyu Pinyin: Pān Fùshēng

Pan Fusheng (born 30 July 1962) is a Chinese engineer who is a professor at Chongqing University, and an academician of the Chinese Academy of Engineering. He was a delegate to the 10th National People's Congress and is a delegate to the 13th National People's Congress. He was a member of the 9th, 11th and 12th National Committee of the Chinese People's Political Consultative Conference.

== Biography ==
Pan was born in Lanxi County, Zhejiang, on 30 July 1962. After graduating from Huangdian High School (黄店中学) in 1977, he taught at schools in his hometown. In 1978, he enrolled at Hefei University of Technology, graduating in 1982 with a bachelor's degree in powder metallurgy. He went on to receive his Master of Engineering degree at Chongqing University in 1985. He also obtained his doctor's degree from Northwestern Polytechnical University in material science and engineering in 1994.

Pan was recruited by Chongqing University in 1985, what he was promoted to instructor in 1987 and associate professor in 1989. In 1992, at the age of 30, he was promoted to full professor, becoming the youngest professor in the history of Chongqing University. From October 1991 to March 1993, he was a visiting scholar at Oxford University. He returned to China in 1993 and continued to teach at the Chongqing University. That same year, he joined the Jiusan Society. He was honored as a Distinguished Young Scholar by the National Science Fund for Distinguished Young Scholars in 2007. In October 2008, he was appointed president of Chongqing Academy of Science and Technology, and served until 4 January 2019. In December 2017, he was proposed as president of Chongqing Association for Science and Technology.

== Honours and awards ==
- 2004 State Science and Technology Progress Award (Second Class) for the research and industrialization of high quality aluminium foil wool and aluminium foil products for packaging.
- 2008 Science and Technology Innovation Award of the Ho Leung Ho Lee Foundation
- 2011 State Science and Technology Progress Award (Second Class) for the application technology of integration and circulation of high quality magnesium alloy.
- 2015 Fellow of the Russian Academy of Mining Sciences
- 2017 Fellow of the Asian Pacific Academy of Materials
- 27 November 2017 Member of the Chinese Academy of Engineering (CAE)
