= Xu Song (singer) =

Chinese singer and musician (born 1986)

- 许嵩
- Born: 14 May 1986 (age 40); Hefei, Anhui, China
- Other name: Vae
- Years active: 2006–present

Xu Song
- Traditional Chinese: 許嵩
- Simplified Chinese: 许嵩
Transcriptions
Standard Mandarin
- Hanyu Pinyin: Xǔ Sōng

Xu Song (Chinese: 许嵩; born 14 May 1986), also known as "Vae" in English, is a Chinese singer, songwriter, producer, writer, and music director. He has released 8 albums.

== Early life ==
Xu was born in Hefei, Anhui, China, on 14 May 1986. His father was once a dulcimer, so Xu Song had early exposure to music. After the influence of his father, Xu Song became more interested in folk music. He started pursuing music while attending Anhui Medical University, where he studied management and graduated from in 2008.

== Music career ==
=== 2006-2010: Personalized and Sought and Got ===
In the early days before his style was established, Xu uploaded covers of Jay Chou's songs. Because of the similarity in tone and singing style, he was once called "Little Jay Chou". He began uploading original songs online in 2006 under the pseudonym Vae. "Moth" (飞蛾) was downloaded more than 70,000 times after its release. "Funeral for Roses" (玫瑰花的葬礼) was particularly well received by critics and listeners. In December 2006, he was invited by Lenovo to create a song ahead of the release of their new cell phone and wrote "Pink Letterhead" (粉色信笺) as a result. In 2007, he released "Andersen Has No Regrets" (安徒生不后悔) following a swath of malicious comments online.

After graduating from college in 2008, Xu spent about half a year creating his first album Personalize (自定义) which was released on January 10, 2009, with Xu credited as the composer, lyricist, and producer on all nine songs. The album, with songs such as "Why Not" (有何不可), "Bad Kid" (坏孩子), "Shrewdness" (城府), "Excessive Explanations" (多余的解释), ranked 6th among QQ Music's 2009 top ten albums by mainland China artists.

Xu released his second album Sought and Got (寻雾启示) on January 6, 2010, and was credited as the composer, lyricist, and producer on all songs. The song "Luzhou Moon" (庐州月) was ranked 2nd on the Internet Original Music Popularity Chart.

=== 2011-2013: Socra Without Tes and Wonderland ===
In March 2011, Xu signed with Ocean Butterflies. Xu released Socra Without Tes (苏格拉没有底) on April 1, 2011; the single "In Imagination" (想象之中) earned more than 1 million listens on the first day of release. The album was ranked first on the 9th Asia Pacific Music Chart awards. That same year, he held his first concert on October 25 at Beijing Exhibition Center.

In July 2012, Xu released Wonderland (梦游计), the concept for the album came from a dream. In January 2013, Xu served as the image ambassador of the first Shanghai University Student Original Music Competition, sponsored by Shanghai Municipal Government and Shanghai Municipal Education Commission. March 30, Xu won the award for Best Singer-Songwriter at the 20th Chinese Top Ten Music Awards In August, Xu published his first book, a photography essay collection Sea Spiritual Light (海上灵光) with nearly 200 photos documenting Xu's travels in Greece, interspersed with his personal reflections.

From April 2012 to October 2013, Xu embarked on his first concert tour "Xu Song and His Friends" with 3 shows in Nanjing, Beijing, and Wuhan. The Hefei show, scheduled for September 29, was cancelled due to various environmental factors.

=== 2014-2017: Go Drink Tea and Youth Evening Paper ===
On August 23, 2014, Xu released his fifth album Go Drink Tea (不如吃茶去). The title is a reference to the Zen koan "空持百千偈，不如吃茶去" meaning it's better to return to simplicity; instead of studying the art of Zen, why not go drink some tea. It's the way Xu lives his life. Musically, it features many traditional Chinese instruments such as guzheng, guqin, and erhu.

In January 2015, Xu wrote and composed the song "Swallows Return to Their Nests" (燕归巢), performed by Jane Zhang and Jason Zhang. It won Best Duet at the 15th Global Chinese Songs Ranking and Xu won Best Composer at the 23rd Chinese Top Ten Music Awards.

On June 28, 2016, Xu released his sixth album Youth Evening Paper (青年晚报). The song, "Appreciation of Both Refined and Popular Tastes" (雅俗共赏) was praised by critics and earned Xu the awards for Best Songwriter and Top 10 Songs of the Year at the 24th Chinese Top Ten Music Awards. In July, Xu supported the charity event "Moji 35 °C Project" (墨迹35 °C计划), to raise awareness about global warming.

In 2017, Xu embarked on his second tour, Youth Evening Paper, from March to October. The tour had four shows, starting in Shanghai (special guest: BY2), then Beijing (special guests: Stephy Qi and Luo Tianyi), then Nanjing (special guest: Dai Quan), and concluding in Guangzhou.

=== 2018-2021: Treasure Hunting and Breathing Wilderness ===
In 2018, Xu released his 7th album Treasure Hunting (寻宝游戏) on July 12. At the album release press conference, Xu announced that he has renewed his contract with Taihe Music Group.

In 2019, Xu embarked on his third tour, titled after the album, for a total of five shows from June to July. In 2020, Xu composed "A Warm Heart Equals the World" (心暖心等于世界), which was jointly produced and released by Taihe Music Group, Xinhua News Agency's "Voice in China", Beijing Municipal Press and Publication Bureau, Cultural Investment Holdings, and Douyin. It pays tribute to medical staff fighting the COVID-19 pandemic on the front line.

In 2021, Xu released his eighth album Breathing Wilderness (呼吸之野) on May 14, with "Raven" (乌鸦) as the lead single. In August, Xu made his first variety show appearance on the music-oriented The Next Banger (我的音樂你聽嗎) along with Penny Tai and Joker Xue. In December, Xu won Best Singer-Songwriter award and "Raven" was named one of the Top 10 Hits of the Year at Migu Music Awards.

=== 2022-Present: Recent activities ===
In 2022, Xu collaborated with Vincent Fang on the song "Snow on Paper" (纸上雪) which was part of the cultural program "Poetry and Painting of China" jointly launched by China Media Group, the Ministry of Culture and Tourism, the Palace Museum, Beijing Normal University, the Central Academy of Fine Arts, the National Art Museum of China. On January 21, 2023, Xu made his first appearance at CMG New Year's Gala and performed "In Tune" (合拍) with Jilin Singing & Dancing Troupe.

In 2024, Xu embarked on his four tour titled after his eighth album. The Breathing Wilderness Tour began in Wuhan on April 13. On October 26, Xu performed for the first time at the Beijing National Stadium to a crowd of 60,000 people. On December 31, Xu performed "Heart to Heart" (心有所向) at the CCTV New Year's Eve Gala, titled "Set Sail for 2025."

In 2025, Xu plans to continued the Breathing Wilderness Tour in Changsha on April 12 and more shows to come in Nanjing, Shenzhen, Huzhou, Xiamen, and Luoyang.

== Albums ==
- Personalize (January 10, 2009)
- Sought and Got (January 6, 2010)
- Socra Without Tes (April 1, 2011)
- Wonderland (July 11, 2012)
- Go Drink Tea (August 26, 2014)
- Youth Evening Paper (June 28, 2016)
- Treasure Hunting (July 12, 2018)
- Breathing Wilderness (May 14, 2021)

== Concert tours ==
- Socra Without Tes Concert (2011)
1. 2011-10-25, Beijing
- Xu Song and His Friends Concert Tour (2012-2013)
1. 2012-04-30, Nanjing
2. 2012-09-29, Hefei (cancelled)
3. 2012-11-25, Beijing
4. 2013-10-19, Wuhan
- Youth Evening Paper Concert Tour (2017)
1. 2017-03-18, Shanghai
2. 2017-07-15, Beijing
3. 2017-08-05, Ninjing
4. 2017-10-07, Guangzhou
- Treasure Hunting Concert Tour (2019)
1. 2019-6-1, Chengdu
2. 2019-6-8, Wuhan
3. 2019-6-22, Shanghai
4. 2019-7-6, Beijing
5. 2019-7-20, Hefei
- Breathing Wilderness Tour (2024)
1. 2024-4-13, Wuhan
2. 2024-4-27, Shenzhen
3. 2024-5-18, Hefei
4. 2024-6-1, Nanjing
5. 2024-6-15, Chengdu
6. 2024-6-29, Qingdao
7. 2024-8-3, Dalian
8. 2024-8-10, Hangzhou
9. 2024-8-17, Taiyuan
10. 2024-8-31, Shanghai
11. 2024-9-7, Zhengzhou
12. 2024-9-15, Chongqing
13. 2024-9-21, Nanchang
14. 2024-9-28, Wenzhou
15. 2024-10-4, Suzhou
16. 2024-10-6, Suzhou
17. 2024-10-13, Xi'An
18. 2024-10-26, Beijing
19. 2024-11-9, Haikou
20. 2024-11-16, Guiyang
21. 2024-11-23, Fuzhou
22. 2024-12-7, Fushan
23. 2024-12-21, Nanning
24. 2025-4-12, Changsha
