= Anhui Laomingguang Stadium =

Multi-use stadium in Hefei, Anhui, China

Coordinates: 31°51′19″N 117°17′24″E

The Anhui Laomingguang Stadium (Simplified Chinese: 安徽老明光体育场) or Anhui Provincial People's Stadium (Simplified Chinese: 安徽省人民体育场) is a multi-use stadium in Hefei, Anhui, China. It is currently used mostly for football matches and athletics events. The stadium has a capacity of 20,000 people. It is used primarily by Anhui Jiufang.
