= Hefei =

Capital of Anhui, China

Hefei 合肥市 Hofei
- Prefecture-level city
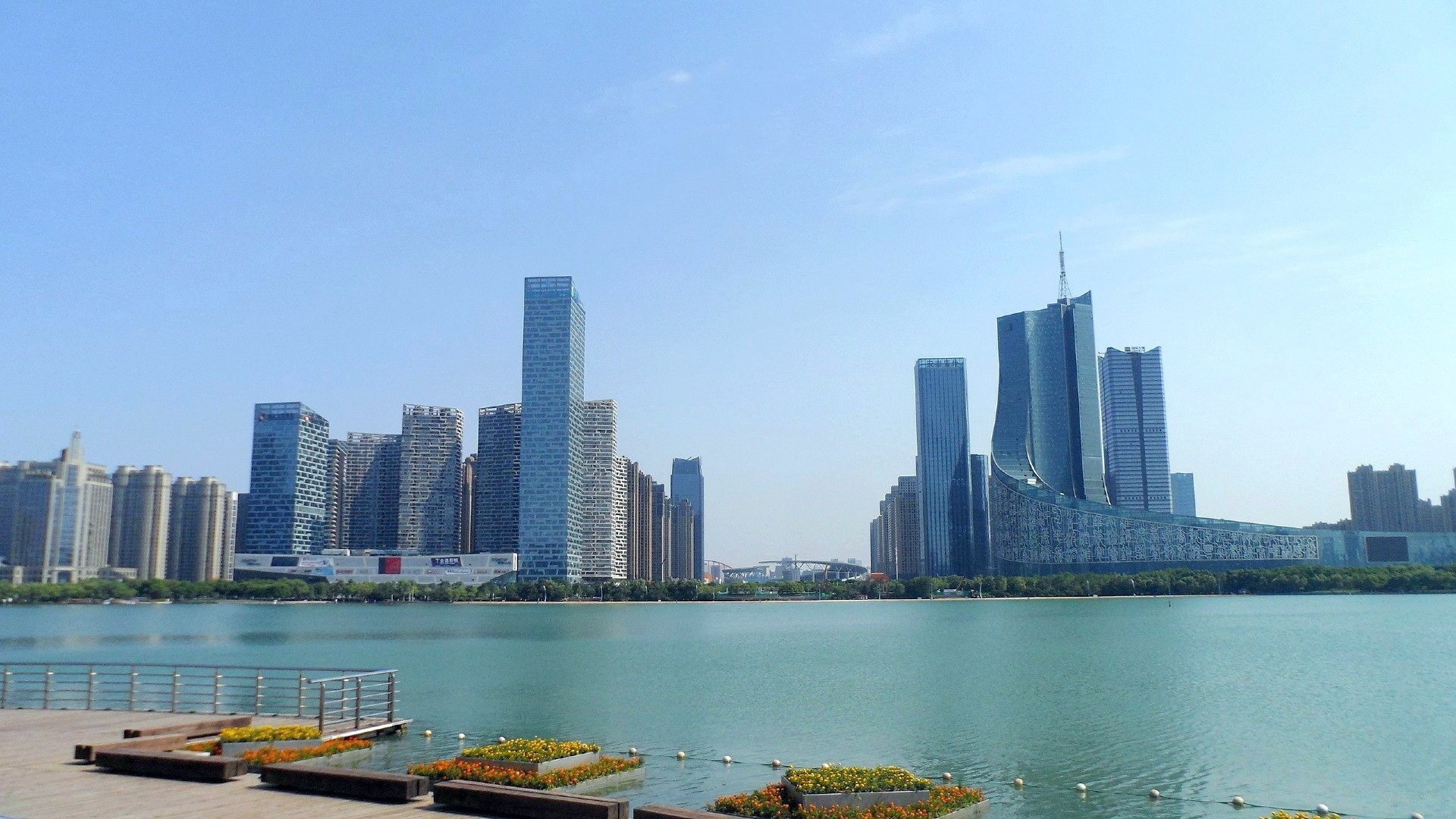
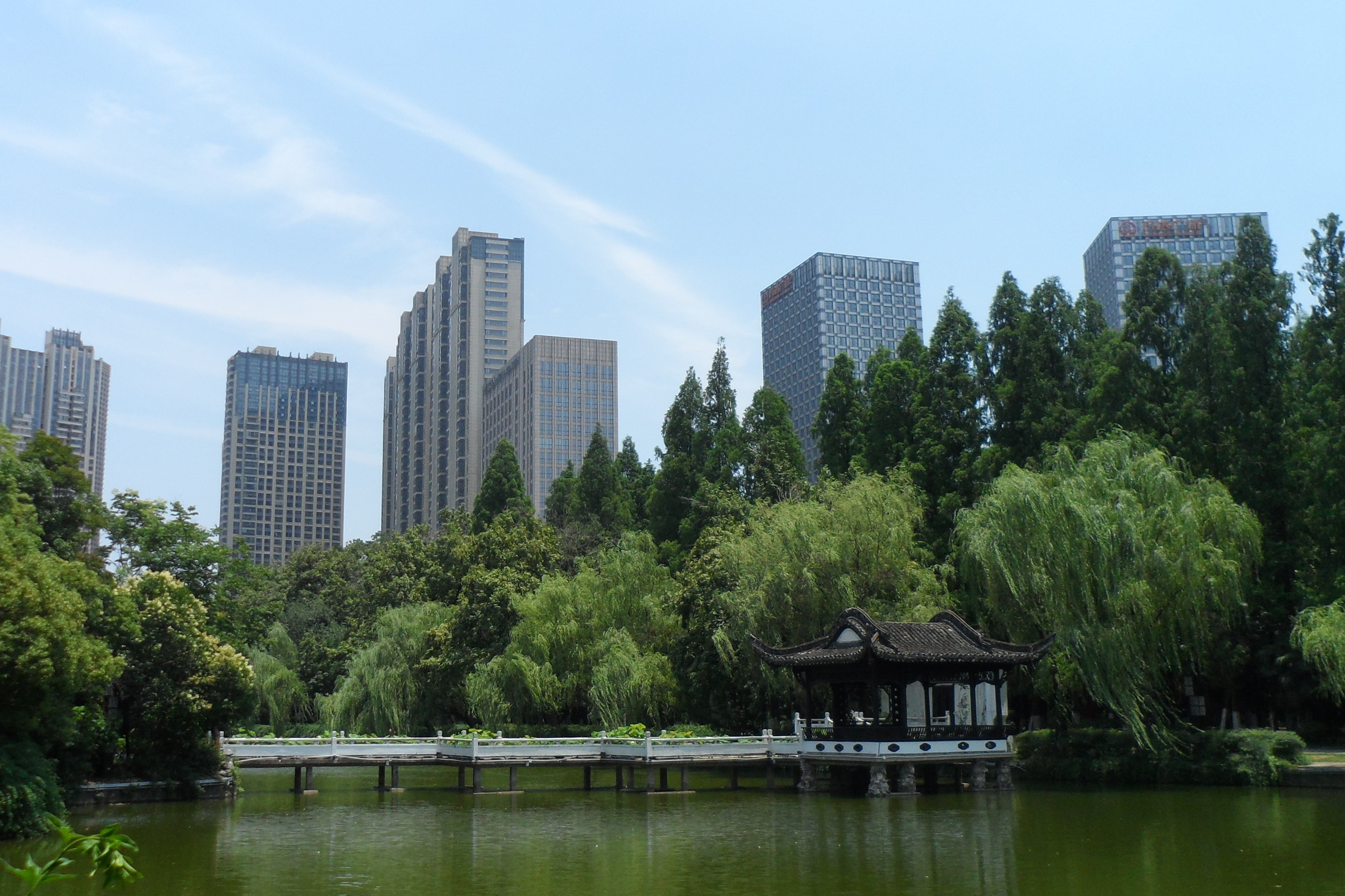
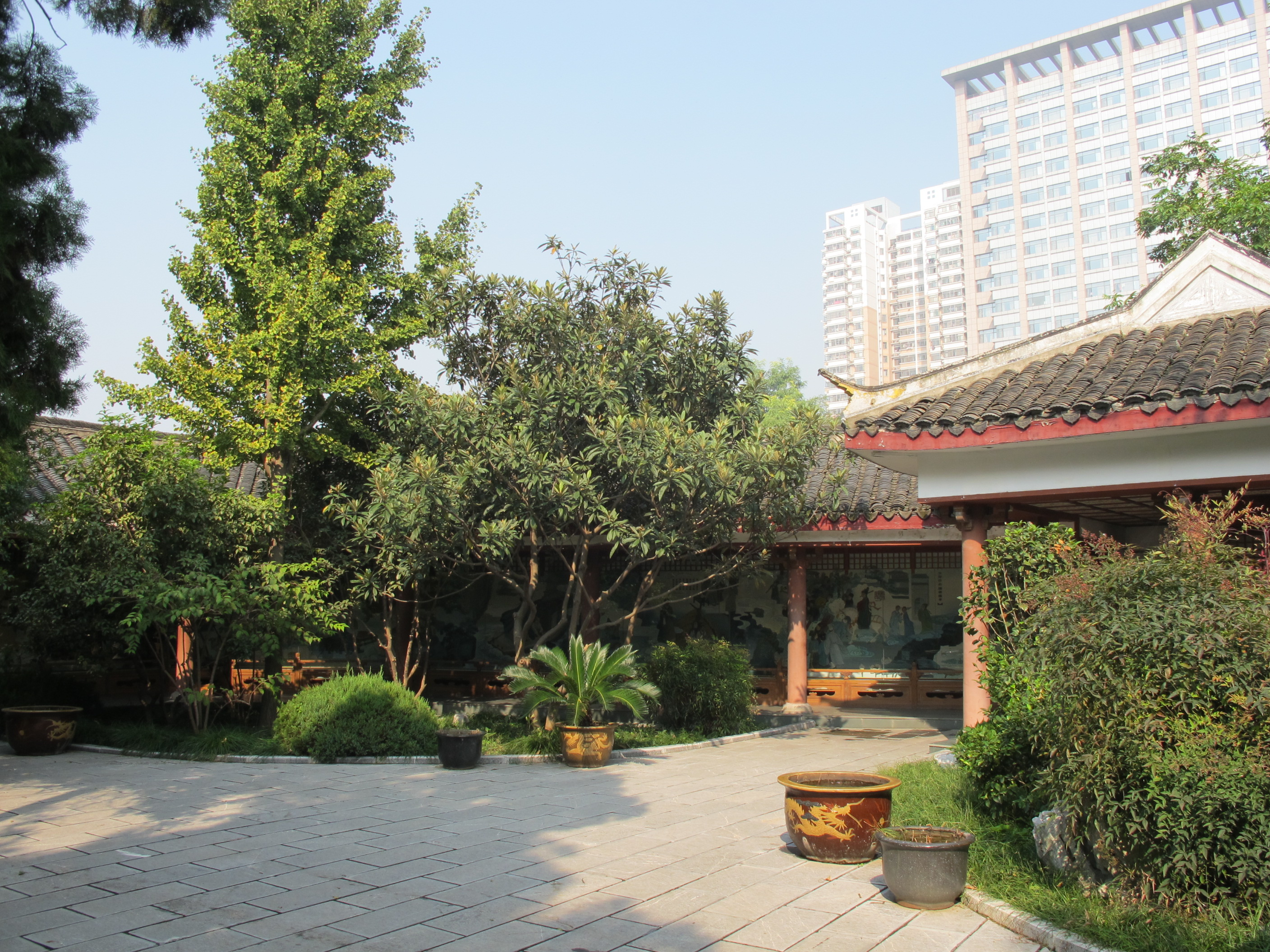
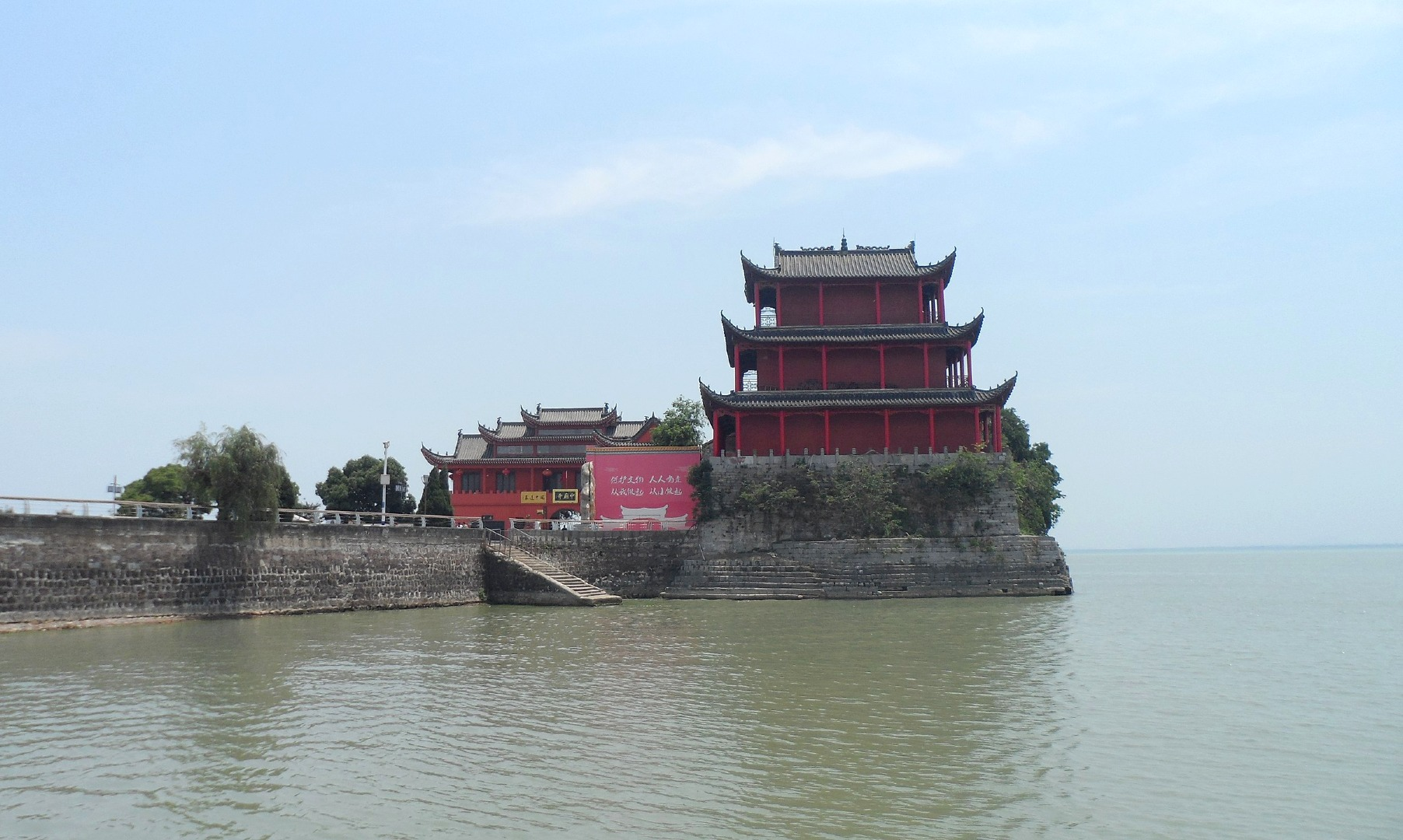
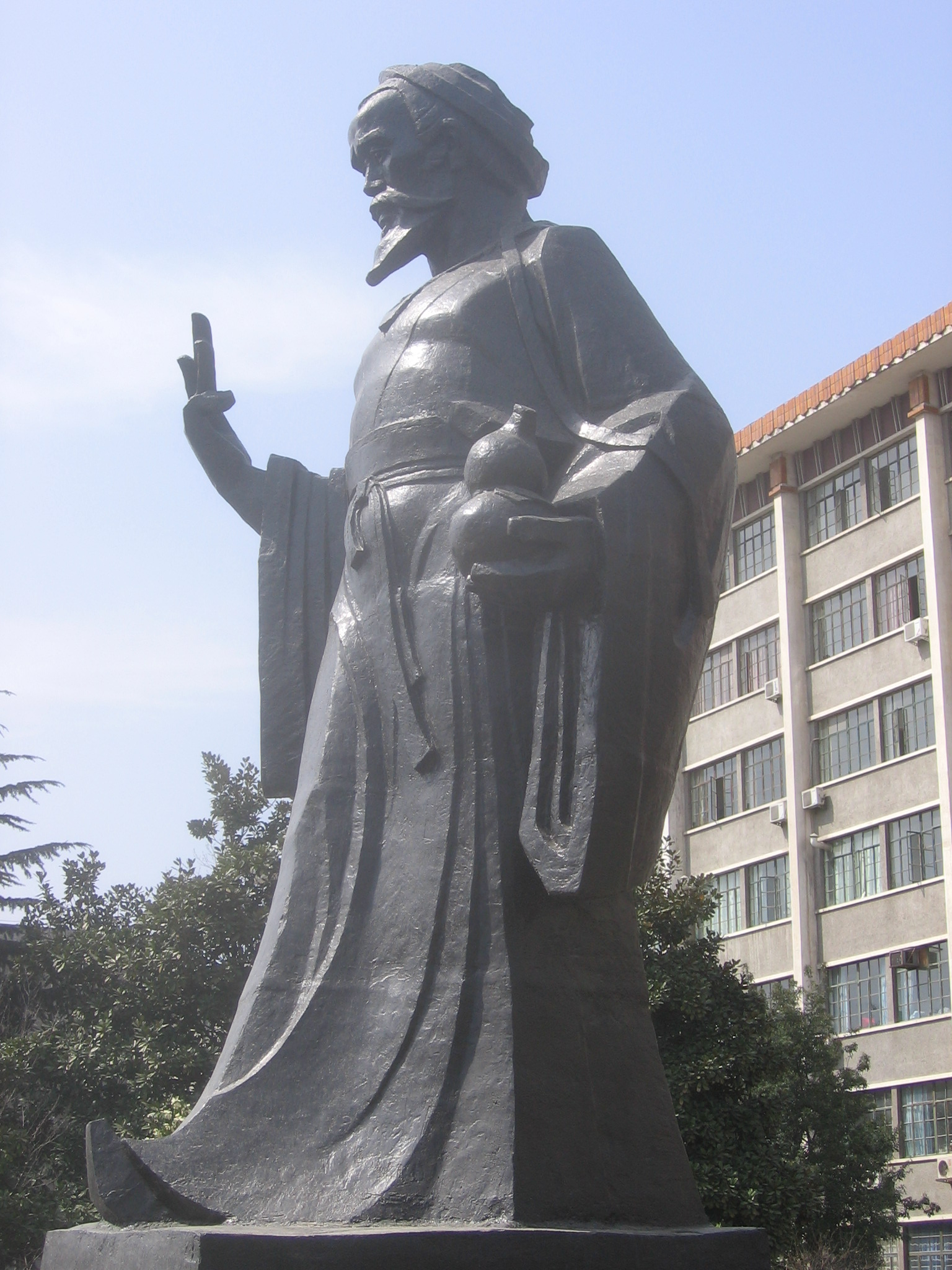
- Swan Lake CBD Baogong Park Lord Bao Temple Temple on Chao Lake Hua Tuo Statue

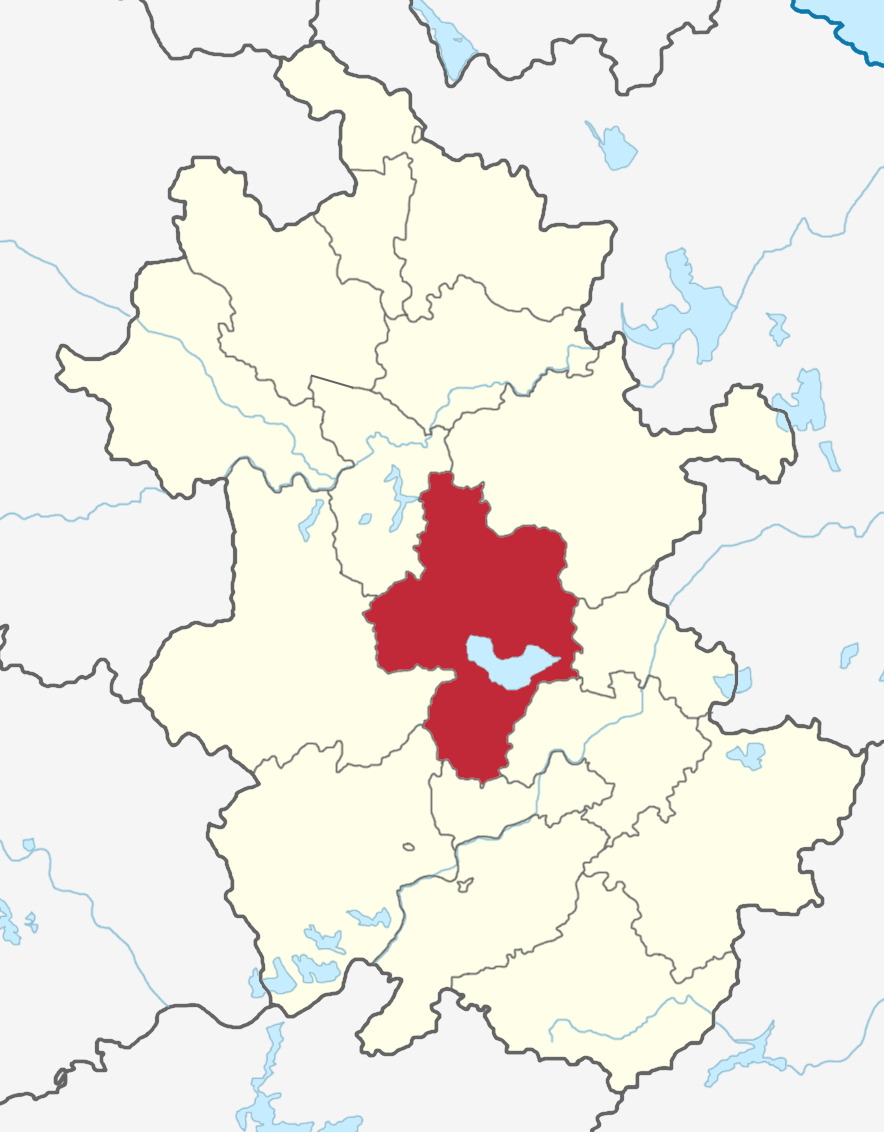
- Location of Hefei City jurisdiction in Anhui
- Interactive map of Hefei
- Location in Eastern China Hefei (China)
- Coordinates (Hefei municipal government): 31°49′14″N 117°13′38″E
- Country: China
- Province: Anhui
- County-level divisions: 7
- Municipal seat: Shushan District

Government
  - Type: Prefecture-level city
  - Body: Hefei Municipal People's Congress
  - CCP Secretary: Qin Weiguo
  - Congress Chairman: Wang Weidong
  - Mayor: Zhang Quan
  - CPPCC Chairman: Han Bing

Area
  - Prefecture-level city: 11,434.25 km^{2} (4,414.79 sq mi)
  - Urban: 838.5 km^{2} (323.7 sq mi)
  - Metro: 7,055.6 km^{2} (2,724.2 sq mi)
- Elevation: 37 m (121 ft)

Population (2022 census)
  - Prefecture-level city: 9,465,881
  - Density: 827.8532/km^{2} (2,144.130/sq mi)
  - Urban: 5,118,199
  - Urban density: 6,104/km^{2} (15,810/sq mi)
  - Metro: 7,754,481
  - Metro density: 1,099.1/km^{2} (2,846.5/sq mi)

GDP (2025)
  - Prefecture-level city: CN¥ 1,421 trillion US$ 206.03 billion
  - Per capita: CN¥ 120,579; US$ 18,691
- Time zone: UTC+8 (CST)
- Postal code: 230000
- Area code: 551
- ISO 3166 code: CN-AH-01
- License plate prefixes: 皖A
- Website: hefei.gov.cn
- City trees Southern magnolia (Magnolia grandiflora L.) City flowers Sweet Osmanthus (Osmanthus fragrans Lour.); Blossom of pomegranate (Punica granatum L.)

Hefei
- Chinese: 合肥
- Postal: Hofei
- Literal meaning: "Junction of the Fei Rivers"
Transcriptions
Standard Mandarin
- Hanyu Pinyin: Héféi
- Wade–Giles: Ho^{2}-fei^{2}
- IPA: [xɤ̌.fěɪ]
Wu
- Romanization: Gheh^{入}-vi^{平}
Yue: Cantonese
- Yale Romanization: Hahp-fèih
- Jyutping: Hap6-fei4
- IPA: [hɐp̚˨.fej˩]
Southern Min
- Hokkien POJ: Ha̍p-pûi

Hefei is the capital of Anhui province, China. A prefecture-level city, it is the political, economic, and cultural center of Anhui. Its population was 9,369,881 as of the 2020 census. Its built-up (or metro) area is made up of four urban districts plus Feidong, Feixi and Changfeng counties being urbanized, and was home to 7,754,481 inhabitants. Located in the central portion of the province, it borders Huainan to the north, Chuzhou to the northeast, Wuhu to the southeast, Tongling to the south, Anqing to the southwest and Lu'an to the west. A natural hub of communications, Hefei is situated to the north of Chao Lake and stands on a low saddle crossing the northeastern extension of the Dabie Mountains, which forms the divide between the Huai and Yangtze rivers.

The present-day city dates from the Song dynasty. Before World War II, Hefei remained essentially an administrative centre and the regional market for the fertile plain to the south. It has gone through a growth in infrastructure in recent years. Hefei is the location of Experimental Advanced Superconducting Tokamak, an experimental superconducting tokamak magnetic fusion energy reactor.

Hefei is a leading world city for scientific research, ranking at 12th globally, 8th in the Asia-Pacific, and 7th in China (behind Beijing, Shanghai, Nanjing, Guangzhou, Wuhan and Hangzhou), as tracked by the Nature Index in 2025. The city is represented by several major universities, including the University of Science and Technology of China, Hefei University of Technology, Anhui University, Anhui Agricultural University and Anhui Medical University. Notably, the University of Science and Technology of China is one of the top 100 comprehensive public research universities in the world.

== History ==
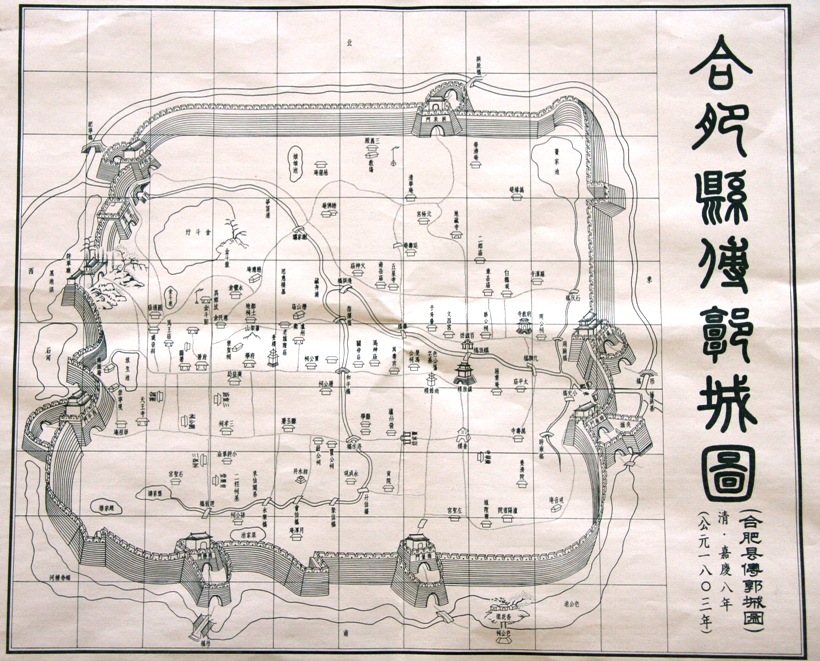
Old Hefei Map with wall

From the 8th to the 6th centuries BC, Hefei was the site of many small states, later a part of the Chu kingdom. Many archaeological finds dating from this period have been made. The name 'Hefei' was first given to the county set up in the area under the Han dynasty in the 2nd century BC.

In the 3rd century AD, the Battle of Xiaoyao Ford was fought at Xiaoyao Ford (逍遙津) in Hefei. Zhang Liao, a general of the Wei state, led 800 picked cavalry to defeat the 200,000-strong army from Wei's rival state Wu. Several decades of warring in Hefei between Wu and Wei followed this battle.

During the 4th to the 6th centuries AD, this crucial border region between northern and southern states was much fought over; its name and administrative status were consequently often changed. During the Sui (581–618) and Tang (618–907) periods, it became the seat of Lu prefecture—a title it kept until the 15th century, when it became a superior prefecture named Luzhou.

The present city dates from the Song dynasty (960–1126), the earlier Hefei having been some distance farther north. In the 10th year of Xining (熙宁, 1077 AD), the taxes collected from the Luchow Prefecture were 50315 Guan, approximately 25 million today's Chinese Yuan, with a ranking of the amount of taxes was the 11th(following Kaifeng, Hangzhou, Qinzhou, Chuzhou, Chengdu, Zizhou, Xingyuan, Mianzhou, Zhenzhou, Suzhou) among all the prefectures of Song Dynasty. During the 10th century, it was for a while the capital of the independent Wu kingdom (902–938) and was an important center of the Southern Tang state (937–975).

After 1127 it became a center of the defenses of the Southern Song dynasty (1126–1279) against the Jin (Jurchen) invaders in the Jin–Song wars, as well as a flourishing center of trade between the two states. When the Chinese Republic was founded in 1911, the superior prefecture was abolished, and the city took the name of Hefei. The city was known as Luchow or Liu-tcheou (庐州, p Luzhou) during the Ming and Qing dynasties (after the 14th century to the 19th century). Hefei was the temporary capital for Anhui from 1853 to 1862. It was renamed as Hefei County in 1912. Following the Chinese victory in the Second Sino-Japanese War in 1945, Hefei was made the capital of Anhui.

Before World War II, Hefei remained essentially an administrative center and the regional market for the fertile plain to the south. It was a collecting center for grain, beans, cotton, and hemp, as well as a center for handicraft industries manufacturing cloth, leather, bamboo goods, and ironware.

The construction in 1912 of the Tianjin–Pukou railway, farther east, for a while made Hefei a provincial backwater, and much of its importance passed to Bengbu. In 1932–36, however, a Chinese company built a railway linking Hefei with Yuxikou (on the Yangtze opposite Wuhu) to the southeast and with the Huai River at Huainan to the north. While this railway was built primarily to exploit the rich coalfield in northern Anhui, it also did much to revive the economy of the Hefei area by taking much of its produce to Wuhu and Nanjing.

Although Hefei was a quiet market town of only about 30,000 in the mid-1930s, its population grew more than tenfold in the following 20 years. The city's administrative role was strengthened by the transfer of the provincial government from Anqing in 1945, but much of its new growth derived from its development as an industrial city.

Hefei was designated the provincial capital in 1952.

A cotton mill was opened in 1958, and a thermal generating plant, using coal from Huainan, was established in the early 1950s. It also became the seat of an industry producing industrial chemicals and chemical fertilizers. In the late 1950s an iron and steel complex was built. In addition to a machine-tool works and engineering and agricultural machinery factories, the city has developed an aluminum industry and a variety of light industries.

Hefei's development was advanced by the Third Front construction. In 1970, the University of Science and Technology of China relocated to Hefei. It is one of the best technological universities in the country.

In 1978, the Chinese Academy of Sciences opened a Hefei branch. Several electronics institutes were moved from Beijing to Hefei in the early 1980s. The establishment of these educational and research and development institutions in Hefei were a foundations for its subsequent growth in innovation.

In 1991, Hefei was one of the first Chinese cities to establish a High-Tech Industrial Zone.

A period of rapid growth began in 2005, when Hefei party secretary Sun Jinlong initiated a strategy of industry-based city building. Sun prioritized the automobile, electric appliance, and equipment manufacturing sectors of the city's economy. The city government established a department for attracting investment and sent teams around the country to recruit businesses to Hefei. Sun also launched a construction program of neighborhood redevelopment, road system improvement, rail system, and a new international airport. Hefei's GDP grew at the highest rate of any Chinese provincial capital during Sun's tenure.

Since the 2010s, Hefei has developed high-tech industries and an innovation-driven economy, including semi-conductors and alternative energy economic sectors.

== Geography ==
Hefei is located 130 kilometres (81 mi) west of Nanjing in south-central Anhui. Chao Lake, a lake 15 km (9 mi) southeast of the city, is one of the largest fresh water lakes in China. Though the lake has unfortunately been polluted with nitrogen and phosphorus in recent decades, the situation is improving due to efforts by both the government and the people.

=== Climate ===
Hefei features a humid subtropical climate (Köppen Cfa) with four distinct seasons. Hefei's annual average temperature is 16.6 °C (61.9 °F). Its annual precipitation is just slightly over 1,000 millimetres (39 in), being heavier from May through August. Winters are damp and cold, with January lows dipping just below freezing and January averaging 2.8 °C (37.0 °F). The city sees irregular snowfalls that rarely turn significant. Occasional cold spells from Siberia that usually happen during winter months such as December, January, February. Sometimes November and March which can bring snow and heavier snowfall. (Springs are generally relatively pleasant if somewhat erratic. Summers are hot and humid, with a July average of 28.6 °C (83.5 °F). In the months of June, July, August, and often September, daily temperatures can reach or surpass 37 °C (99 °F) with high humidity levels being the norm. Autumn in Hefei sees a gradual cooling and drying. With monthly percent possible sunshine ranging from 35 percent in March to 50 percent in August, the city receives 1,868 hours of bright sunshine annually. Extremes since 1951 have ranged from −20.6 °C (−5 °F) on 6 January 1955, to 41.1 °C (106 °F) on 27 July 2017.

Climate data for Hefei, elevation 50 m (160 ft), (1991–2020 normals, extremes 1951–present)
Month	Jan	Feb	Mar	Apr	May	Jun	Jul	Aug	Sep	Oct	Nov	Dec	Year
Record high °C (°F)	22.1 (71.8)	27.5 (81.5)	33.7 (92.7)	34.7 (94.5)	36.4 (97.5)	38.0 (100.4)	41.1 (106.0)	41.0 (105.8)	38.6 (101.5)	39.9 (103.8)	30.1 (86.2)	24.0 (75.2)	41.1 (106.0)
Mean daily maximum °C (°F)	7.2 (45.0)	10.2 (50.4)	15.5 (59.9)	21.9 (71.4)	27.1 (80.8)	29.7 (85.5)	32.6 (90.7)	32.1 (89.8)	28.2 (82.8)	22.9 (73.2)	16.4 (61.5)	9.9 (49.8)	21.1 (70.1)
Daily mean °C (°F)	3.1 (37.6)	5.7 (42.3)	10.6 (51.1)	16.8 (62.2)	22.2 (72.0)	25.6 (78.1)	28.6 (83.5)	27.9 (82.2)	23.6 (74.5)	17.9 (64.2)	11.4 (52.5)	5.3 (41.5)	16.6 (61.8)
Mean daily minimum °C (°F)	−0.1 (31.8)	2.2 (36.0)	6.6 (43.9)	12.4 (54.3)	17.8 (64.0)	21.9 (71.4)	25.4 (77.7)	24.7 (76.5)	20.1 (68.2)	13.9 (57.0)	7.4 (45.3)	1.7 (35.1)	12.8 (55.1)
Record low °C (°F)	−20.6 (−5.1)	−14.1 (6.6)	−7.3 (18.9)	−0.4 (31.3)	6.2 (43.2)	12.2 (54.0)	17.9 (64.2)	15.8 (60.4)	10.8 (51.4)	1.5 (34.7)	−5.1 (22.8)	−13.5 (7.7)	−20.6 (−5.1)
Average precipitation mm (inches)	47.4 (1.87)	52.8 (2.08)	76.3 (3.00)	83.7 (3.30)	90.1 (3.55)	158.5 (6.24)	185.1 (7.29)	138.7 (5.46)	70.3 (2.77)	51.6 (2.03)	54.6 (2.15)	33.7 (1.33)	1,042.8 (41.07)
Average precipitation days (≥ 0.1 mm)	9.0	8.8	10.3	9.8	10.4	10.5	11.8	11.9	8.1	8.3	8.2	6.8	113.9
Average snowy days	4.3	2.6	1.1	0	0	0	0	0	0	0	0.5	1.5	10
Average relative humidity (%)	75	74	71	70	71	77	80	81	77	74	75	73	75
Mean monthly sunshine hours	109.2	113.7	143.2	173.9	182.9	155.9	186.2	176.8	150.0	151.3	140.4	126.9	1,810.4
Percentage possible sunshine	34	36	38	45	43	37	43	43	41	43	45	41	41
Source: China Meteorological Administration extremes

=== Air pollution ===
Air quality typically diminishes in May and June when the city is blanketed by smog caused by the smoke generated as farmers outside the city burn their fields in preparation for planting the next crop.

== Administrative divisions and demographics ==
=== Demographics ===
Historical population
Year	Pop.	±%
1953	183,570	—
1964	431,490	+135.1%
1982	535,681	+24.1%
1990	714,242	+33.3%
2000	1,549,476	+116.9%
2010	3,098,727	+100.0%
2020	5,055,978	+63.2%
Source: Census in China

The majority of the population in Hefei are Han Chinese. There are a comparatively small number of Hui people living in the city, for whom a few mosques have been constructed. Of the more than five million people in the city, some are migrant workers from other parts of Anhui.

=== Administration ===
The prefecture-level city of Hefei administers nine county-level divisions, including four districts, one county-city and four counties.

Hefei subdivisions area (km^{2}), population (According to 2010 Census) and population density (per km^{2}).

Map
Division code	English	Chinese	Pinyin	Area in km2	Seat	Postal code	Subdivisions					
Division code	English	Chinese	Pinyin	Area in km2	Seat	Postal code	Subdistricts	Towns	Townships	Ethnic townships	Residential communities	Villages
340100	Hefei	合肥市	Héféi Shì	11434.25	Shushan District	230000	45	65	19	1	736	1102
340102	Yaohai District	瑶海区	Yáohǎi Qū	142.90	Mingguang Road Subdistrict (明光路街道)	230000	13	2	1		118	18
340103	Luyang District	庐阳区	Lúyáng Qū	139.32	Bozhou Road Subdistrict (亳州路街道)	230000	11	1			84	14
340104	Shushan District	蜀山区	Shǔshān Qū	261.36	Sanli'an Subdistrict (三里庵街道)	230000	8	2			92	17
340111	Baohe District	包河区	Bāohé Qū	294.94	Luogang Subdistrict (骆岗街道)	230000	7	2			77	38
340121	Changfeng County	长丰县	Chángfēng Xiàn	1928.45	Shuihu (水湖镇)	231100		8	6		80	193
340122	Feidong County	肥东县	Féidōng Xiàn	2205.92	Dianbu (店埠镇)	231600		10	4		95	249
340123	Feixi County	肥西县	Féixī Xiàn	2082.66	Shangpai (上派镇)	231200		12	6	1	90	241
340124	Lujiang County	庐江县	Lújiāng Xiàn	2347.48	Lucheng (庐城镇)	231500		17			38	194
340181	Chaohu	巢湖市	Cháohú Shì	2031.22	Woniushan Subdistrict (卧牛山街道)	238000	6	11	1		62	138

== Economy ==
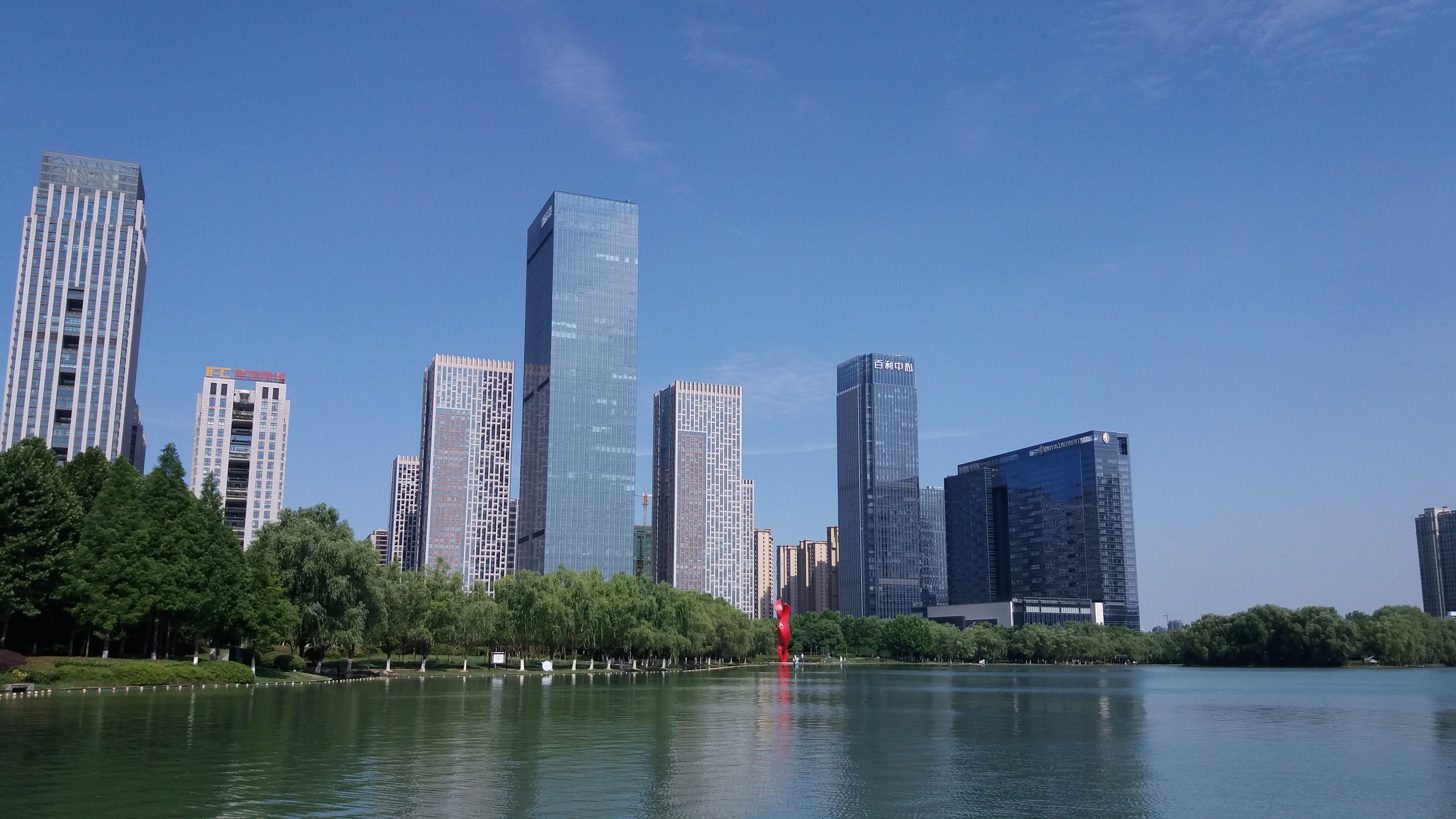
Swan Lake CBD area

As of 2021, the GDP of Hefei is CN¥1,141.28 billion. The GDP per capita of the city is ¥121,187 (US$18,784), ranking within the top 20 of cities in China.

As of 2023, the GDP of Hefei is CN¥1,267.38 billion.

In 2025, Hefei produced 1.37 million electric vehicles, equivalent to nearly one in every 12 electric vehicles made in China.

=== Investments and state-owned enterprises ===
Hefei's city government is highly engaged in business, both through state-owned enterprises and investment. This approach has helped drive economic growth and re-structure the cities economic base.

In 2008, the local government spent US$3.5 billion for a controlling ownership stake in BOE Technology (Jingdongfang). BOE Technology subsequently grew to be one of the world's leading manufacturers of semiconductor products for telecommunications. It is also the world's largest manufacturer of liquid crystal displays, organic light-emitting diodes, and flexible displays. As of at least 2024, BOE has three production lines in Hefei, and its presence has helped Hefei attract further business in the electronics supply chain and contributed to Hefei's development as one of the main centers for the optoelectronic industry in China.

In 2008, Hefei invested heavily in iFlytek, a voice-recognition technology firm spun off from USTC.

The local government invested heavily in NIO in order to integrate it with Hefei Changan Automobile, a legacy enterprise from the Third Front construction. NIO was on the brink of bankruptcy in 2020 when Hefei obtained a 25% stake in the company in exchange for RMB 7 billion. NIO moved its headquarters to Hefei, where the government helped it obtain loans from local banks to expand its supply chains. As of 2022, NIO is China's most successful electric vehicle manufacturer. The local government has also invested in the ChangXin Memory Technologies, which is China's largest and the world's fourth-largest DRAM maker.

=== Analysis of growth ===
Hefei has been identified by the Economist Intelligence Unit in the November 2010 Access China White Paper as a member of the CHAMPS (Chongqing, Hefei, Anshan, Ma'anshan, Pingdingshan and Shenyang), an economic profile of the top 20 emerging cities in China.

Hefei was identified by The Economist in December 2012 as the world's No.1 fastest growing metropolitan economy.

Hefei has supported the growth of the chip industry in the city and has become one of the biggest sites for the manufacture of memory chips (DRAM).

== Transportation ==
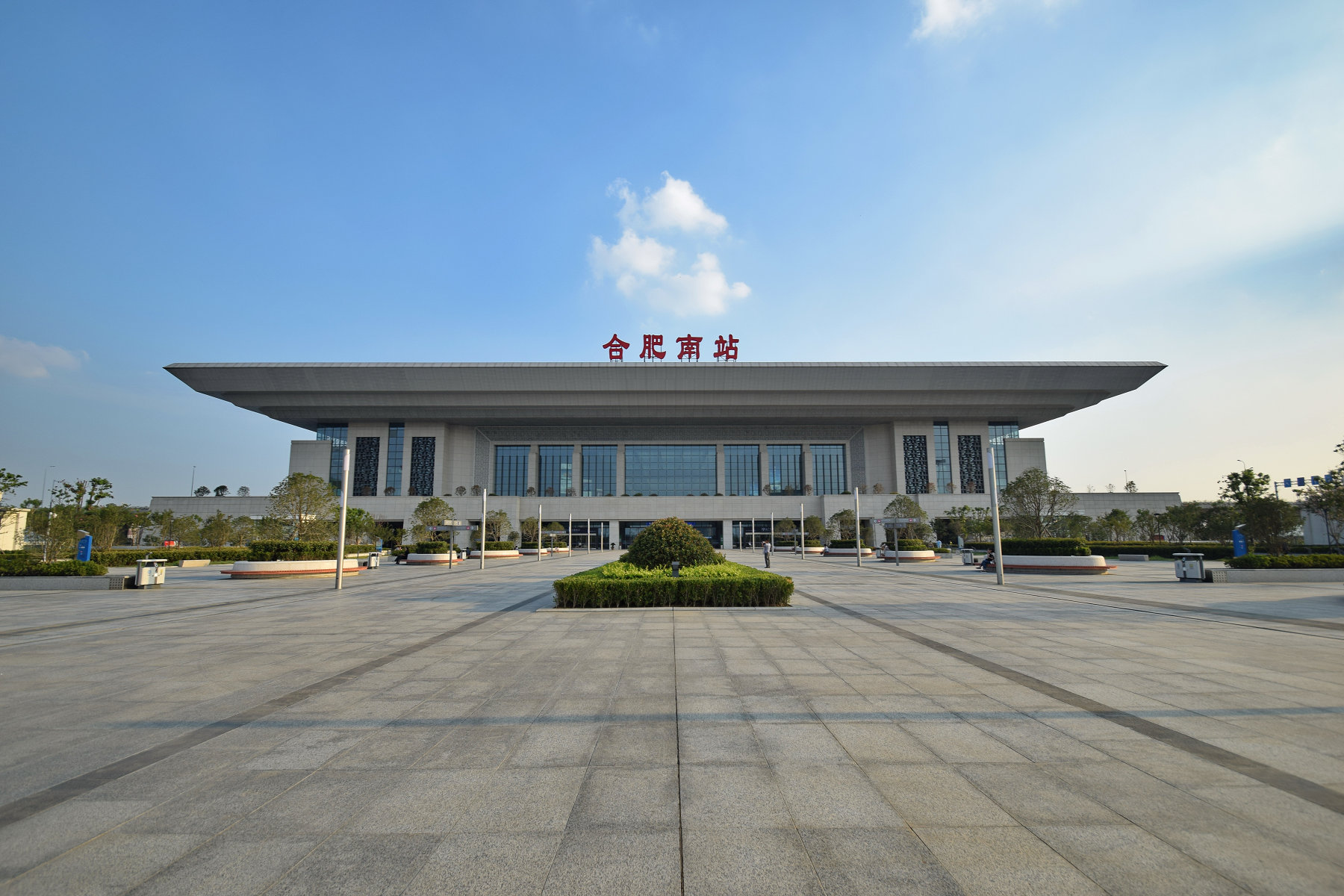
Hefei South Railway Station

Hefei has been the provincial capital since 1945 (before it was Lihuang, which is today's Jinzhai) and is a natural center of transportation, being situated to the north of Chao Lake and standing on a low saddle crossing the northeastern extension of the Dabie Mountains, which form the divide between the Huai and Yangtze rivers. From Hefei there is easy water transport via the lake to the Yangtze River opposite Wuhu.

=== Rail ===
There are two main train stations in Hefei. The newest one is Hefei South railway station (Hefeinan station, 合肥火车南站) where most high-speed trains pass through. The alternative station is Hefei railway station (合肥火车站) which is smaller and older.

There are some small stations such as Feidong Station (肥东火车站), Feixi Station (肥西火车站), Shuijiahu Station (水家湖火车站), Chaohu Station (巢湖火车站), Chaohu East railway station (Chaohudong station; 巢湖火车东站), Hefeibeicheng Station (Hefei Northtown Station 合肥北城火车站), Lujiang Station (庐江火车站) and so on. These stations are mostly located in small towns and connect commuters with the main city.

=== Air ===
Hefei Xinqiao International Airport replaced the old Hefei Luogang International Airport and started its operation on 30 May 2013, 00:00. This new domestic aviation hub is located in Gaoliu Village situated in the northwestern part of Hefei City. The first arriving flight was China Eastern Airlines flight MU5172 from Beijing Capital International Airport. The first departing flight was China Eastern Airlines MU5468 to Shanghai Pudong International Airport. Hefei Xinqiao International Airport provides scheduled passenger service to major airports in China and other international cities. Destinations include Hong Kong, Macao, Singapore, Taipei (Taoyuan, Songshan), Kaohsiung, Taichung, Seoul, Cheongju, Yangyang, Jeju, Osaka, Nagoya, Shizuoka, Okayama, Boracay Island, Bali Island, Frankfurt, Siem Reap, Bangkok, Phuket Island and Krabi Island.

=== Subway ===
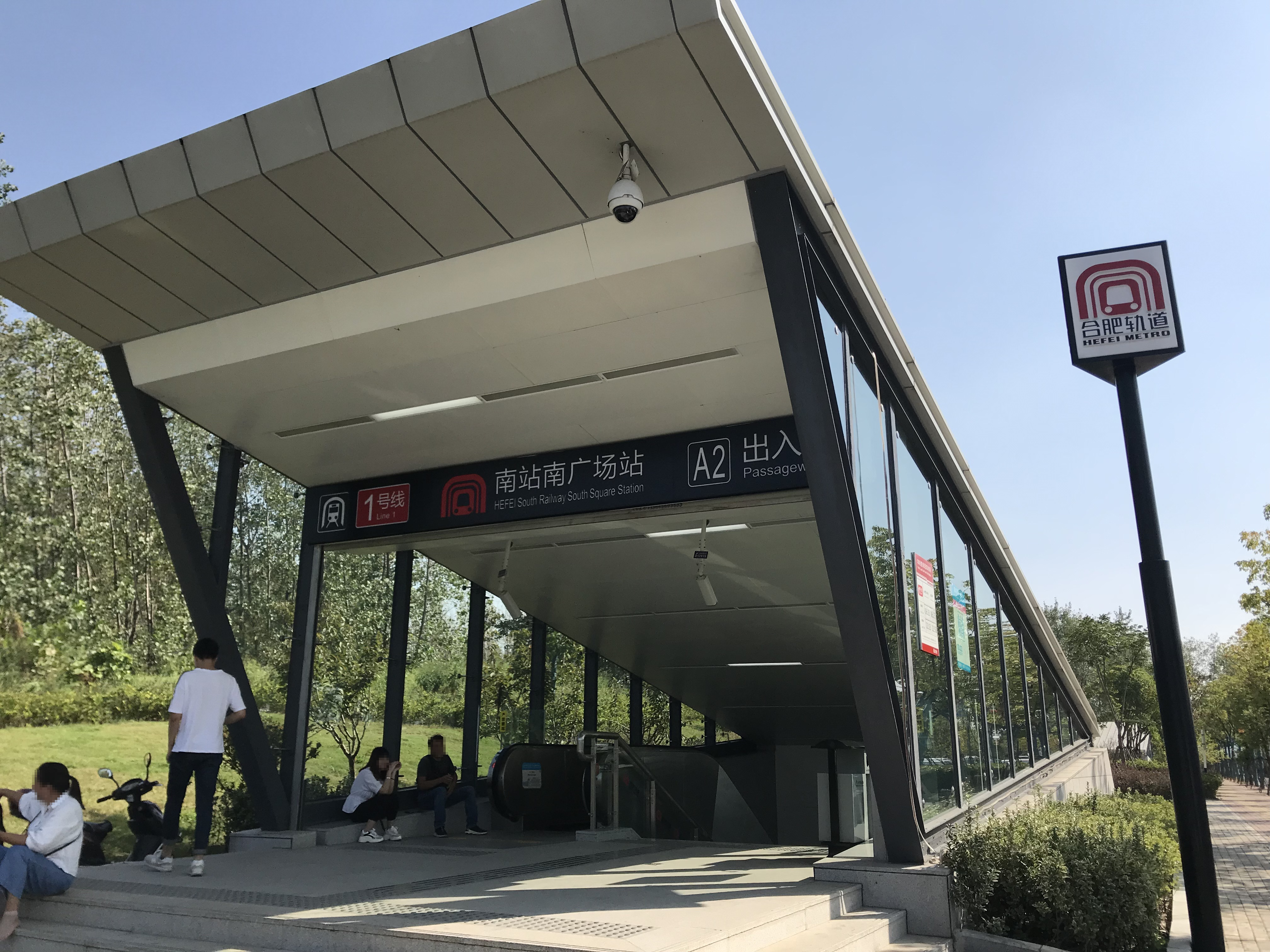
Entrance to Hefei South Railway South Square Station

Hefei Metro is a rapid transit rail network under construction that will eventually serve both urban and rural areas of Hefei. As planned, Line 1 covers a total distance of 24 kilometres (15 miles) starting from Hefei Railway Station. It was inaugurated in December 2016.

In February 2013, Metro Line 2 also began its construction. It is being built alongside the Changjiang Dong Road, Changjiang Zhong Road and Changjiang Xi Road, which is a major passenger corridor in the east–west direction. It will pass through the city center area and connect to a transit point where passengers will be able to take the shuttle bus to Hefei Xinqiao International Airport. The Line 2 was opened on 26 December 2017.

In November 2015, Metro Line 3 construction began. Line 3 was opened on 26 December 2019. Line 3 connects the New Station Exploitative-experimental Zone and the Economic Technology Development District, from the vocational education town to the university town. In 2016, Metro Line 4 construction began and was subsequently opened on 26 December 2021. Line 4 connects the New Station Exploitative-experimental Zone and the High Technology Development District. In 2017, Metro Line 5 construction began. The south part of Line 5 was opened on 26 December 2020. Line 5 connects Binhu New District and the Beicheng (North city) New District. The north part of Line 5 is expected to open at the end of 2022.

Alongside Line 1, Line 2, Line 3, Line 4 and Line 5, Hefei is also planning to build other 12 metro lines, 4 lines of intra-metropolitan rail transit (to Lu'an, Huainan, Lujiang and Chaohu) and 3 lines of tram and hopefully accomplish the project by 2030.

=== Bus ===
There is an extensive public bus system in the city, including eight bus rapid transit lines. There are several commuter lines which only run at designated time or having a large interval.

== Universities and research ==
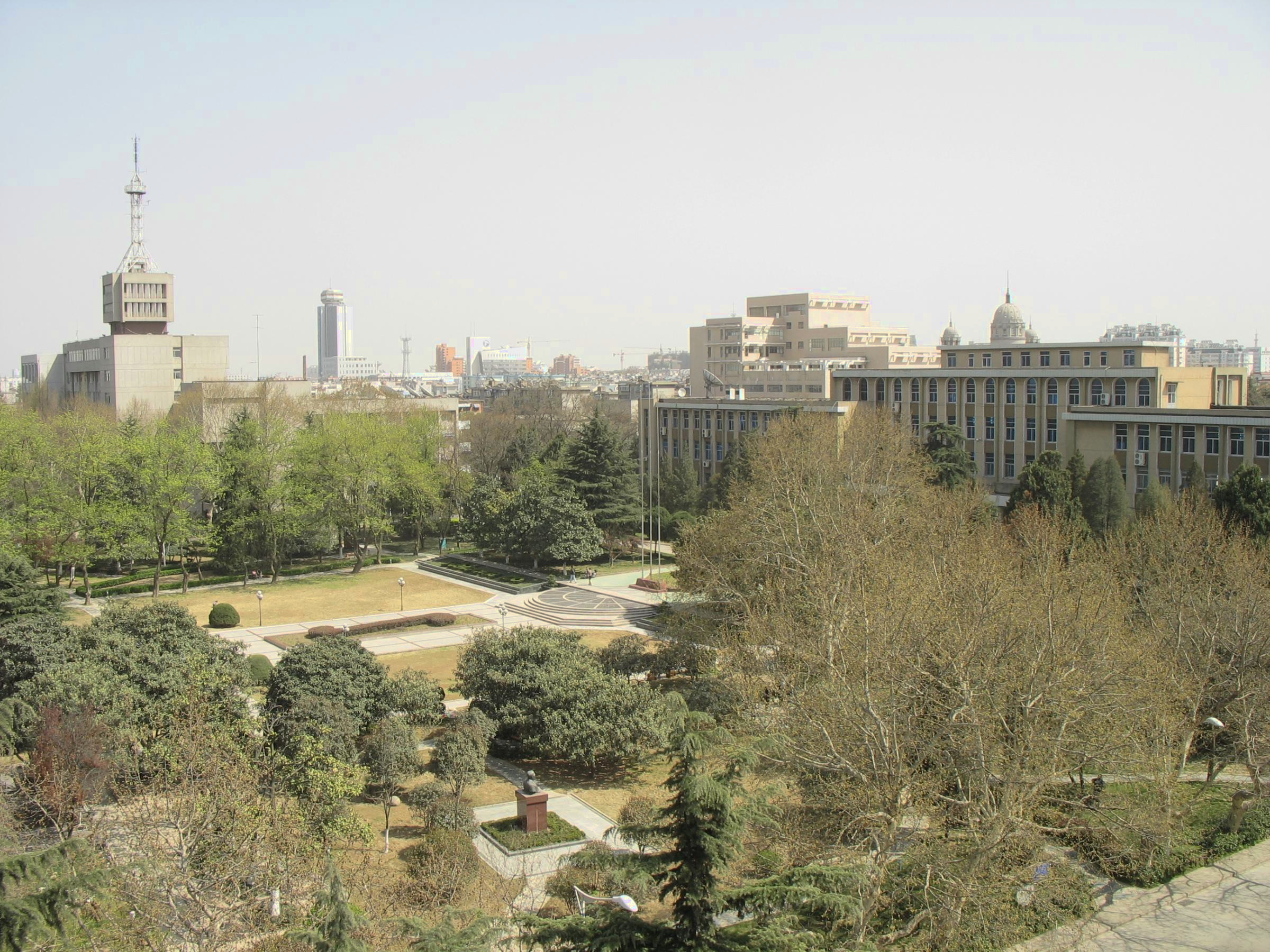
An older (c.2007) view of University of Science and Technology of China, including the Teaching Building II and the old library (now an administrative building)

Hefei is a leading world city for scientific research, ranking at 12th globally, 8th in the Asia-Pacific, and 7th in China (behind Beijing, Shanghai, Nanjing, Guangzhou, Wuhan and Hangzhou), as tracked by the Nature Index in 2025. Hefei was one of the four national science centers identified in China's 14th Five-Year Plan.

Hefei plays an important role in scientific research in China. It has seven national laboratories, second only to Beijing: The National Synchrotron Radiation Laboratory (Chinese: 国家同步辐射实验室; pinyin: Guójiā tóngbù fúshè shíyàn shì), the Hefei National Laboratory for Physical Sciences at the Microscale (Chinese: 微尺度物质科学国家实验室; pinyin: Wēi chǐdù wùzhí kēxué guójiā shíyàn shì), both of which are under the University of Science and Technology of China. It also has the Institute of Solid State Physics, Institute of Plasma Physics, Institute of Intelligent Machines, High Magnetic Field Laboratory (founded in 2008), Anhui Institute of Optics and Fine Mechanics, all of which are under the Hefei Institutes of Physical Science which belongs to the Chinese Academy of Sciences. Hefei is the location of Experimental Advanced Superconducting Tokamak, an experimental superconducting tokamak magnetic fusion energy reactor. The No. 105 Hospital of the People's Liberation Army, located in Hefei, is reportedly the site of the first human trials using CRISPR genome editing, doing so in 2015.

As of 2017, Hefei had 60 universities and more than 564 research institutes. The city is represented by several major universities, including the University of Science and Technology of China, Hefei University of Technology, Anhui University, Anhui Agricultural University and Anhui Medical University. Notably, the University of Science and Technology of China is one of the top 100th comprehensive public research universities in the world.

- University of Science and Technology of China (USTC)
- Hefei University of Technology (HFUT)
- Anhui University (AHU)
- Anhui Agricultural University (AHAU)
- Anhui Medical University (AHMU)
- Anhui University of Chinese Medicine (AUCM)
- Anhui Jianzhu University (AHJU)
- Hefei Normal University (HNU)
- Hefei University (HU)
- Beihang University (BUAA) – Hefei Campus
- National University of Defense Technology (NUDT) – Hefei Campus
- Beijing Foreign Studies University (BFSU) – Hefei Campus
- Tianjin University (TJU) – Hefei Graduate School
- Peking University (PKU) – Hefei Graduate School
- Tsinghua University (THU) – Hefei Institute of Public Safety Research

== Yicheng Prison ==
Yicheng Prison is located within the city. It was built during the 1983 "Strike Hard" campaign and was formerly Hefei Zhenxing Machine Parts Factory. On 15 June 1984, the Prov. Justice Dept. decided to change the name of the Machine Parts Factory's Internal Dept. to the Prov. Independent LRC. On 17 March 1986, the city's Party Committee and government agreed to the change. On 26 April more than 400 inmates were transferred to Hefei Shangzhangwei Farm and Baihu Farm. In February 1992 a secondary country level prison was created at the Shangzhangwei Farm. In August 1992 the Hefei City LRD level was upgraded by the government. In June 1996 the prison was changed to its present name. It is currently controlled by Hefei city. It mainly houses prisoners with sentences of less than five years and houses up to 1000 prisoners a year. In the past 20 years, nearly 20,000 inmates have completed their sentences here. The prison mainly cultivates vegetables and rice but also cooperates with the Zhejiang Rongguang Group and produces soccer training shoes, soccer balls, tourism products, and other products.

== Sport ==
Hefei had its own football team called Anhui Jiufang, who in the 2007–08 season were promoted from the Chinese Football Association Yi League to the Chinese Football Association Jia League which is the second highest tier of Chinese football. It was acquired by Tianjin Runyulong in 2011.

== Sites of interest ==
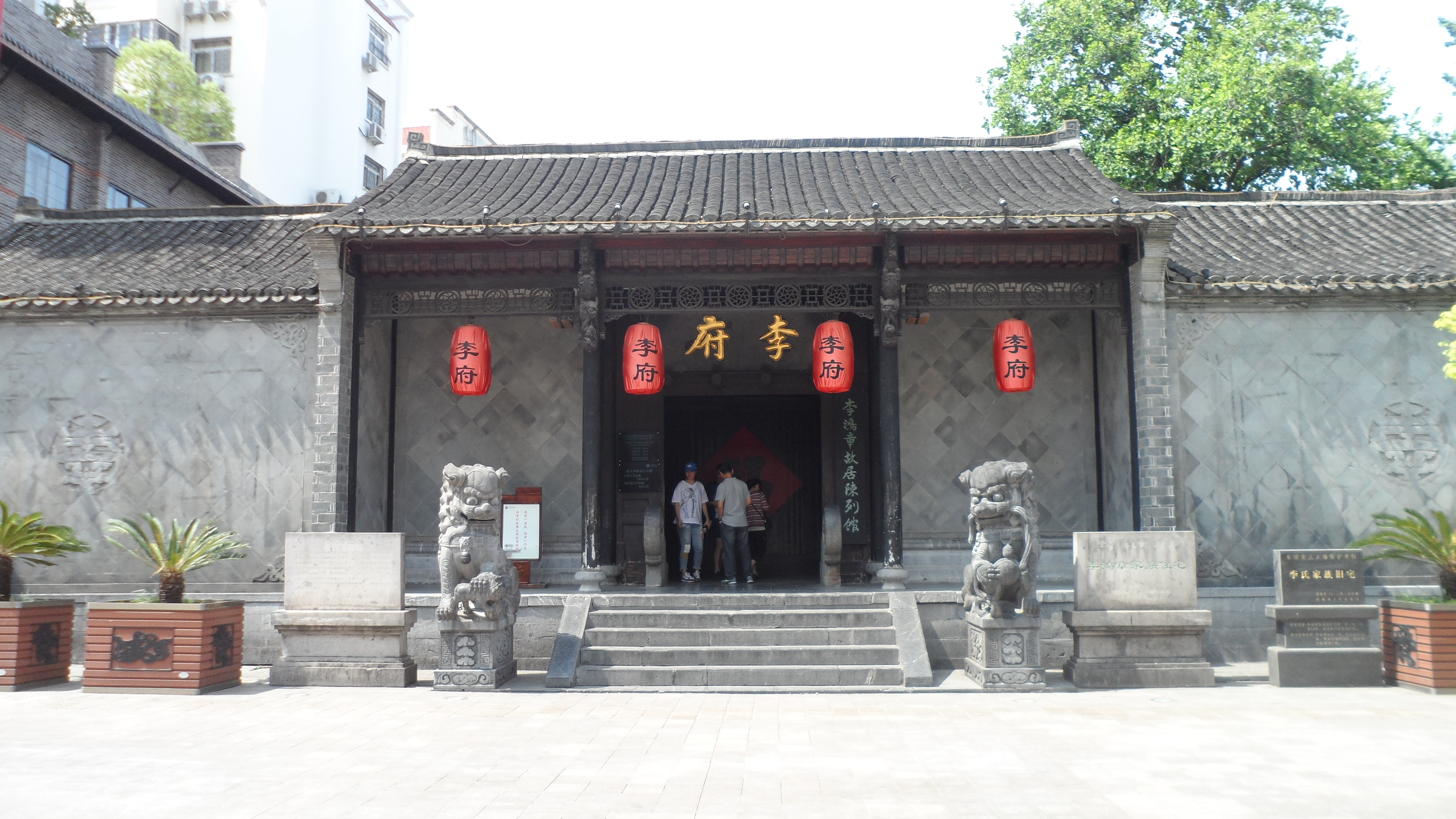
Former Residence of Li Hongzhang

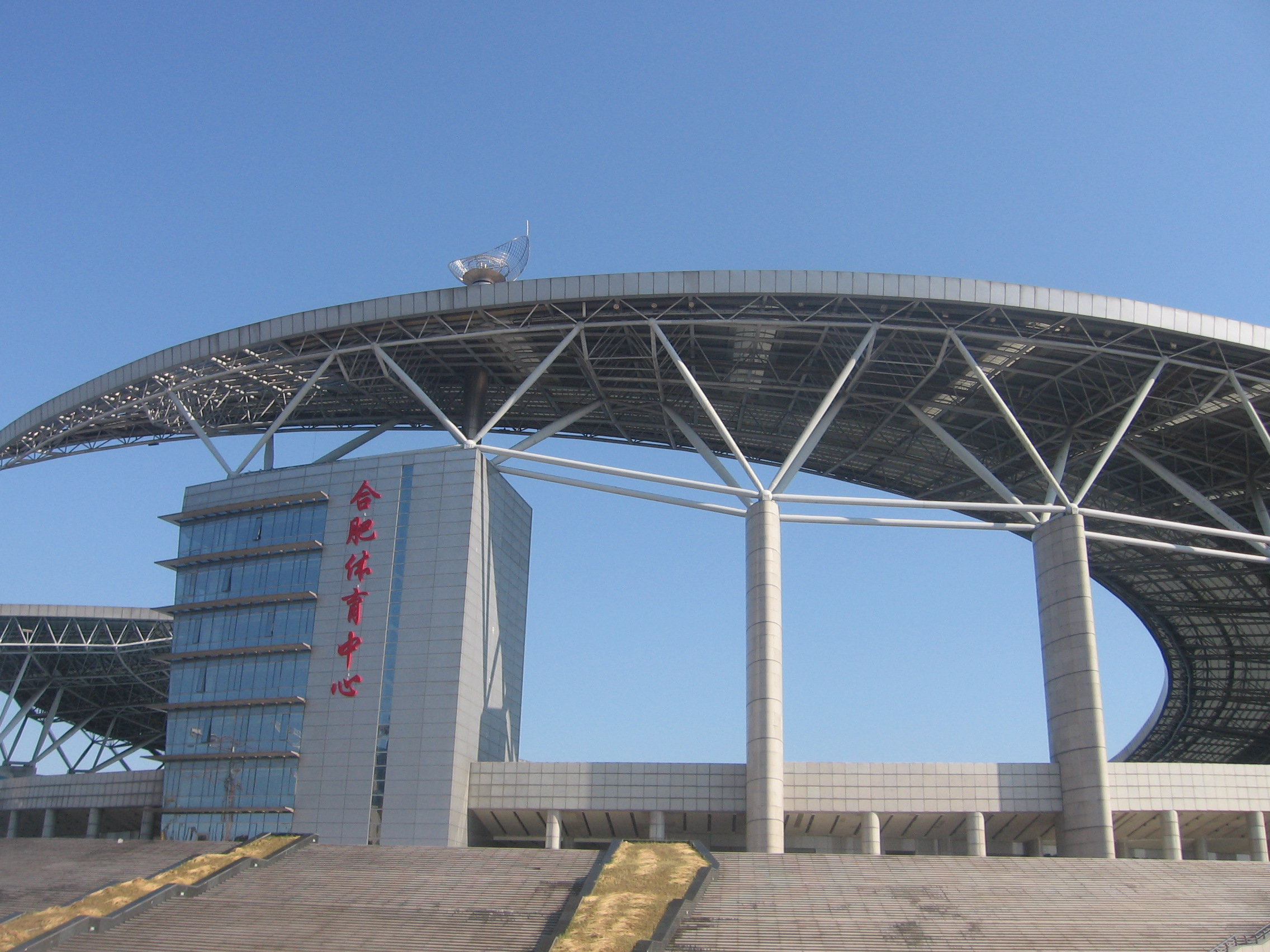
Hefei Olympic Sports Center Stadium

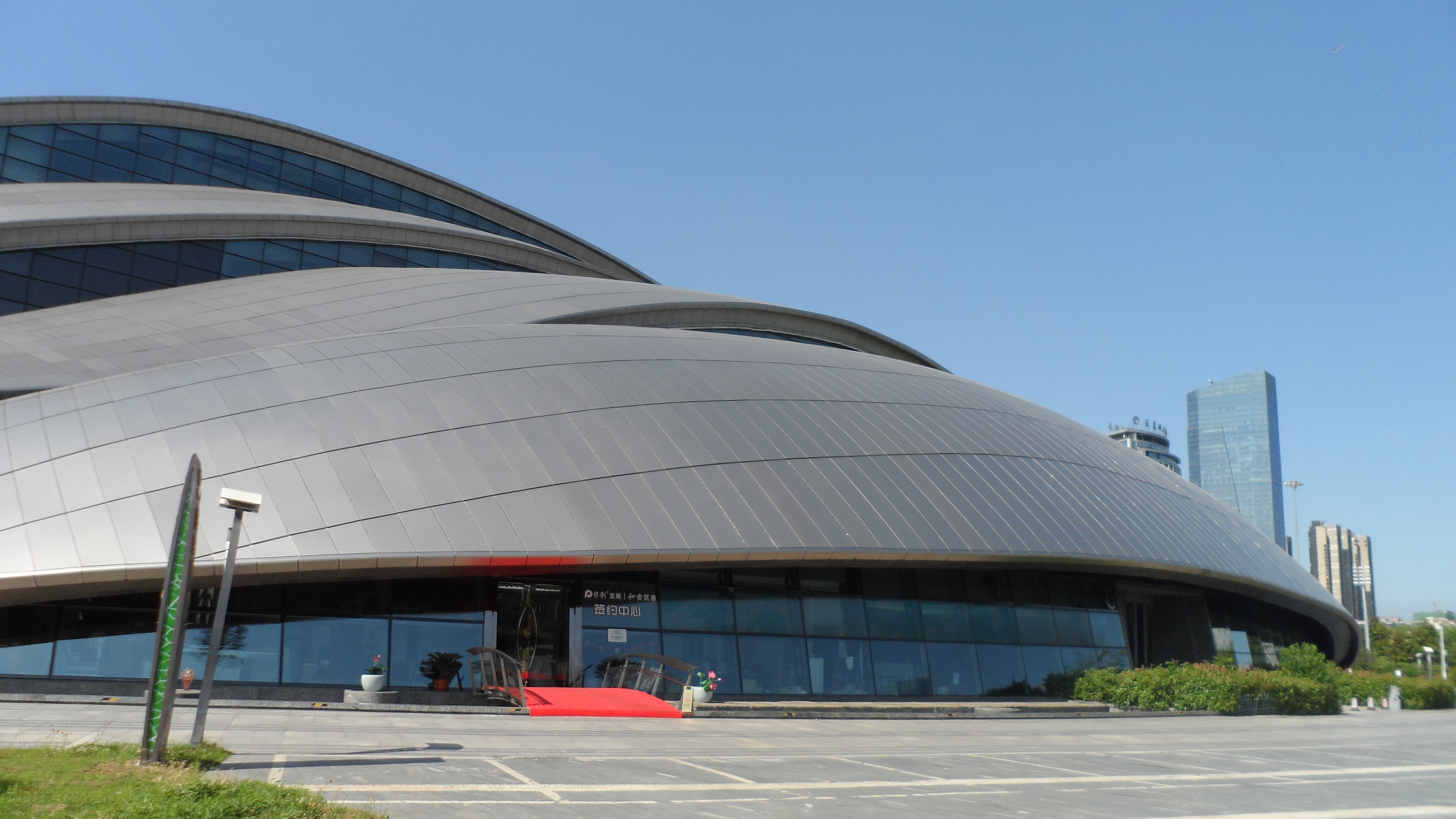
Hefei Grand Theatre

- Chao Lake, is the largest lake in Anhui and one of the five major freshwater lakes in China.
- Sanhe Town, ancient town which has a history of more than 2,500 years.
- Xiaoyaojin Park, a public park sitting on the ancient site of the Battle of Xiaoyao Ford.
- Temple of Lord Bao, built in 1066 near the tomb of Lord Bao.
- Li Hongzhang's Former Residence (Chinese: 李鸿章故居; pinyin: Lǐhóngzhāng gùjū), built in the late 19th century and fully restored by the 1990s.
- Hui Garden (Chinese: 徽园; pinyin: Huī yuán) (Opened to the public in September 2001)
- Children's Welfare Institute (a.k.a. "Social Welfare Institute"), children's orphanage
- Anhui Laomingguang Stadium, the home ground of Anhui Jiufang, but also used for other public sporting events.
- Hefei Olympic Sports Center Stadium, football stadium with a capacity of 60,000 people
- Hefei Grand Theatre, opera house

== Notable people ==
- Bao Zheng (999–1062), Northern Song dynasty bureaucrat and judge whose name has become synonymous with judicial wisdom and uprightness.
- Li Hongzhang (1823–1901), prominent late Qing dynasty bureaucrat and diplomat.
- Liu Mingchuan (1836–1896), statesman during the late Qing dynasty, first governor of Taiwan.
- Duan Qirui (1865–1936), the Provisional Chief Executive of Republic of China (in Beijing) from 24 November 1924, to 20 April 1926.
- Susan Wu Rathbone (1921–2019), community leader in Queens, New York.
- Yang Chen-Ning, (1922–2025), 1957 Nobel Physics Prize laureate, for their work on parity nonconservation of weak interaction. One of the two earliest Chinese to receive the prize.
- Wu Bangguo (b. 1941), Chinese politician.
- Li Keqiang (1955–2023), Premier of China 2013–2023.
- Yang Yuanqing (b. 1964), Chairman of Board of Lenovo.
- Han Qizhi, (b. 1970), first person to climb the Jin Mao Tower, then the tallest building in China.
- Jin Jing (b. 1981), Paralympic fencer.
- Xu Song (b. 1986), Chinese singer.
- Chen Xiao (b. 1987), actor.
- Yang Yang (b. 1991), actor.
- Hu Bingqing (b. 1992), actress.

== Sister cities ==
- Kurume, Fukuoka, Japan (1980)
- Freetown, Sierra Leone (1984)
- Bujumbura, Burundi (1986)
- Columbus, Ohio, United States (1988)
- Aalborg, Denmark (1989)
- Lleida, Catalonia, Spain (1998)
- Wonju, Gwandong, South Korea (2002)
- Darebin, Victoria, Australia (2003)
- Edmonton, Alberta, Canada (2004)
- Belfast, Northern Ireland, United Kingdom (2005)
- Osnabrück, Lower Saxony, Germany (2006)
- Ufa, Bashkortostan, Russia (2016)
- Huế, Vietnam

== See also ==
- List of twin towns and sister cities in China
- New first-tier city
