= Anhui Medical University =

Provincial public medical university in Hefei, Anhui, China

Coordinates: 31°50′55″N 117°15′48″E

- 安徽医科大学 (Chinese)
- Motto: 好學力行，造就良醫
- Type: Public university
- Established: 1926; 100 years ago
- President: Cao Yunxia
- Administrative staff: 3,733
- Students: 18,700
- Postgraduates: 3,160
- Location: Hefei, Anhui, China
- Website: ahmu.edu.cn

Chinese name
- Simplified Chinese: 安徽医科大学
- Traditional Chinese: 安徽醫科大學
Transcriptions
Standard Mandarin
- Hanyu Pinyin: Ānhuī Yīkē Dàxué

Anhui Medical University (AHMU; Chinese: 安徽医科大学) is a provincial public medical university in Hefei, Anhui, China. It is affiliated with the Anhui Provincial Government, and co-sponsored by the Anhui Provincial Government, the Ministry of Education, and the National Health Commission.

There are 16,673 students at the university, of whom 179 are enrolled in doctoral programs, 2,728 in master's programs, and 8,867 in undergraduate programs, plus 95 international students (including those from Hong Kong and Macao) and 7,187 students enrolled in the School of Extended Education.

== History ==
The predecessor of Anhui Medical University was Dongnan Medical College, established in 1926 in Shanghai. Moved first to Huaiyuan County, Anhui Province, at the end of 1949, and then to Hefei, the capital of Anhui Province, in 1952, Dongnan Medical College changed its name to Anhui Medical College.

In June 1996, approved by the National Committee on Education, Anhui Medical College was renamed Anhui Medical University.

== Organization ==
The university has 24 directly affiliated teaching units and ten affiliated hospitals, plus 42 clinical schools and 37 teaching hospitals. Other professional practicing and teaching bases connected to the university are over 100. The university at present offers 29 undergraduate programs and options.

Regarding advanced studies, the university has eight doctoral programs, five first-rate-discipline master's programs, 64 master's programs, and five professional degree programs. The university was authorized to offer an MD degree in clinical medicine and a professional degree in stomatology at master's level. The two degrees, especially that of MD, symbolize a major breakthrough in the advanced professional education in Anhui Province, making it possible for the university to cover in its curricula the full-range professional education at undergraduate, master's, and doctoral levels.

Three post-doctoral programs have been set up in pharmacy, clinical medicine, and public health and preventive medicine. The university owns one national key academic discipline and 22 provincial key academic disciplines, as well as 27 provincial key clinical-medicine disciplines and priorly-supported disciplines. It also owns two key laboratories of the Ministry of Education co-established by Anhui Province and the Ministry of Education, 13 laboratories co-established by the central (the Ministry of Finance) and local authorities, and 19 key laboratories (technological and engineering centers, and public scientific service facilities) at provincial level or above.

Besides, Anhui Medical University is the national base for the study of clinical medicines and chemical reagents. Two courses have been ranked among the National Elite Courses, and two programs approved nationally as the featured ones among the institutions of higher learning.

== Awards ==
The university typically has won a national second prize for teaching. Two faculty members of the university hold the directorships on the Committee of Dermatology and Venereology of Chinese Medical Society and on the Committee of Clinical Pharmacology of Chinese Pharmacological Society. Four faculty members have been elected to the international and national status of the project "International-, National-, and Provincial-level Talent." Two faculty members have been specified by the Ministry of Education as "Teaching Cadre" title holders. Five faculty members have been designated by the Ministry of Health as "Young and/or Middle-aged Experts with Spectacular Contributions." Two faculty members hold the title of "Wanjiang Scholar", a specially appointed professorship. Five faculty members have been singled out as experts on the Advisory Board of College-level Medical and Pharmaceutical Disciplines of the Ministry of Education.

Again, Anhui Medical university has launched the organization of "Overseas Legion" for an extensive highest-level talent attraction, specifically, for those from abroad, as indicated by the name of the organization. Its library is the provincial Center Library in Anhui Province, which shares biological and medical literature nationwide via cyber-space or internet.

== Research ==
The university is the owner of 46 research institutes at provincial and university levels. Fifteen national-level learned journals are published and issued nationwide. In the recent five years, the university has taken on a total of 209 scientific research programs, among which are such renowned ones as "863" and "973" Projects, Projects Supported by National Science and Technology, and National Natural Sciences Foundation Project.

The university has won 76 provincial prizes in scientific research and, in 2005 and 2006 consecutively, won the first prizes of Chinese Medical Science and Technology. In 2007, the university won each one of the second prizes of National Science Progress and the first prizes of College-level Science and Technology of the Ministry of Education.

== International relations ==
Substantial exchange has been fostered between the university and colleges or universities in Hong Kong and Macao, and other countries. Exchange programs of scholars, students, and technical information have been established for collaboration in scientific research.

== Campus ==
The Anhui Medical University consists of two campuses: the main campus and the southern campus. The total campus covers an area of 860000 square meters and floor space of about 700 thousand square meters. You can walk through the whole campus in 20 minutes. The campus is on South No.1 Ring-Road of Hefei.

== Administration ==
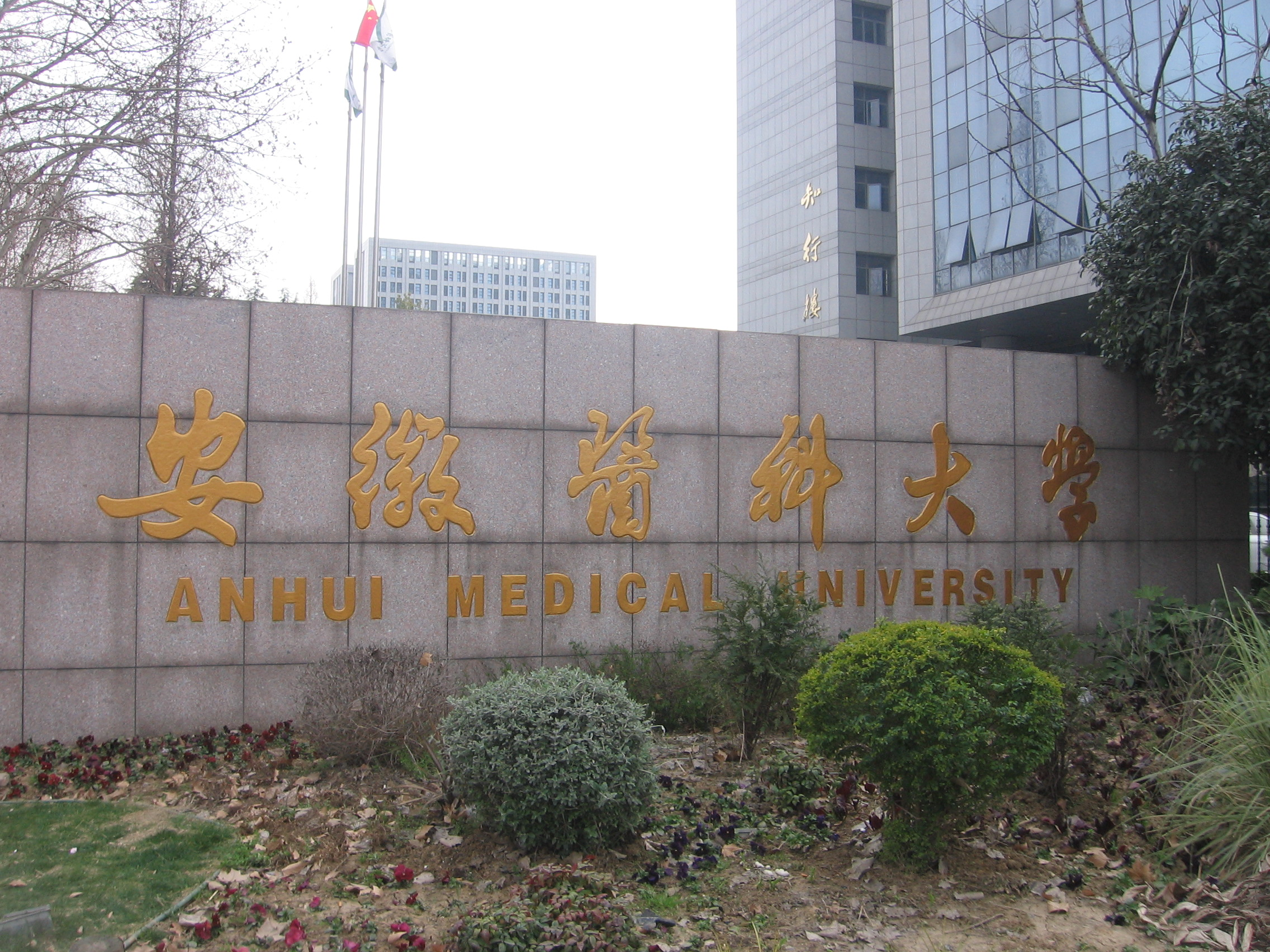
Main Entrance

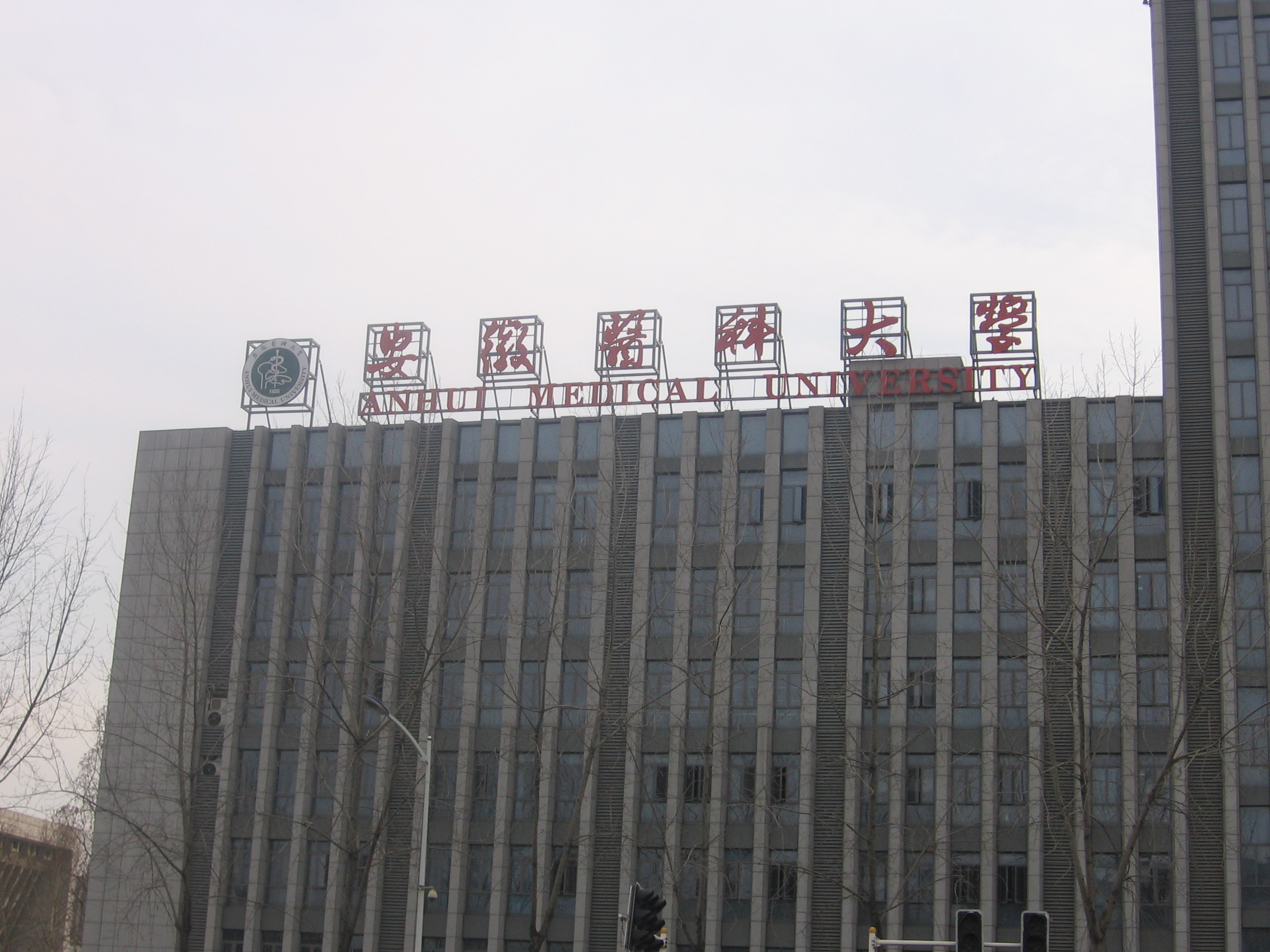
Main Building

=== Colleges and departments ===
==== Colleges ====
The first Clinical College

- School of Public Health
- College of Stomatology
- College of Health Administration
- College of Pharmacy
- College of Nursing
- College of Basic Medicine
- College of Humanities and Social Science

==== Departments ====
- Department of Clinical Medicine
- Department of Medical Psychology
- Department of Rehabilitation
- Department of Iconography
- Department of Anesthesia
- Department of Medical Cosmetic Science
- School of International Students
