= Hefei University of Technology =

Public university in Hefei, Anhui, China

Coordinates: 31.84744°N 117.29562°E

- 合肥工业大学
- Motto: 厚德、笃学、崇实、尚新
- Motto in English: Pursuing virtue and knowledge, seeking truth and innovation
- Type: Public
- Established: 1945; 81 years ago
- President: Zheng Lei
- Administrative staff: 3,768
- Students: 25,500
- Location: Hefei, Anhui, China
- Campus: Urban, 3 Campus
- Website: hfut.edu.cn

Chinese name
- Simplified Chinese: 合肥工业大学
- Traditional Chinese: 合肥工業大學
Transcriptions
Standard Mandarin
- Hanyu Pinyin: Héféi Gōngyè Dàxué

The Hefei University of Technology (HFUT; Chinese: 合肥工业大学) is a public university in Hefei, Anhui, China. It is affiliated with the Ministry of Education, and co-funded with the Anhui Provincial People's Government, the Ministry of Industry and Information Technology, and SASTIND. The university is part of the Double First-Class Construction and Project 211.

At present, HFUT enrolls 29,480 undergraduate students and 11,800 graduate students.

== Campuses and departments ==
HFUT has four campuses, namely, Tunxilu, Lu'anlu, Feicuihu and Xuancheng, covering an area of about 3,417,390 m^{2}. The first three campuses are all located in Hefei, the provincial capital of Anhui, and the fourth in Xuancheng, a city about 194 kilometers away from Hefei.

Campuses in Hefei have 19 schools covering a wide range of fields with a strong focus on engineering science. The schools offer 82 undergraduate programs, 32 first-level disciples with authorization to confer master's degrees, 12 first-level disciples for doctoral programs as well as 12 post-doctoral programs. 4 disciplines are selected as national key disciplines, 28 provincial key disciplines. The university has 1 state key lab, 1 national engineering lab, 4 national university-industry joint engineering research centers and 46 research centers at the ministerial or provincial level as well as 1 national A-level architectural design and research institute. The campus in Xuancheng has 5 departments.

== Participation in Education and Development Plan for Outstanding Engineers ==
It has made achievements in student education. Throughout the years, key disciplines, courses, textbooks, teaching and experiment centers, teaching staff of HFUT have won awards at all levels. It is among the first batch of 61 pilot colleges and universities to conduct the Education and Development Plan for Outstanding Engineers initiated by the Ministry of Education. About 200 projects carried out by HFUT students have been funded by the National University Student Innovation Program.

In 2013, the university had an annual research funding in sciences of over RMB 447 Million. Total number of applications for invention patents was 357, of which 204 have been licensed.

== Schools and Colleges in HFUT ==
- School of Marxism
- School of Electronic Science and Applied Physics
- Technician College of Hefei University and Technology
- College of Continuing Education
- Department of Sports and Physical Education
- School of Microelectronics
- School of Foreign Languages
- School of Mathematics
- School of Software
- School of Traffic and Transportation Engineering
- School of Civil Engineering
- School of Management
- School of Computer Science and Information Engineering (School of artificial Intelligence)
- School of Materials Science & Engineering
- School of Architecture and Arts
- School of Economics
- School of Mechanical and Automotive Engineering
- School of Biotechnology and Food Engineering
- School of Chemistry and Chemical Engineering
- School of Electrical Engineering and Automation
- School of Resources and Environmental Engineering

== Notable alumni ==
- Miao Wei - Minister of Industry and Information Technology of the People's Republic of China
- Ni Yuefeng - Minister of General Administration Customs of the People's Republic of China
- Ye Qing - Chairman of China Shenhua Group
- Li Fusheng - Chairman of China Xuji Corporation
