= Chao Lake archaeological sites =

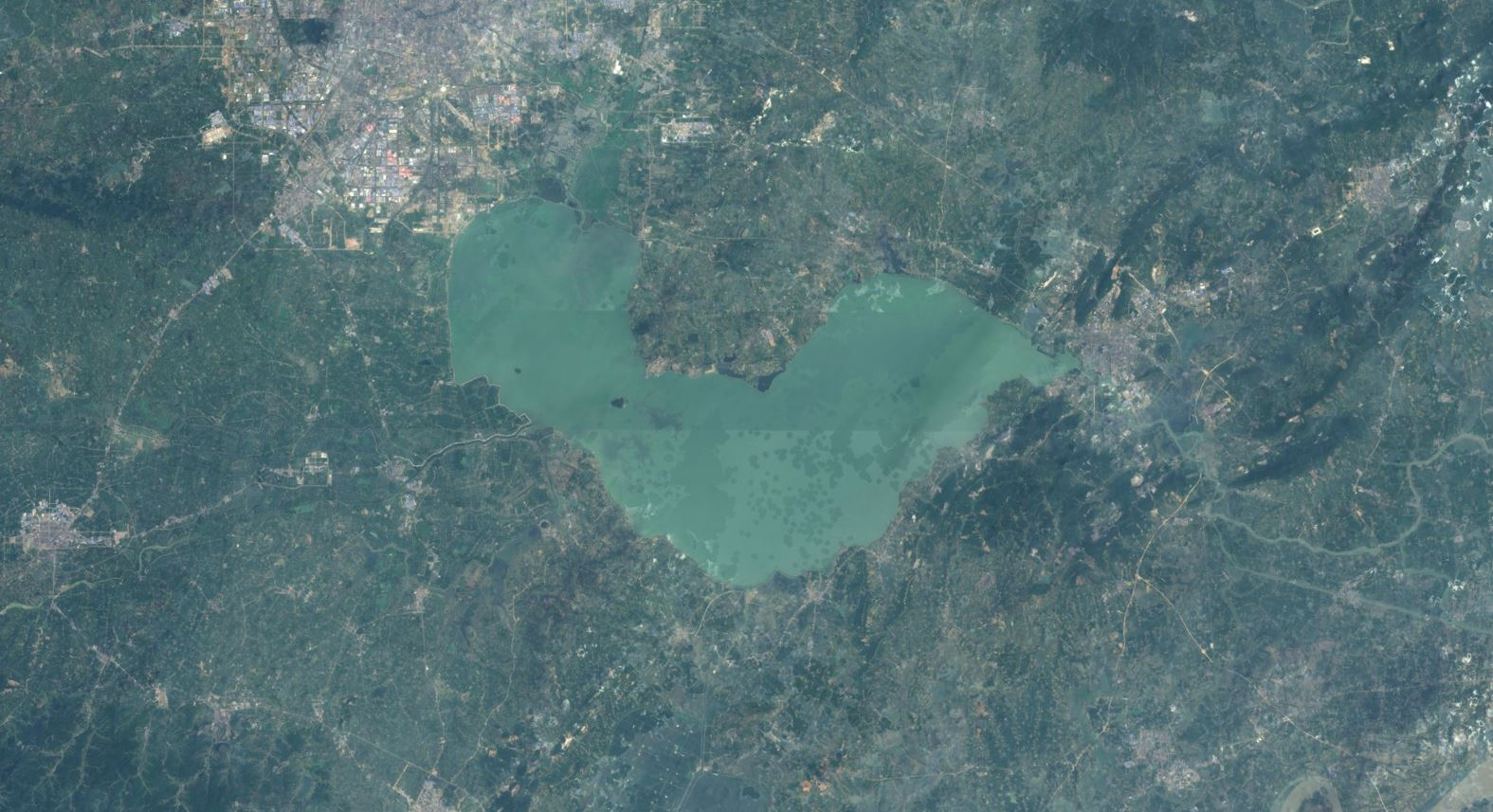
Chao Lake image taken by NASA

Chao Lake basin (31°31′47.1″N, 117°22′29.8″E) includes the geographical area around Chao Lake (Chinese: 巢湖 Chao Hu), 15km from Hefei City, China. It is the largest lake in Anhui province, and one of the five major freshwater lakes in China. The lake has formed for about 10 thousand years, with currently 5 million residents in the surrounding communities. Located in the monsoon climate zone, the weather has given rise to agriculture and economy as well as ruined settlements.

Anhui Province on map of People's Republic of China

Chao Lake is used as source of drinking water, irrigation, and fisheries, while its surrounding deciduous forests and fertile soil were foundation of agricultural development. There are ten rivers (Hangbu, Fengle, Pai, Nanfei, Dianbu, Zhegao, Niutun, Yuxi, Xi and Zhao) and five mountains (Yinpingshan, Fenghuangshan, Yefushan, Dabieshan and Fanghushan) surrounding the lake, allowing settlement and activity areas of ancient communities. Hundreds of archaeological sites of ancient settlements are discovered in the Chao Lake basin. In the Chao Lake basin, there are 52 sites from the Neolithic Age, 114 sites from Shang-Zhou Dynasties, and 60 sites from Han Dynasty.

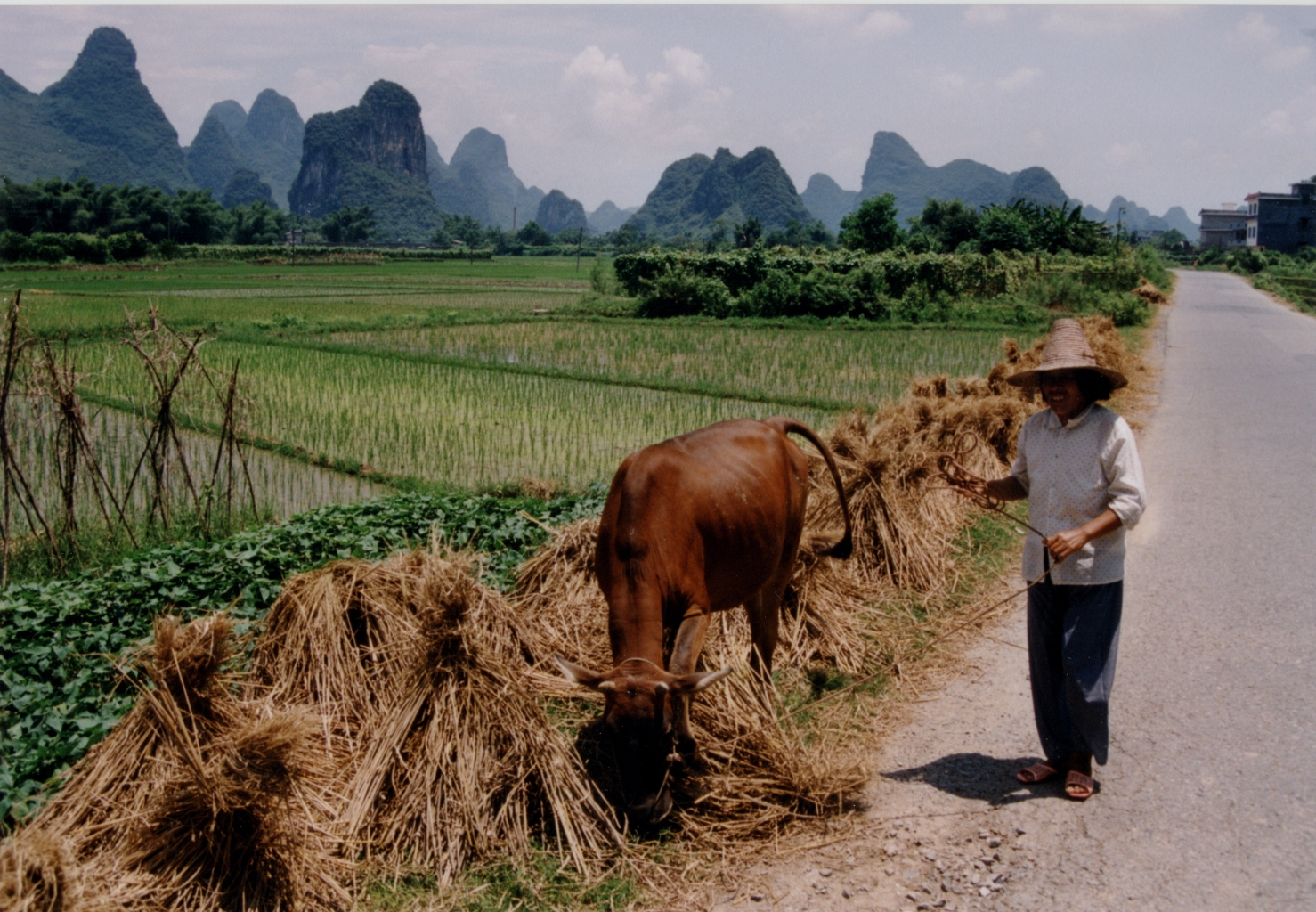
Paddy rice field in China with farmer

Agriculture thrived since the Holocene when human activities influenced natural vegetation and fire use. Paddy rice originated in the basin during the Neolithic Age and spread to East Asia. The basin is also constantly occupied by wars between North and South due to its geographical structure with waterways and mountains in the middle of Eastern China.

== Holocene environment ==
Sediment from Chao lake show three stages of evolvement of Holocene climate. The first stage was warm and dry weather with low-water levels following the late-glacial period from 9870 to 6040 calibrated years BP. The relative dry climate induced natural fire, but also increased human fire activity with charcoal usage.

The second stage was humid climate with flourishing vegetation from 6040 to 4960 cal. a BP. The third stage was the Holocene Optimum, characterized by optimal water and heat conditions, from 5840 to 5500 cal. a. BP.

Nanling Village is about 2km southwest to Chao Lake. Archaeologists study Holocene vegetation in relation to human activity. Human influence on vegetation increased over time from 10,500 cal B.P. to after 3,750 cal B.P. based on transition from an evergreen forest to terrestrial herbs. Increased farming and population pressure during the time period reduced natural vegetation by turning forests into cultivated land. Local Agriculture included rice, wheat, cotton, tobacco.

== Neolithic age ==
The Linjiatan Culture (5.6-5.3 ka BP) was the earliest known Neolithic culture in Chao Lake Basin. The Wu and Chu kingdoms, representing North and South China, engaged in warfare for the jade production technology developed by the Linjiatan Culture.

Three prehistoric culture followed: the Majiabang (7.0–5.8 ka B.P.), Songze (ca. 5.8–5.2 ka B.P.) and Liangzhu (5.2–4.0 ka B.P.).

Chao Lake basin and the larger area at the lower reaches of the Yangtze River is suggested as one of the origin sites of paddy rice from reconstruction of diet and recovery of paddy fields.

== Shang-Zhou dynasties ==
The Shang-Zhou Dynasties (3.55-2.72 ka BP) was the most culturally flourished era for the Chao Lake basin, with around 120 archaeological sites. The increase in population also caused clearance of surrounding forests to transform land for agricultural and residential use. Settlement across time and space due to factors in climate change, river flow, geological distribution, productive force, and economic structure. Settlement areas were closer to rivers during the Neolithic Age, and then moved to warmer and more humid areas during the Shang-Zhou dynasties. Microclimates near rivers and foothills supplied agriculture. Economic growth also boosted settlement in high-altitude area with more fertile soil.

== Han dynasty ==
The Han Dynasty (2.15-1.73 ka BP) thrived after the Shang-Zhou Dynasties. Chao Lake’s culture declined during this period due to climate change.

Between East Han Dynasty and West Han Dynasty was the age of the Three Kingdoms. Cao Cao, the emperor of the Wei Kingdom, dug the Chao-Fei channel to connect Chao Lake to the Yangtze River. The channel connected multiple water ways in the area but decayed after the Han Dynasty as economic center shifted.

Bronze and jade artifacts, potteries, and silverware evolved with designs of Square pattern, Hongwen pattern, and Shenwen pattern.

Towards the end of the Han Dynasty, natural disasters such as floods and earthquakes destroyed agriculture and economy, inciting relocation. Chinese economic and cultural development shifted south, where the climate is warmer and more stable. The division of South and North caused political struggles, which also stimulated migrations. Tangzui Site, a flourished city, was flooded by water in ~2090 BP. A sharp decrease in population occurred as communities move to areas with more moderate weather conditions and economic stability.

After Han, Chao Lake Basin remained a critical point for warfare between the South and North with its crucial geographical and climate conditions.
