= Miào (surname) =

Miào (simplified Chinese: 缪; traditional Chinese: 繆) is a Chinese surname.

== Notable people ==
- Miao Boying (缪伯英; 1899–1929), Chinese teacher, writer and revolutionary who became the first woman to join the Communist Party
- Cora Miao (繆騫人; born 1958), Hong Kong actress
- Miao Fu (繆輔), Ming Dynasty painter
- Guowang Miao (缪国往), associate professor at KTH Royal Institute of Technology, Sweden
- Miao Jianmin (缪建民; born 1965), Chinese executive and politician
- Miao Peinan (繆培南; 1895–1970), Chinese Kuomintang general
- Miao Quansun (繆荃孫; 1844–1919), Chinese philologist and librarian
- Miao Ruilin (缪瑞林; born 1964), Chinese politician, former Mayor of Nanjing
- Wilson Miao (繆宗晏; born 1987), Canadian politician
- Miao Xiaochun (缪晓春; born 1964), Chinese artist and photographer
- Miao Xiyong (繆希雍; 1546–1627), Ming Dynasty physician
- Miao Xuegang (缪学刚; born 1962), Chinese former politician
