= Sanhe, Feixi County =

Sanhe 三河镇
- Town
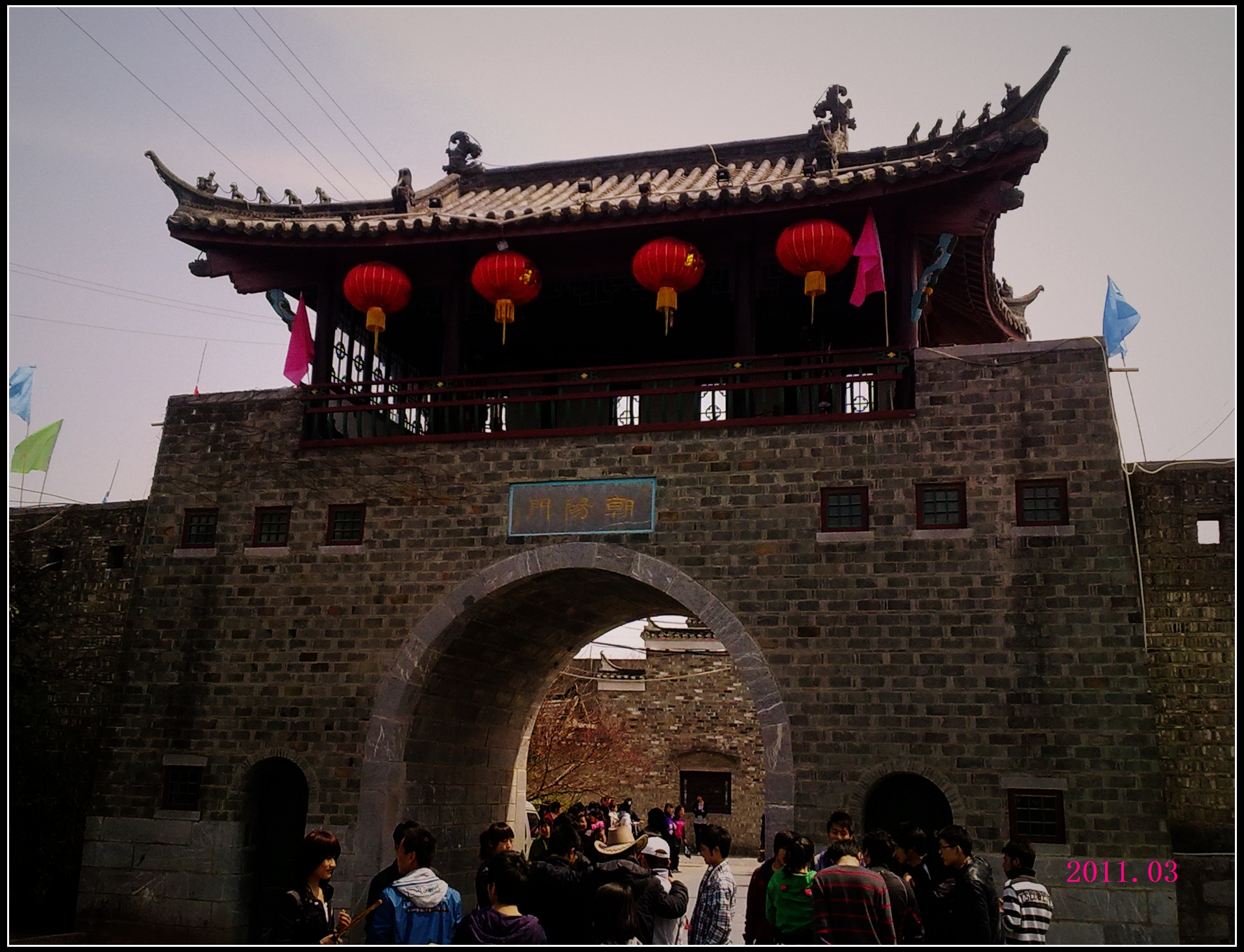
- Sanhe old town East Gate

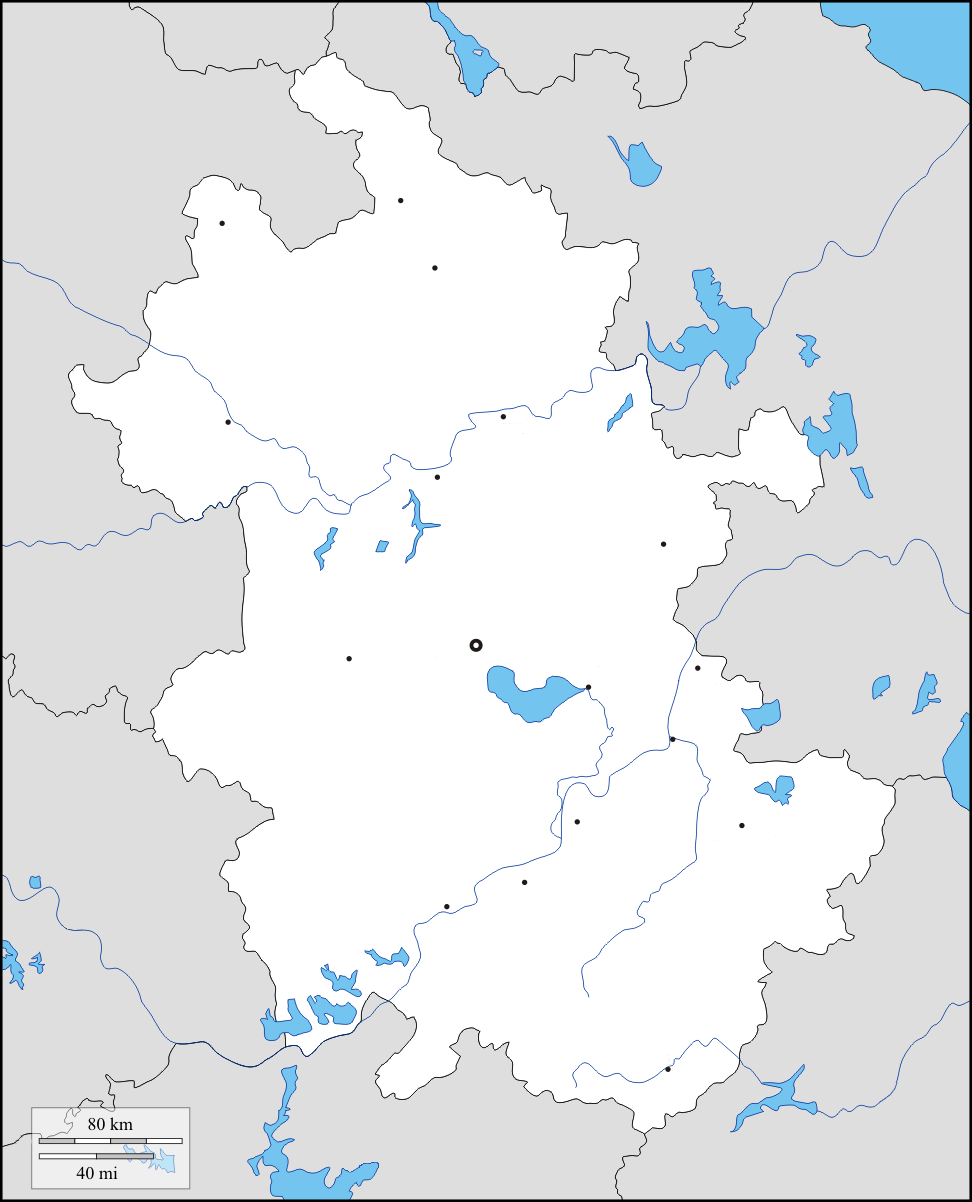
- Location in Anhui Sanhe (China)
- Coordinates: 31°30′34″N 117°14′19″E
- Country: People's Republic of China
- Province: Anhui
- Prefecture-level city: Hefei
- County: Feixi

Area
  - Total: 72 km^{2} (28 sq mi)
- Elevation: 8 m (26 ft)

Population (2009)
  - Total: 73,000
  - Density: 1,000/km^{2} (2,600/sq mi)
- Time zone: UTC+8 (China Standard)
- Area code: 0551

Sanhe (simplified Chinese: 三河镇; traditional Chinese: 三河鎮; pinyin: Sānhé Zhèn) is a town in south-central Anhui province, People's Republic of China. Located 35 kilometres (22 mi) south of the provincial capital of Hefei and only 9 kilometres (5.6 mi) from the shores of Chao Lake, it is under the administration of Feixi County. In 2009, it had a population of 73,000 and an area of 72 square kilometres (28 sq mi). As of 2018, it administered 14 residential communities (社区) and 12 villages.

== Name ==
The name of the town literally means 'Three Rivers', referring to the Fengle (丰乐河), Hangbu (杭埠河), and Xiaonan Rivers (小南河).

== History ==
The area around the town was the scene of the 1858 Battle of Sanhe during the Taiping Revolt against the Qing.

== Divisions ==
Within its borders lies the Sanhe Old Town (三河古镇), which occupies more than 41% of the town's population and yet only 4.71 square kilometres (1.82 sq mi) of the area, and for this reason is one of the nationally designated historical and cultural towns (中国历史文化名镇).

== Transport ==
The Anhui Provincial Road 103, running from Tongling to Hefei, passes through the area.

== See also ==
- List of township-level divisions of Anhui
