= Hangbu River =

River in Anhui, China

Coordinates: 31°31′49″N 117°17′17″E

The Hangbu (Chinese: 杭埠河) is a river of Feixi County, Anhui province, China. It originates on the north slope of the Dabie Mountains and is the largest of 33 tributaries of Lake Chaohu. The river flows into its western bank in a northeasterly direction and flows through the township of Sanhe. Longhekou Reservoir was built on the river in 1958.
