= Songze culture =

Neolithic culture in China

Songze Culture
- Geographical range: Eastern China
- Period: Neolithic China
- Dates: c. 3800 – c. 3300 BCE
- Preceded by: Majiabang culture
- Followed by: Liangzhu culture

Chinese name
- Traditional Chinese: 崧澤文化
- Simplified Chinese: 崧泽文化
Transcriptions
Standard Mandarin
- Hanyu Pinyin: Sōngzé wénhuà

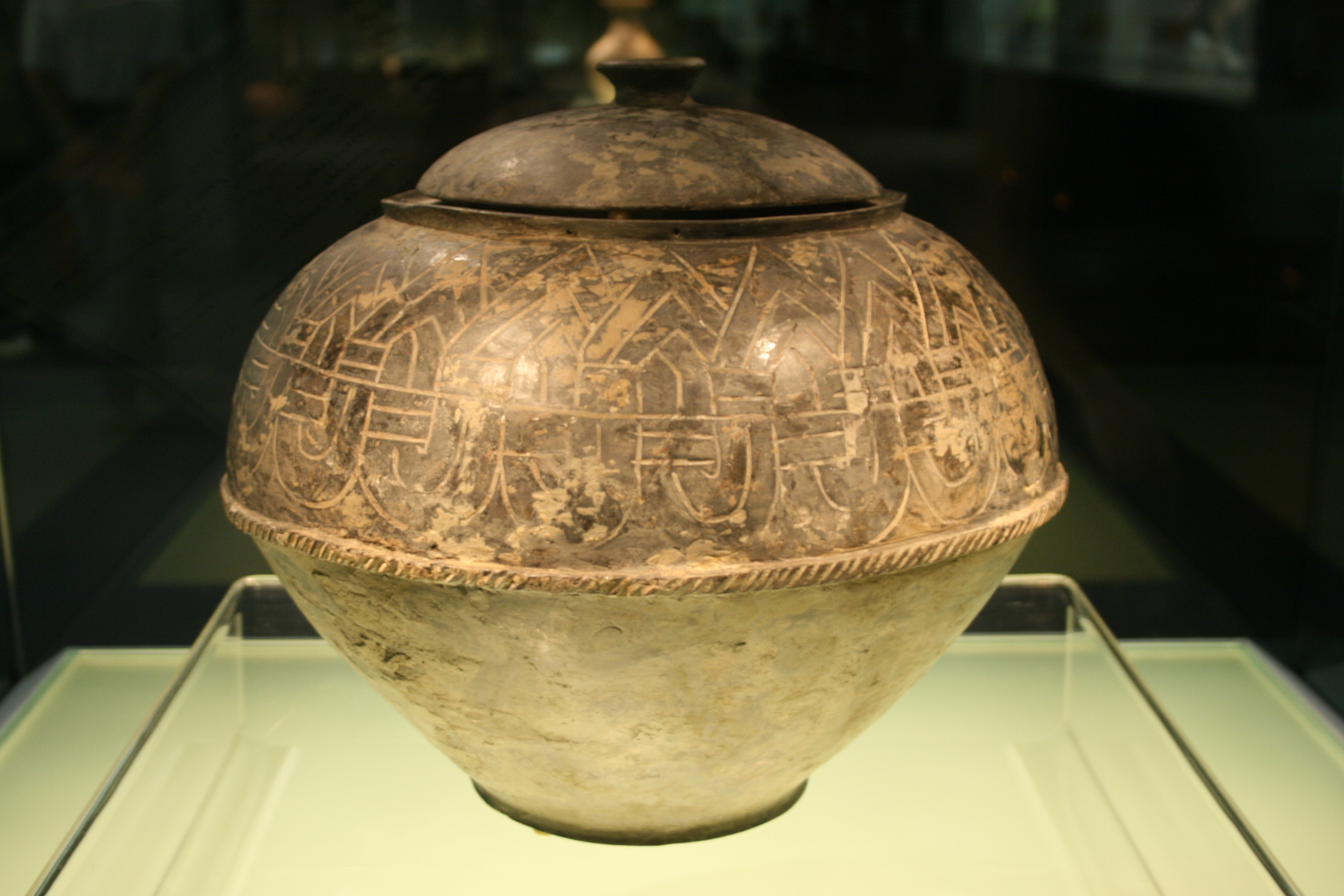
Black pottery covered jar with inscribed design. Songze culture (c. 3,800—3,200 BCE) Excavated from Siqian Village, Qingpu County, Shanghai. Shanghai Museum

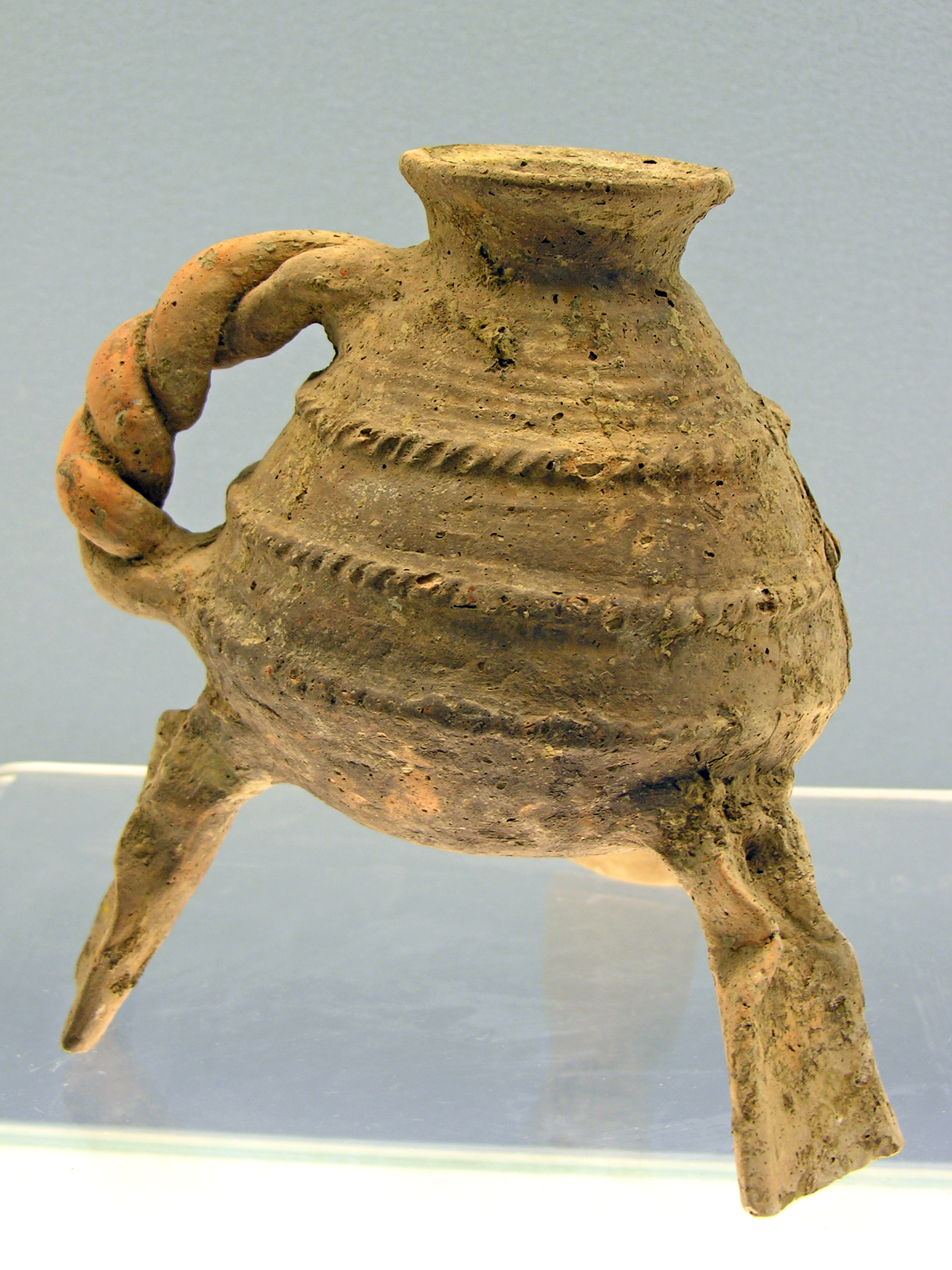
Grey pottery wine vessel of the Songze culture, 3800~3200 BCE

The Songze Culture was a Neolithic culture that existed between 3800 and 3300 BCE in the Lake Tai area near Shanghai.

== Dates ==
Three radiocarbon dates were taken from Songze culture layers at Jiangli near Lake Tai. Two of the dates were obtained from charred rice grains, returning dates of 3360–3090 BCE and 3540–3370 BCE. The third date was taken from knotgrass and produced a date of 3660–3620 BCE. Although it is accepted to be the successor of the Majiabang culture, others have suggested that Songze was a successor phase to the Hemudu culture.

== Sites ==
=== Songze ===
In 1957, archaeologists discovered a site north of Songze Village near Zhaoxiang Town Chinese: 赵巷镇 in Shanghai's Qingpu District. Excavations have been conducted throughout 1961, 1974–1976, 1987, 1994–1995, and 2004. These revealed three cultural layers: the most recent had pottery from the Spring and Autumn period; the middle layer was a cemetery with 148 graves and numerous artefacts; the oldest layer belonged to a village of the Majiabang culture.

=== Nanhebang ===
92 graves have been excavated from a Songze cemetery at Nanhebang.

=== Pishan ===
The Pishan cemetery contained 61 burials.

=== Dongshan ===
Dongshan Village is located near Jingang Town 18 km west of Zhangjiagang. It was discovered in 1989 and has undergone excavations by the Suzhou Museum (1989–1990), followed by two large rescue excavations led by the Nanjing Museum in 2008–2009. The site is divided into three areas: area 1 was a small cemetery of 27 burials, all of which had different quantities of grave goods, which has been used to suggest the existence of a stratified society; area 2 was a residential comprising five buildings in the centre of the site; area 3 was another burial ground in the site's west, with 10 tombs.

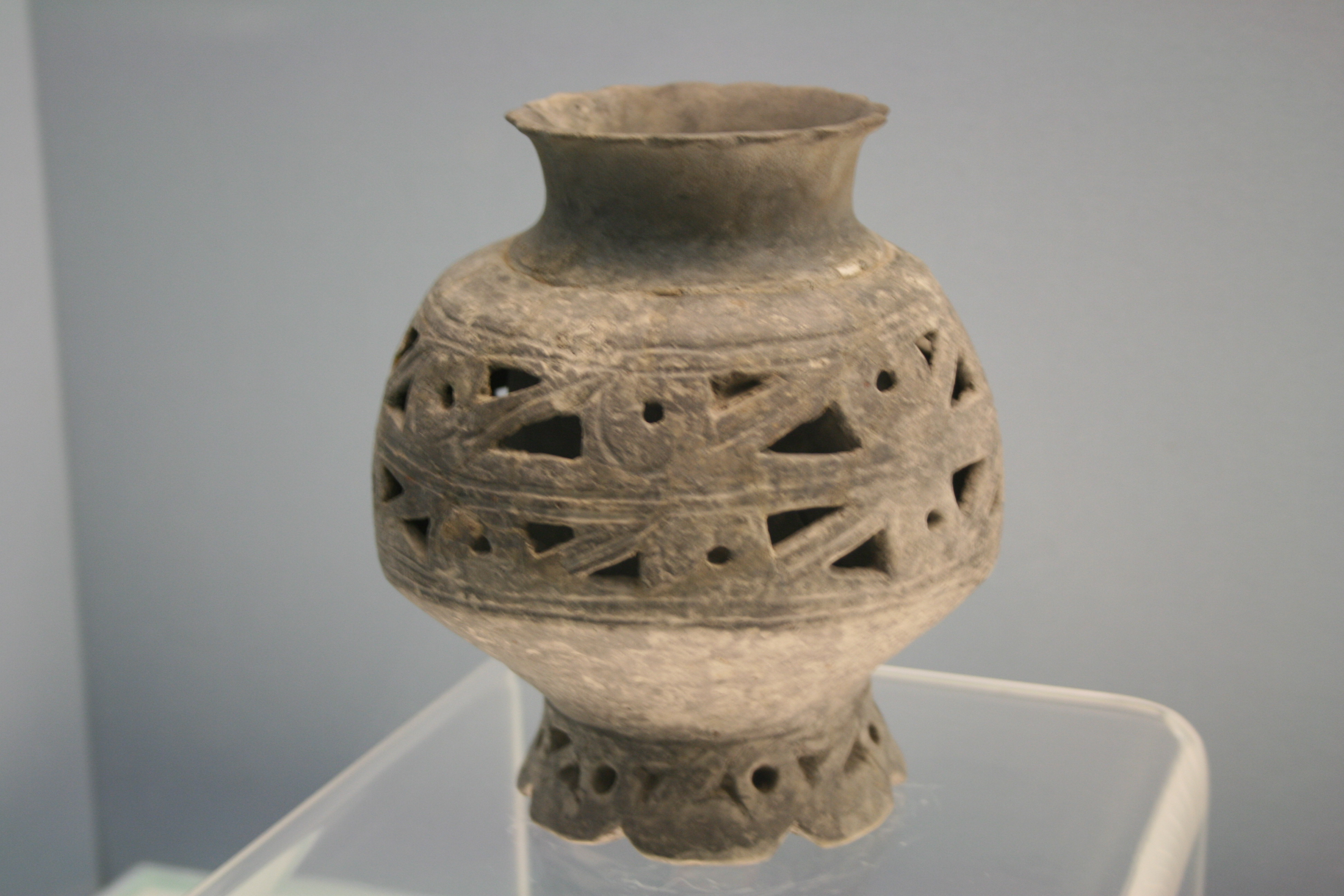
Songze culture pottery

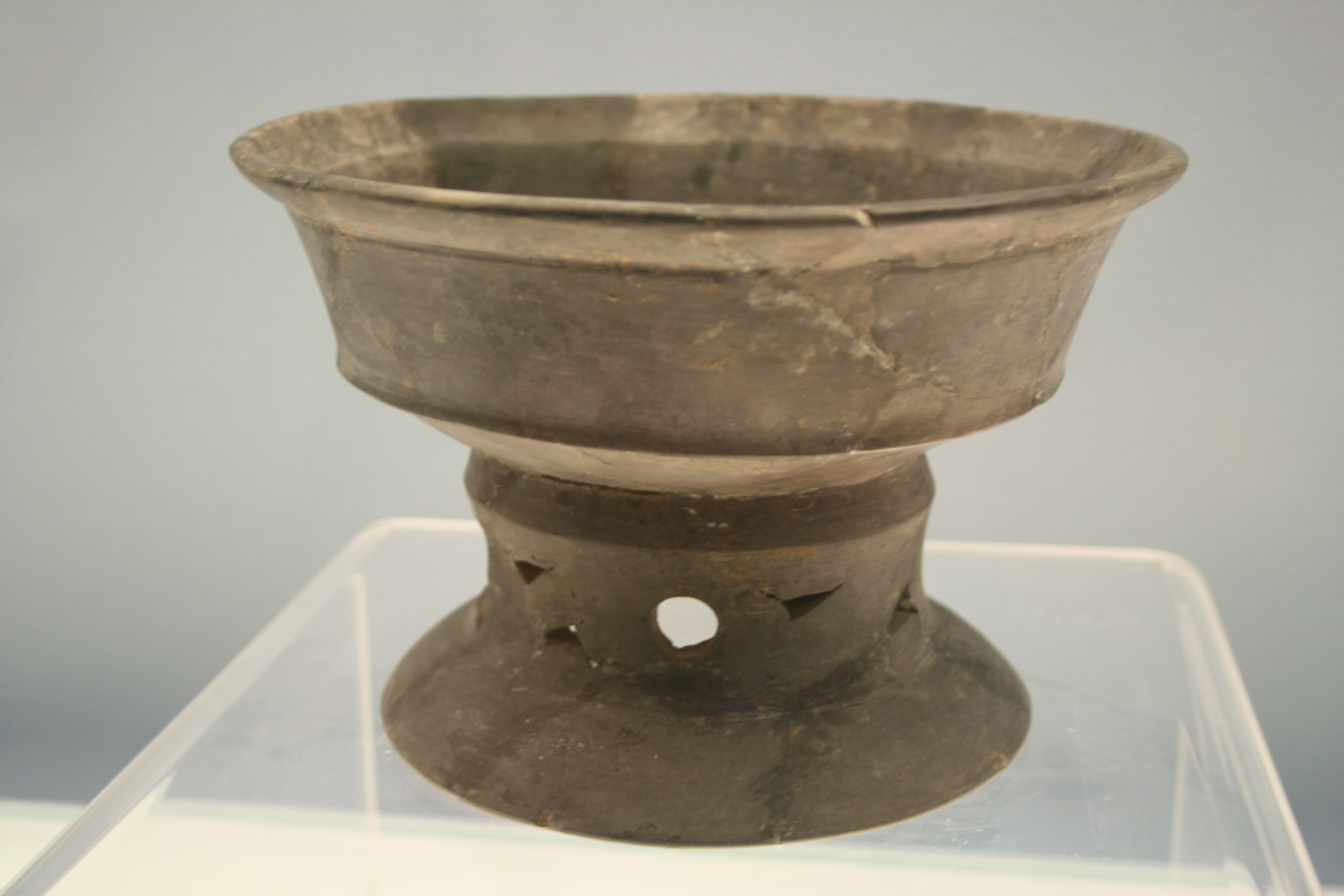
Songze culture pottery

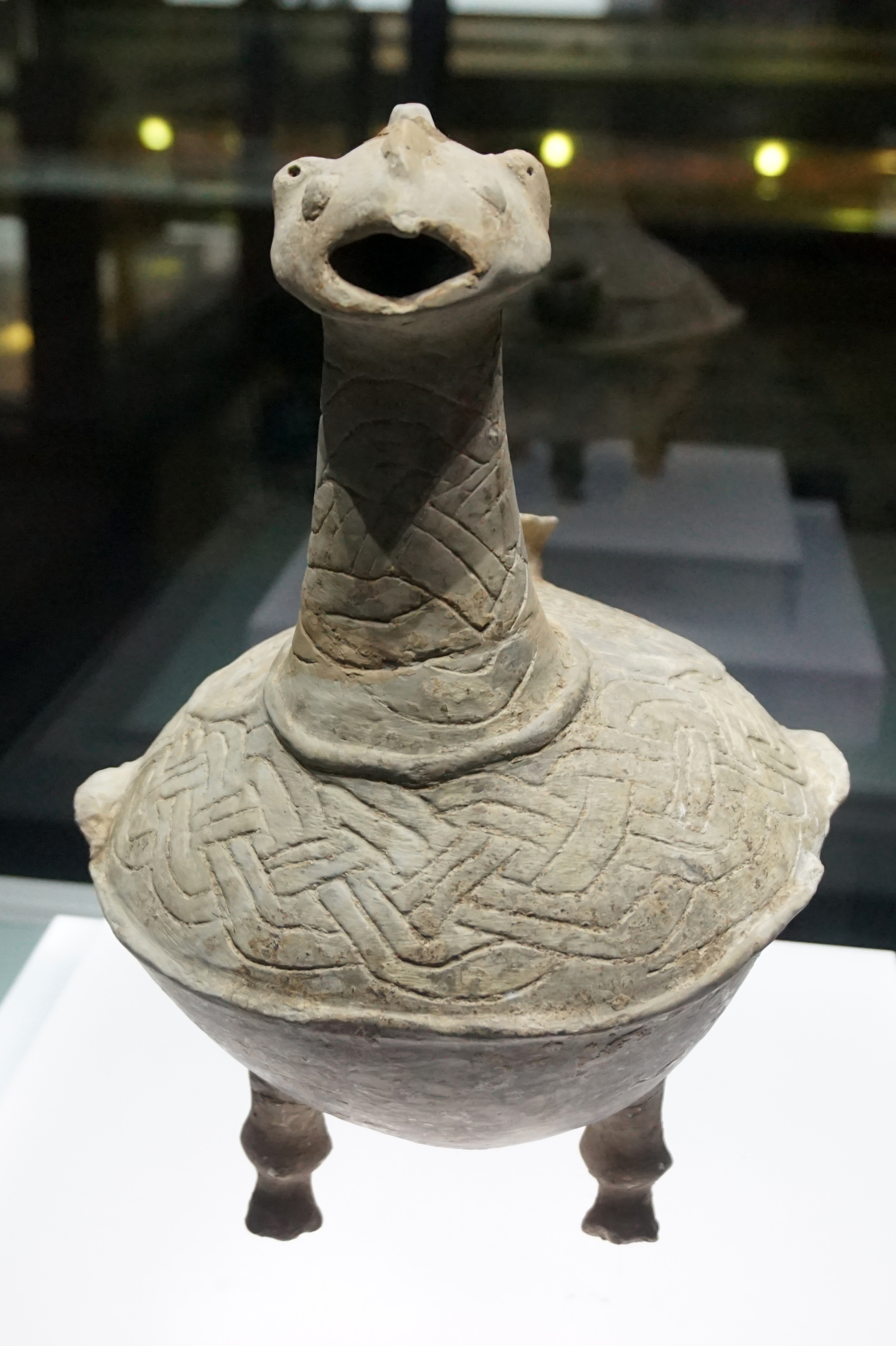
Songze culture, bird-shaped pottery
