= Li Xiaowei =

Chinese computer scientist

Li Xiaowei (Chinese: 李晓维; born September 1964 in Feixi, Anhui) is a Chinese computer scientist. He is a professor and the Executive Deputy Director of the State Key Lab of Computer Architecture, Institute of Computing Technology, Chinese Academy of Sciences (ICT, CAS).

== Professional activities ==
Li has been vice-chair of the IEEE Asian Pacific Regional Test Technology Technical Council since January 2004. He was steering committee chair for the IEEE workshop on RTL and High-Level Testing from 2007 to 2010, and the IEEE Asian Test Symposium from 2011 to 2013. Li is also currently an executive member of the China Computer Federation (CCF), chair of the CCF Technical committee on Fault-tolerant computing and Associate Editor-in-Chief for the Journal of Computer Science and Technology..

== Honors and awards ==
Li received the National Technology Invention Award (2012), by State Council of China, the China Quality Technical Award (2011), by China Association for Quality, the Wang Xuan Prize (2008), by China Computer Federation, and the Outstanding Science and Technology Achievement Prize (2004), by Chinese Academy of Sciences.
