= Han Xiancong =

Chinese politician

- 韩先聪

Vice-Chairman of the Anhui Provincial Committee of the Chinese People's Political Consultative Conference
- In office January 2013 – July 2014
- Chairman: Wang Mingfang

Secretary-General of Anhui Provincial Government
- In office February 2012 – January 2013
- Preceded by: Liang Weiguo
- Succeeded by: Shao Guohe

Communist Party Secretary of Chuzhou
- In office February 2008 – February 2012
- Preceded by: Wang Guocai
- Succeeded by: Jiang Shan

Communist Party Secretary of Anqing
- In office April 2003 – February 2008
- Preceded by: Zhao Shucong
- Succeeded by: Zhu Duwen

Personal details
- Born: November 1955 (age 70) Feixi County, Anhui, China
- Party: Chinese Communist Party (1984–2014; expelled)
- Education: Anhui Agricultural University

Chinese name
- Traditional Chinese: 韓先聰
- Simplified Chinese: 韩先聪
Transcriptions
Standard Mandarin
- Hanyu Pinyin: Hán Xiāncōng

Han Xiancong (Chinese: 韩先聪; born November 1955) is a former Chinese politician from Anhui province. He was best known for his term as the Chinese Communist Party Committee Secretary of the cities of Anqing and Chuzhou. From 2013 to 2014 he served as the vice-chairman of the Anhui provincial People's Political Consultative Conference, a largely ceremonial legislative consultation body. He was later investigated for corruption and indicted on criminal charges of bribery.

== Career ==
Han was born and raised in Feixi County, Anhui. He graduated from Anhui Agricultural University.

Shortly after the conclusion of the Cultural Revolution, Han worked in his hometown as a teacher at a local school. Han began working in January 1982 in the provincial agriculture and fisheries department. He joined the Chinese Communist Party in July 1984. In 1987, he entered the provincial government as a staffer of the General Office, and in 1991, he began working for the provincial agricultural economics commission.

Han served as the Deputy Party Secretary of Chaohu from October 1994 to July 1996. In August 1999, Han was transferred laterally to Anqing, where he ascended to become the party chief in April 2003. Than he served as the party chief of Chuzhou between February 2008 to February 2012. In February 2012, he was promoted to become the Secretary-general of the Government of Anhui Province.

In January 2013, Han, then 58, was appointed as the vice-chairman of Anhui Provincial Committee of the Chinese People's Political Consultative Conference.

On July 12, 2014, Han was being investigated by the Central Commission for Discipline Inspection (CCDI) for "serious violations of laws and regulations". On December 11, 2014, the CCDI announced the expulsion of Han from the Chinese Communist Party; the investigation concluded that Han abused his power to seek gain for others, took "massive bribes", and presided over "serious loss of state assets". It was also said that he violated the Eight-point Regulation and regularly accepted elaborate dinner invitations paid for by public funds. In December 2015, Han was indicted on criminal charges of bribery and tried in the southeastern city of Nanping, in Fujian province. Han was sentenced to 16 years in prison in November 2016.

Government offices
Preceded by Zhao Shucong	Mayor of Anqing; 2001–2003	Succeeded by Zhu Duwen
Preceded by Liang Weiguo	Secretary-General of Anhui Provincial Government; 2012–2013	Succeeded by Shao Guohe
Party political offices
Preceded by Zhao Shucong	Communist Party Secretary of Anqing; 2003–2008	Succeeded by Zhu Duwen
Preceded by Wang Guocai	Communist Party Secretary of Chuzhou; 2008–2012	Succeeded by Jiang Shan
Assembly seats
Preceded by Zhou Gongshun	Chairman of the Standing Committee of Anqing Municipal People's Congress; 2004–2008	Succeeded by Zhu Duwen
Preceded by Wang Guocai	Chairman of the Standing Committee of Chuzhou Municipal People's Congress; 2008–2012	Succeeded by Li Yaocai
