= Five Lakes (China) =

Chinese geographical concept

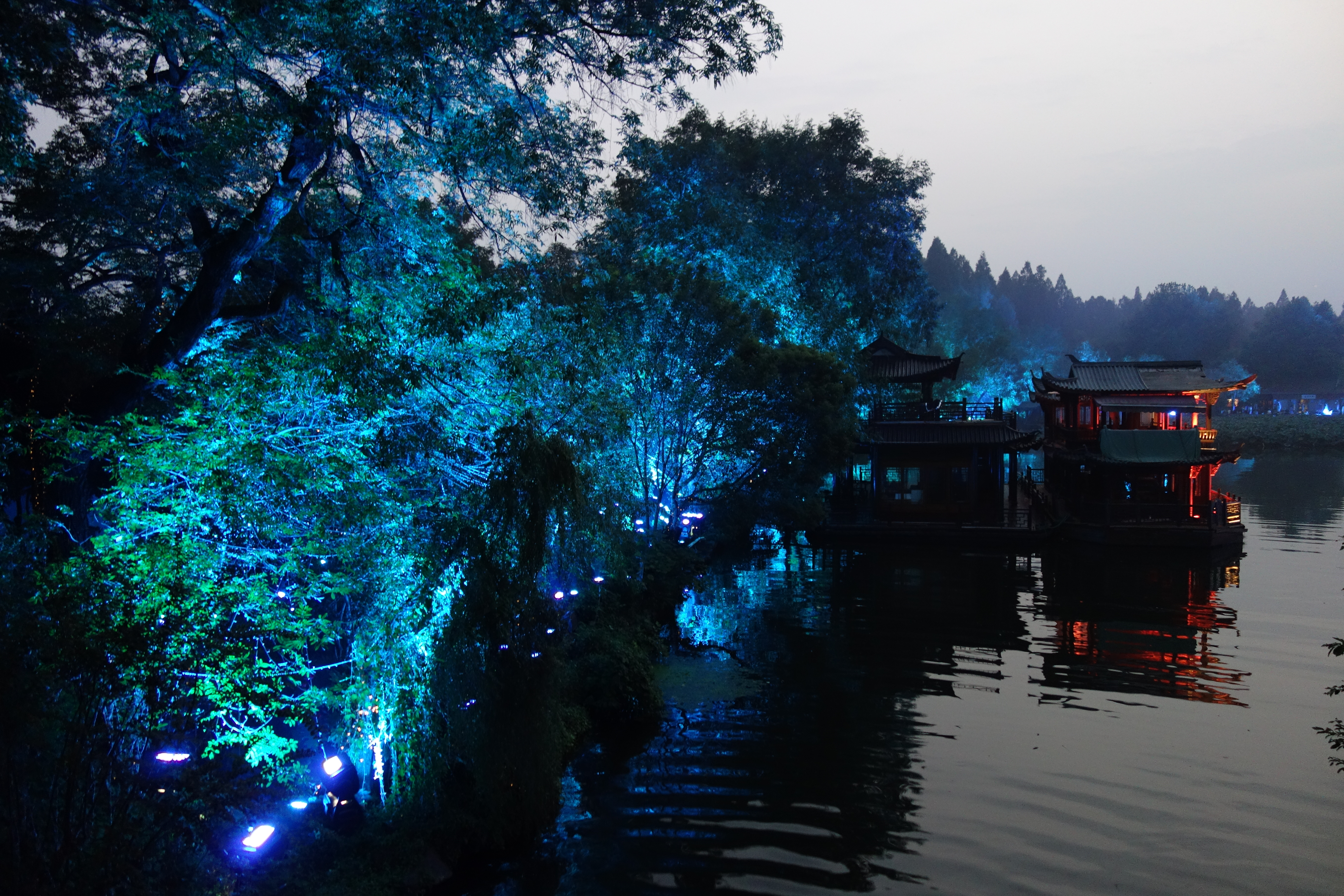
West Lake in Hangzhou, at night

The Five Lakes or Wu Hu (Chinese: 五湖; pinyin: wǔhú), is a Chinese historical and geographical concept that has been used to describe various lakes in China.

The Five Lakes most commonly refer to are five freshwater lakes in eastern and central China: Lake Tai in Jiangsu and Zhejiang, Hongze Lake in Jiangsu, Lake Chao in Anhui, Poyang Lake in Jiangxi, and Dongting Lake in Hunan.

In several ancient texts, including the Rites of Zhou and Records of the Grand Historian, the term was used to describe only Lake Tai. Various sources have described other lakes as the Five Lakes. One European 19th century encyclopedia identifies West Lake in Zhejiang as one of the Five Lakes in place of Lake Chao.

== Idiomatic expression ==
In modern parlance, the idiom the "five lakes and four seas" is used to describe a vast domain, such as the entire country or the entire world.

== See also ==
- List of lakes of China
