= Miao Xuegang =

Chinese politician

- 缪学刚

Director of the Anhui Provincial Environmental Protection Department
- In office June 2009 – November 2016
- Preceded by: New title
- Succeeded by: Wang Yingchun

Mayor of Chuzhou
- In office 2004–2009
- Preceded by: Song Weiping
- Succeeded by: Jiang Shan

Personal details
- Born: March 1962 (age 64) Gushi County, Henan, China
- Party: Chinese Communist Party
- Education: Central University of Finance and Economics

Chinese name
- Simplified Chinese: 缪学刚
- Traditional Chinese: 繆學剛
Transcriptions
Standard Mandarin
- Hanyu Pinyin: Miào Xuégāng

Miao Xuegang (Chinese: 缪学刚; born March 1962) is a former Chinese politician who spent most of his career in east China's Anhui province. As of May 2024 he was under investigation by China's top anti-graft watchdog. Previously he served as director of the Hong Kong, Macao, Taiwan, Overseas Chinese and Foreign Affairs Committee of the Anhui Provincial Committee of the Chinese People's Political Consultative Conference. He was a delegate to the 11th and 12th National People's Congress.

== Early life and education ==
Miao was born in Gushi County, Henan, in March 1962. He attended Gushi County High School. In 1979, he entered Central Institute of Finance and Banking (now Central University of Finance and Economics), where he majored in finance.

== Career ==
After university in 1983, Miao was assigned as an official to Anhui Provincial Finance Department, and over a period of eight years worked his way up to the position of deputy director of the Office. He joined the Chinese Communist Party (CCP) in March 1991.

In July 1994, he became director of the Office of Anhui Provincial Local Taxation Bureau and director of the Regulations Division, but held the position for only two years. He served as magistrate of Fanchang County from November 1996 to February 1998, and party secretary, the top political position in the county, from February 1998 to September 2002. He was made deputy director of Anhui Provincial Economic and Trade Commission in September 2002. In February 2004, he was named acting mayor of Chuzhou, confirmed in January 2005.

In June 2009, he was chosen as director of the newly founded Anhui Provincial Environmental Protection Department, and served until November 2016, when he was appointed deputy head of the United Front Work Department of the CCP Anhui Provincial Committee. In May 2002, he took office as deputy director of the Hong Kong, Macao, Taiwan, Overseas Chinese and Foreign Affairs Committee of the Anhui Provincial Committee of the Chinese People's Political Consultative Conference, rising to director the next year.

== Downfall ==
On 23 May 2024, Miao was put under investigation for alleged "serious violations of discipline and laws" by the Central Commission for Discipline Inspection (CCDI), the party's internal disciplinary body, and the National Supervisory Commission, the highest anti-corruption agency of China.

Government offices
Preceded by Song Weiping	Mayor of Chuzhou; 2004–2009	Succeeded by Jiang Shan
New title	Director of the Anhui Provincial Environmental Protection Department; 2009–2016	Succeeded by Wang Yingchun
