= Miao Xiyong =

Chinese Ming dynasty physician

Miao Xiyong (Chinese: 繆希雍; pinyin: Miào Xīyōng; 1546–1627), courtesy name Zhongchun (Chinese: 仲醇; pinyin: Zhòngchún), was a Chinese physician active during the Ming dynasty. Reportedly a self-taught physician, many of his prescriptions were collected in a compendium titled Notes from the Studio of Early Enlightenment. Miao also authored a commentary on the Shennong bencao jing.

== Career ==
Born to an affluent family in Changshu, Miao did not sit for any imperial examinations and purportedly began learning medicine on his own from the age of seventeen. Unlike his fellow physicians, who usually worked in a shop and dispensed their own prescriptions, Miao was a wandering physician who did not carry any medicine with him. He would not hesitate to travel to distant locations on horseback. Most of his clients tended to be in the upper-class and could readily access the expensive ingredients that Miao would prescribe by hand. One of Miao's patients had to endure a year-long regimen of abdominal pain medication, or a total of six hundred doses, before he was cured.

Miao was known for his preference for "cold and cooling drugs", such as the gypsum that he used to cure a pregnant woman of her fever. However, he also prescribed "warm-natured" drugs on occasion. For instance, he made a patient consume large amounts of ginseng to alleviate his belching.

Miao spent most of his final years in the county of Jintan, where he remained active as a literatus and physician. However, after many of his academic friends were persecuted or purged by court eunuch Wei Zhongxian, due to a dispute over governmental policy, Miao retreated to his hometown. His treatise on the Shennong bencao jing, titled Shénnóng Běncǎo Jīng Shū (神农本草经疏) or Exegesis of the Divine Farmer's Classic of Materia Medica, was published in 1625, with the assistance of a distant relative named Mao Fengbao (1599–1659). At some point, Miao returned to Jintan and died there in 1627.

== Writings ==
In 1611, Ding Yuanjian (1560–1625), a former official and Miao's friend of thirty years, began compiling a collection of "efficacious medical recipes" that Miao had prescribed. Among the prescriptions discussed in the Xianxingzhai biji (先醒斋笔记) or Notes from the Studio of Early Enlightenment is a decoction containing a virgin boy's urine mixed with various herbs that Miao had used to treat Ding himself in 1615, when he suffered a minor stroke.

A revised edition, titled Xianxingzhai guangbiji (先醒斋广笔记) or Expanded Notes from the Studio of Early Enlightenment, lists Miao as the primary author and contains his commentary alongside Ding's original notes. It was first published in 1622, in response to the overwhelming demand for the earlier Xianxingzhi biji that had ostensibly gone out of stock by 1621. A further revised edition of the text (and the only extant version today) was published by one of Miao's earliest students, Li Zhi, in 1642.

== Appearance ==
Miao was an "eccentric gentleman" who had "electrifying eyes and protruding whiskers". According to his contemporary Qian Qianyi:

He thinks deeply and observes attentively, as if deep in Chan meditation; now he closes his eyes and falls into hypnosis, and in the next moment he rises with full force, lifting his beard and rolling up sleeves, and proceeds to write a prescription and put together some medicines. He takes command and oversees things, and ideas just spring out from his fingers.
