= Jiang Shan =

Chinese politician

- 江山

Communist Party Secretary of Chuzhou
- In office December 2012 – April 2014
- Preceded by: Han Xiancong
- Succeeded by: Li Ming

Chairman of the Standing Committee of Chuzhou Municipal People's Congress
- In office July 2012 – January 2013

Mayor of Chuzhou
- In office January 2010 – February 2012
- Preceded by: Miao Xuegang
- Succeeded by: Zhang Xiang'an

Personal details
- Born: September 1962 (age 63) She County, Anhui, China
- Party: Chinese Communist Party (1987–2014; expelled)

Jiang Shan (Chinese: 江山; pinyin: Jiāng Shān; born September 1962) is a former Chinese politician who spent most of his career in east China's Anhui province. As of April 2014 he was under investigation by the Chinese Communist Party's internal control body, and he was expelled from the party and removed from office in December 2014. Previously he served as the Chinese Communist Party Committee Secretary of Chuzhou.

== Life and career ==
Jiang was born and raised in She County, Anhui. After college, he worked at Longfu Middle School. And later an official at the Propaganda Department of CCP Tunxi Municipal Committee.

Beginning in December 1987, he served in several posts in Huizhou District, including secretary, deputy director, and director.

He was promoted to Vice-Mayor of Huangshan in November 2000. In June 2003 he was promoted again to become the Chinese Communist Party Deputy Committee Secretary.

In September 2005, he was transferred to Hefei, capital of Anhui province, and served as the head and Party Branch Secretary of Travel Bureau of Anhui province.

He served as Mayor and Deputy Communist Party Secretary of Chuzhou from January 2010 to February 2012, and CCP Committee Secretary, the top political position in the city, from February 2012 to April 2014. At the same time as holding the post of Director of the Chuzhou Municipal People's Congress between July 2012 to January 2013.

In April 2014, he was being investigated by the Central Commission for Discipline Inspection for "serious violations of laws and regulations". On December 30, 2014, he was expelled from the party and removed from office.

In October 2017 he was sentenced to 11 years in prison on taking bribes. He was fined 1.4 million yuan and had his illegal gains confiscated.

Government offices
| Preceded by Miao Xuegang | Mayor of Chuzhou; 2010–2012 | Succeeded by Zhang Xiang'an |
Party political offices
| Preceded by Han Xiancong | Communist Party Secretary of Chuzhou; 2012–2014 | Succeeded by Li Ming |
