= Majiabang culture =

Chinese Neolithic culture

Coordinates: 30°44′09″N 120°42′54″E

- Alternative names: Ma-chia-pang culture
- Geographical range: Zhejiang, China
- Period: Neolithic China
- Dates: 5000–3350 BC
- Major sites: Weidun Site
- Followed by: Liangzhu culture

Chinese name
- Traditional Chinese: 馬家浜文化
- Simplified Chinese: 马家浜文化
Transcriptions
Standard Mandarin
- Hanyu Pinyin: Mǎjiābāng wénhuà
- Wade–Giles: Ma-chia-pang Wen-hua

The Majiabang culture, formerly also written Ma-chia-pang, was a Neolithic culture that occupied the Yangtze River Delta, primarily around Lake Tai west of modern Shanghai (Note: Although modern maps are often used to illustrate the range of the Majiabang culture, Pudong and downtown Shanghai were still part of the East China Sea during the culture's existence, with the coastline still located at Xinzhuang in Minhang District.) and north of Hangzhou Bay. The culture spread throughout southern Jiangsu and Zhejiang north of Hangzhou Bay from around 5000 BC to 3300 BC, coexisting with the Hemudu culture in Zhejiang south of the bay. The later part of the period is now considered a separate cultural phase, referred to as the Songze culture. The Majiabang and Songze cultures were succeeded in their area by the Liangzhu culture.

Based on their archaeological findings, archaeologists have theorised that the Majiabang culture is the origin of the early fishing, hunting and gathering economy in China, and that the rice-dominant system of agriculture was developed by people living in this period.

Majiabang people cultivated rice. At Caoxieshan and Chuodun, sites of the Majiabang culture, archaeologists excavated paddy fields, indicating the centrality of rice to the economy. In addition faunal remains excavated from Majiabang archaeological sites indicated that people had domesticated pigs. However, the remains of sika and roe deer have been found, showing that people were not totally reliant on agricultural production. Archaeological sites also bear evidence that Majiabang people produced jade ornaments.

In the lower stratum of the Songze excavation site in Shanghai's modern day Qingpu District, archaeologists found the prone skeleton of one of the area's earliest inhabitants—a 25–30-year-old male with an almost complete skull dated to the Majiabang era.

== Related cultures ==
Initially, archaeologists had considered the Majiabang sites and sites in northern Jiangsu to be part of the same culture, naming it the Qingliangang culture. Archaeologists later realized that the northern Jiangsu sites were of the Dawenkou culture and renamed the southern Jiangsu sites Majiabang culture. Some scholars state that the Hemudu culture co-existed with the Majiabang culture as two separate and distinct cultures, with cultural transmissions between the two. Other scholars group Hemudu in with Majiabang subtraditions.

== Environment ==
The climate in the period had more annual rainfall than at present, with higher average temperature. From 7000 to 6500 BP, the annual precipitation was 1500 to 2000 mm with the average temperature 15 to 18 °C. After that, the average temperature reduced about 6000 BP, and slightly increased again about 5500 BP. Since 5300 BP, the temperature has gradually become cooler, in parallel with the climate changes in Northern Europe and Northern Asia during the Recent Epoch.

== Related sites ==
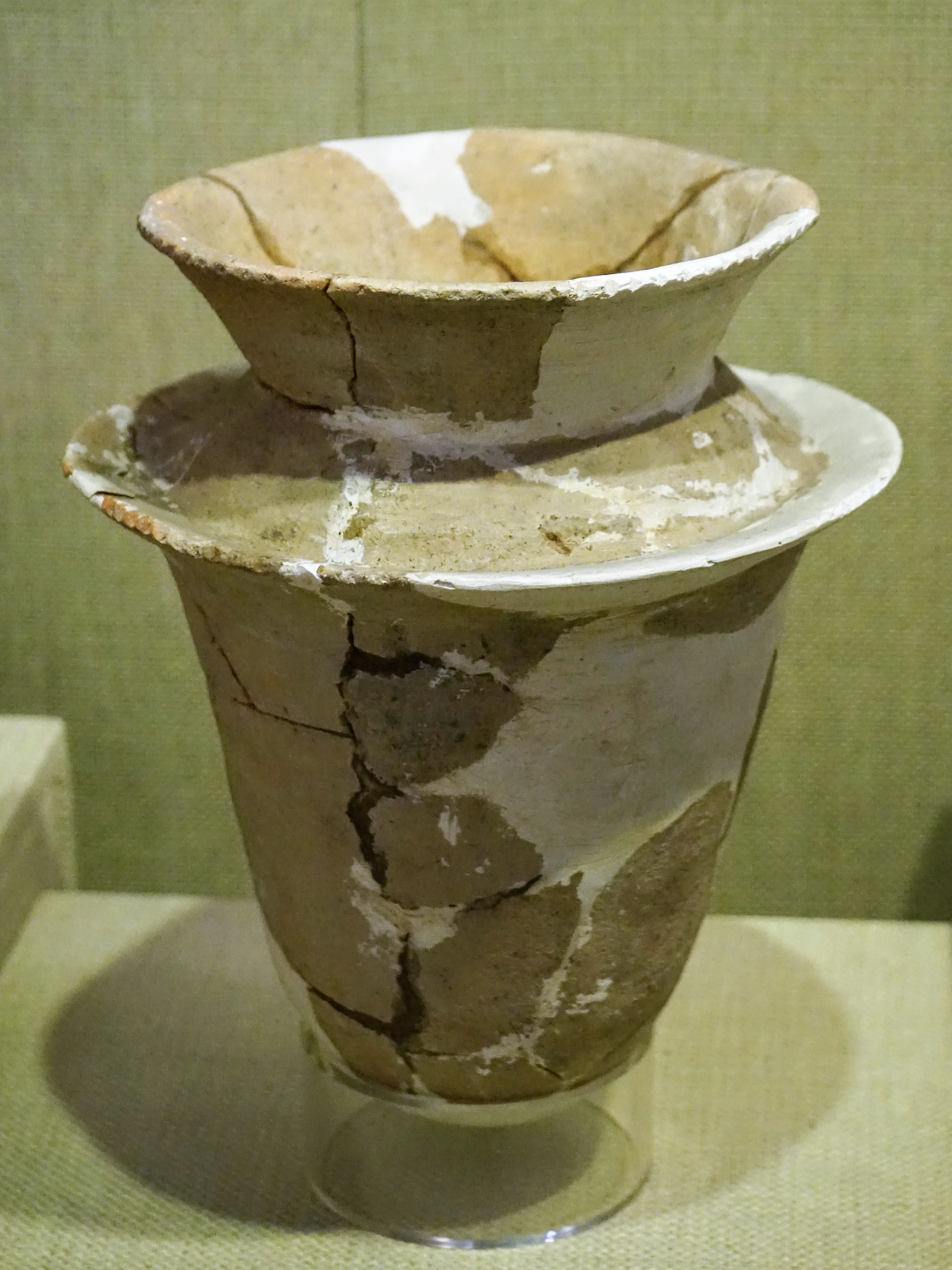
A Pottery Cooking Stove that has been found at Weidun site.

The Weidun Site, one of the most important archaeological discoveries of the Majiabang culture, was discovered at Weidun village, Changzhou, Jiangsu Province in September 1985. At this site, several artifacts and about 38 burials were uncovered by the archaeological team from the Changzhou Museum and the Department of Anthropology from Zhejiang University. In addition, the deposit of this site is nearly 2 meters and can be separated into six layers, the ploughed layer on top, yellow-brown soil, yellow-green soil, grey-brown soil, grey-black soil and yellow-brown sterile soil at the bottom. Among those burials, 33 of them were considered as belonging to the period of the Majiabang culture, and those were found below a layer of yellow-brown, grey-brown and grey-black soil. Only 7 burials contained grave objects; the tomb M127 which was discovered under the layer of yellow-brown soil was one of them. Inside this tomb, the archaeologists found no trace of a coffin or burial pit, instead, they only found a male skeleton lying on his back, lying at a 20-degree angle, and facing east, with a few grave objects that include stone adzes, spindle whorls and ceramic bo-bowls.

== Material culture ==
=== Artifacts ===
In the Majiabang culture, people were already starting to make artifacts with different materials, jade and pottery in particular. They made these objects for different purposes. These Neolithic artifacts usually represent the combinations of beliefs and economic needs, they could also be seen as reflections of the owners' social status and identity in the Neolithic period.

==== Jade ====
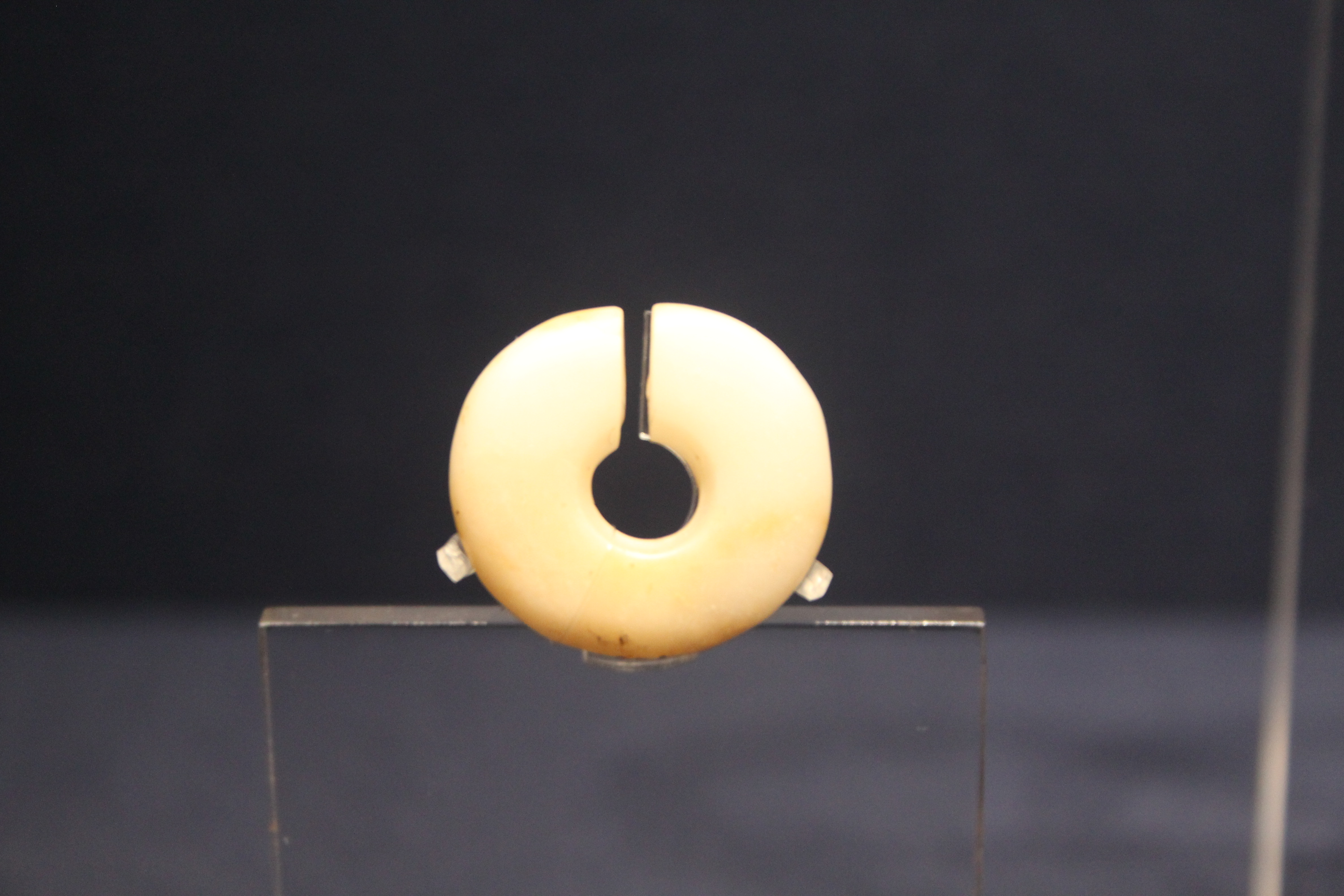
Majiabang Jade Jue

Majiabang people used jade when making ornaments. At Weisun Site, a few jade objects were found in the Majiabang Culture deposits, including hue-earrings, huang-pendants, small tube, and other ornaments. For example, a penannular jade ring and semi-annular jade discs, all made from local materials.

==== Pottery ====
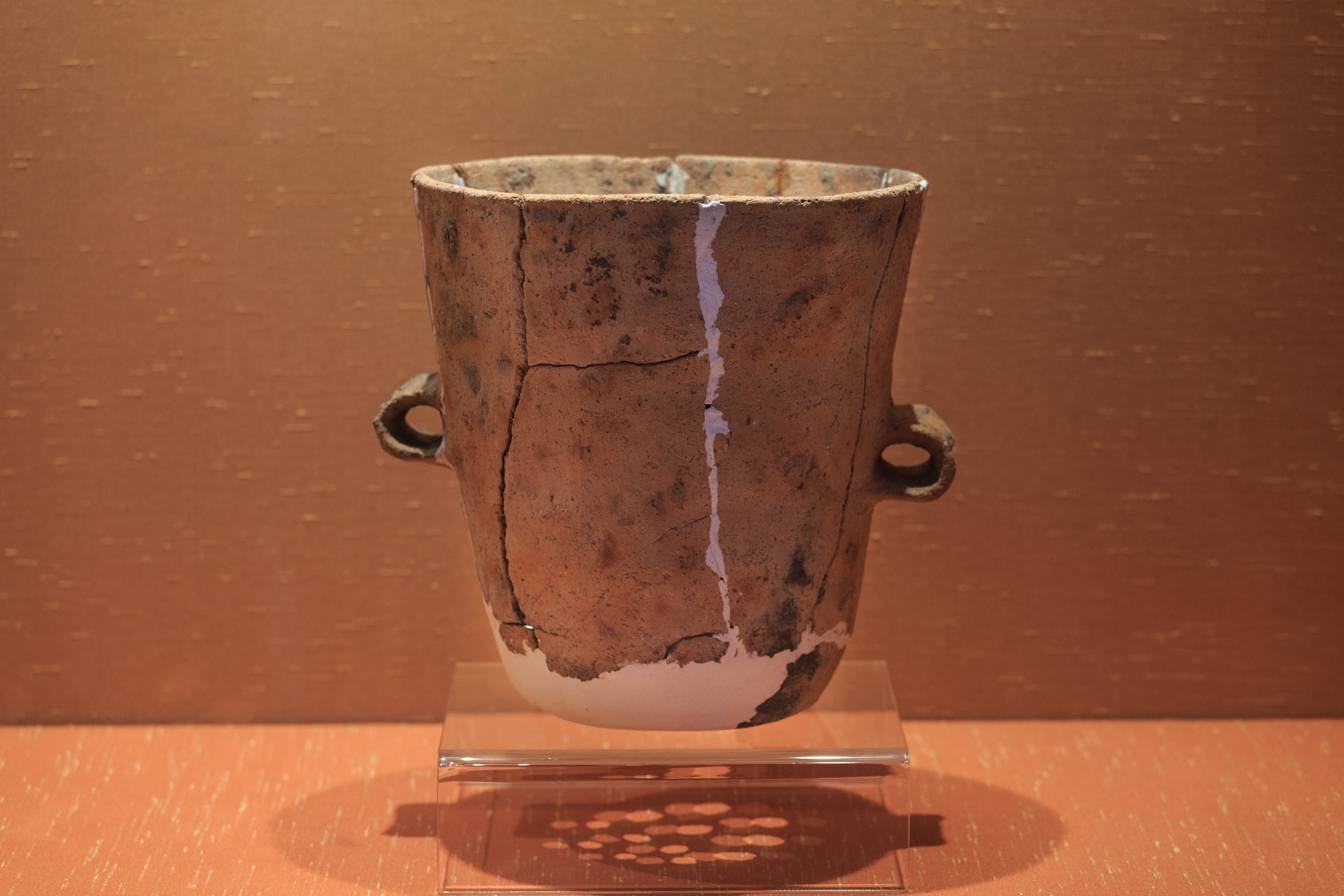
Majiabang red pottery.

In the Majiabang culture, all the pottery from the early period and most from the late period was handmade. Compared with the early period, the late period contained more types and styles of pottery. People made the pottery objects for with a particular function in mind. For example, pottery, pots, jars, bowls, etc. Those were important in their daily life, like cooking, drinking, and rituals. In the early period, people were using the mud from the bank, firewood that was heaped and the level earth to make the pottery, while in the late period, they started to put the red cover on the pottery. Besides that, those pottery objects also could be used as burial objects, this could be proved through the archaeological discoveries from those tombs.

At Weidun Site, archaeologists discovered a huge number of pottery objects, include fu-cauldrons, guan-pots, ding-tripod, dou-stemmed plates, bo-bowls, and pen-basins, most of them were fine-clay ware, and some were tempered with shell or sand.

===== Fu-cauldron =====
Fu-cauldron has three types, include type A, type B and type C. Type A has a wide rim, flared collar and contracted neck, in more detail, this can be divided into two subtypes, Aa without decoration around the rim and Ab with floral border around the rim, while type B has the feature of contracted collar, and curved body.

===== Guan-pot =====
While Guan-pot has five types, and most of them were fragments. Type A has the features of round shoulder and contracted neck, in great detail, it can be divided three sub-types, type Aa with flat and straight rim, type Ab with concave rim, type Ac with tine and slightly concave rim. Type B has the features of slim body, sloping shoulders and small flat bottom, it also can be divided into two subtypes, type Ba with tiny and bending rim, type Bb with round rim and flared collar. Type C has the features of narrow rim and short body. Type D has the features of the cattle-nose-like handles, it can be identified into two subtypes as well, type Da with handles on the rim, type Db with handles under the rim. Type E has the features of round ring foot and smaller size, it also can be divided into two subtypes, type Ea with a round belly, type Eb with an angular profile.

===== Ding =====
Ding has two types. Type A has the features of cauldron-like body, while type B has the features of pot-like body. In more detail, the legs of ding can be divided into three types, taper in shape, wide flat and long.

===== Dou-stemmed plate =====
Unlike others, dou-stemmed plate has two parts, stem part and plate part, each part has different features. For the stem part, it has two types, type A has the features of slim shape, while type B has a chunky shape. For the plate part, it can be identified into three types. Type A has the features of a shallow plate, it can be divided into 2 subtypes, type Aa with contracted collar, type Ab with a flared collar. Type B has the features of deep plate, it can be further divided into two subtypes as well, type Ba with contracted collar, type Bb with flared collar.

===== Bo-bowl =====
Bo-bowl can be divided into two types. Type A has the features of wide flared upper body, and type B has contracted upper body.

===== Pen-basin =====
Lastly, pen-basin has two types as well. Type A has the features of round belly, and type B has the features of angular profile.

=== Tools ===
Based on the archaeological discoveries, Majiabang people used different materials to make tools. Those materials include stone, wood, and bone, antler and teeth, and wood is the major one.

==== Stone ====
At Weidun site, archaeologists found a few stone-made objects that were mainly adzes and axes and most of them were polished. For the features of adzes, there are mainly two types. Type A has the features of wide flat shape, while type B has strip shape. Axes had two types as well. Type A has the shape of flat trapezium, while B has the shape of tongue.

==== Wood ====
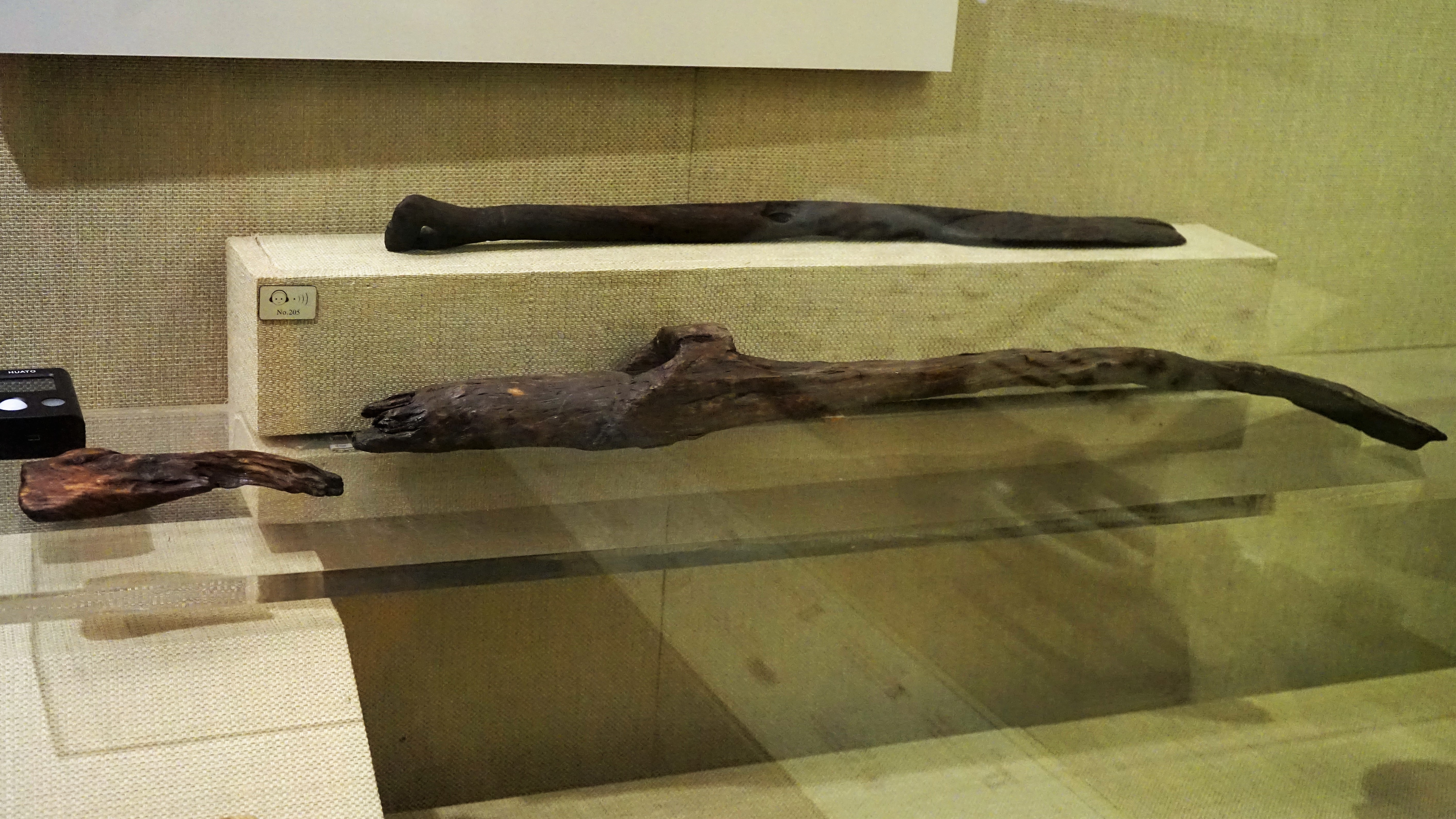
Majiabang Wooden Oar

Wood is another important material. At Weidun site, a few large wooden objects were discovered. There are mainly two types, scull and oar. The scull was made by the crassitude log, and its length is 120 cm, while oar has the features of flat and half-ellipse shape with a handle, and its length is shorter than scull, which is ranged from 70 to 90 cm.

==== Bone, antler and teeth ====
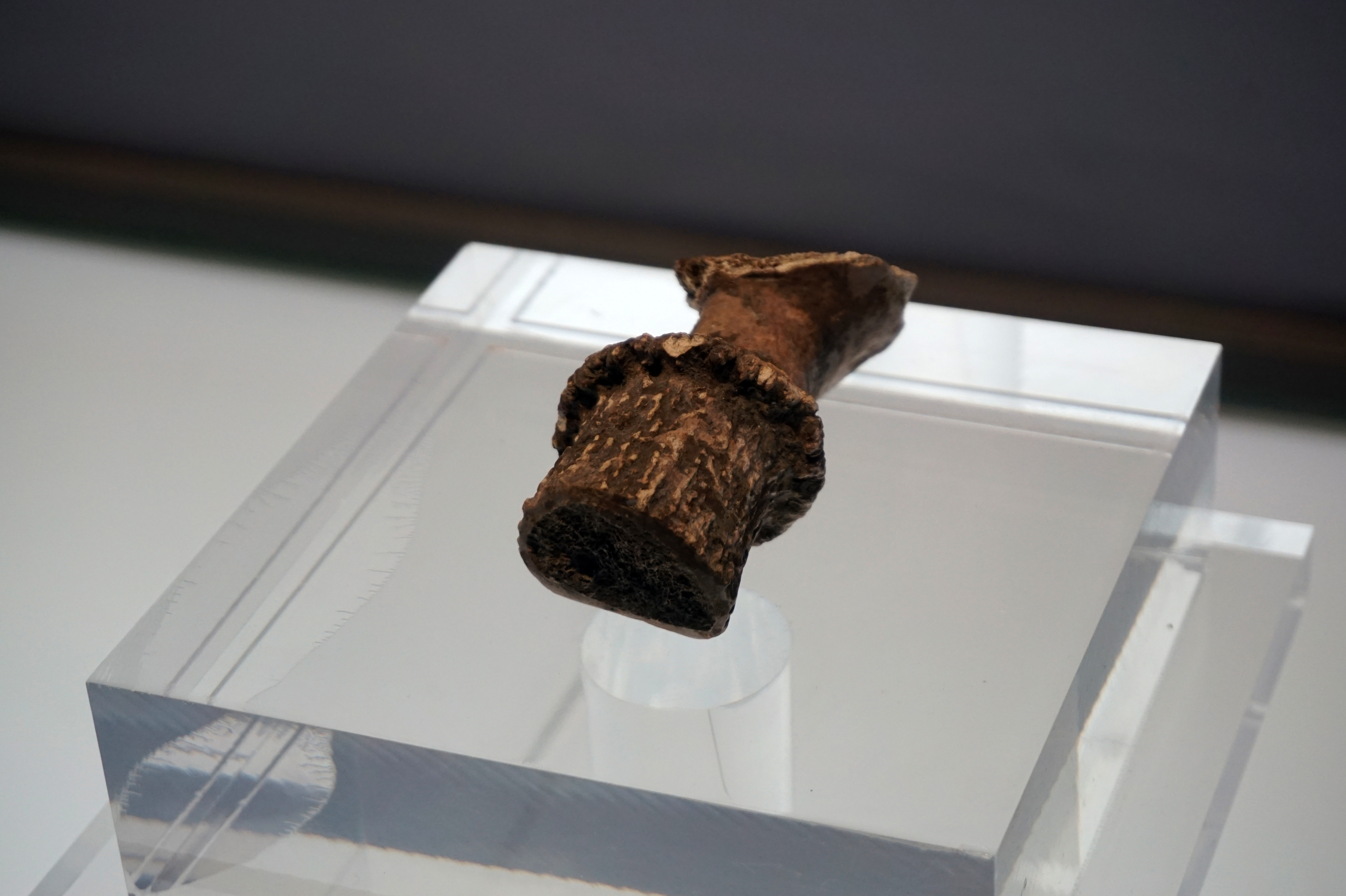
Majiabang antler

A few objects made from bone, antler and teeth also had been discovered at Weidun site that include bone-made degrees and knives, antler-made shoe-shape tool, arrowheads, awls, needles, spears and tube.

== Burial culture ==
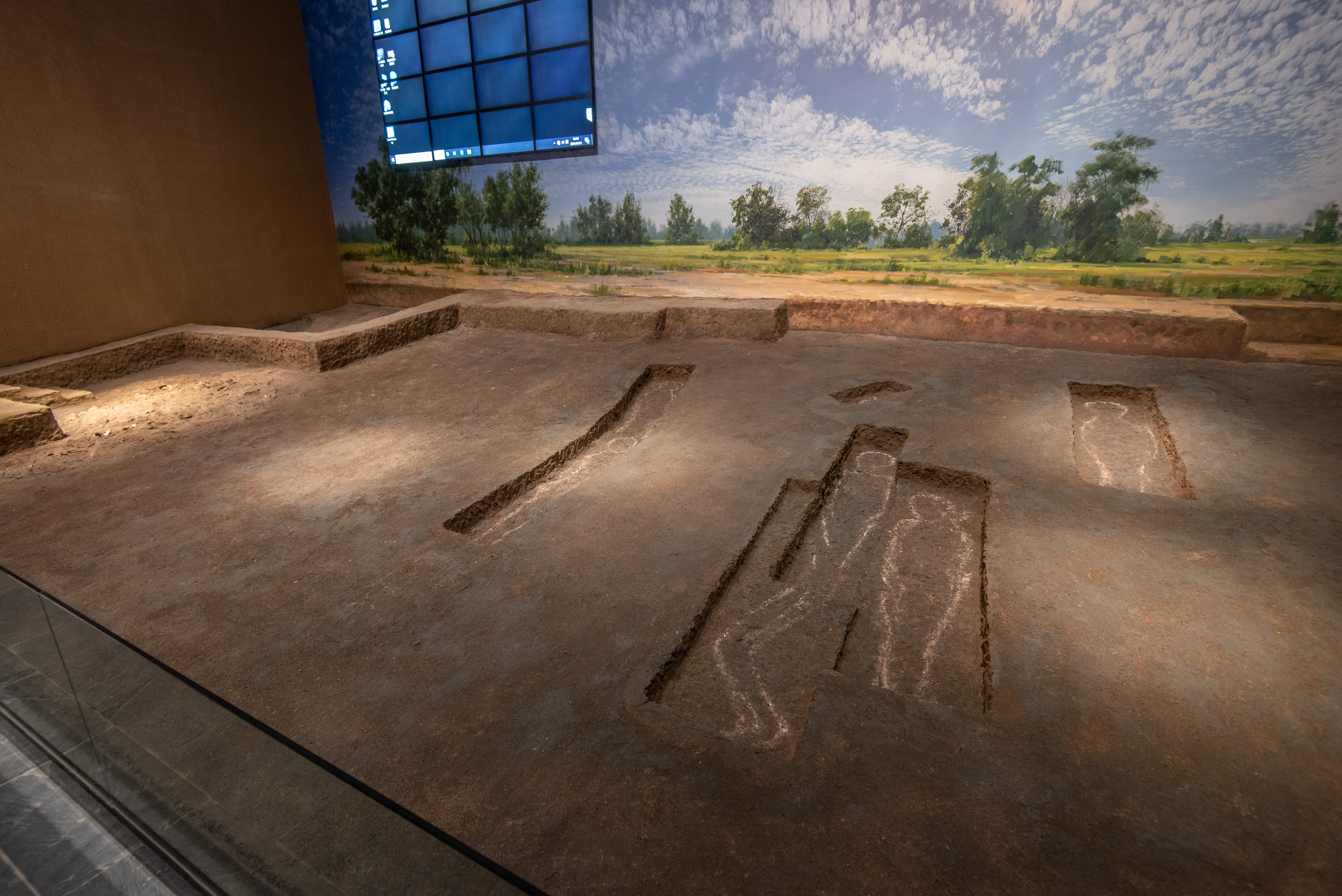
The burial sites on Majiabang Site.

The burial culture could be seen as an important part of this culture, it presents people's beliefs and the ability to produce artifacts in the age of the Neolithic. In the Majiabang period, people had the belief in the afterlife that people's souls should be able to return to where they used to live after death, this could explain those graves from this period usually were found near the settlement. Based on the findings of those graves, experts suggested that people living in the period of 6500 B.P. did not have a specific area to bury, they usually were buried near their settlements with the position of lying sideways with their limbs bent and their heads facing east, like the finding of a male skeleton that lying at a 20-degree angle and facing east on the grave M127 at Weidun site. Five hundred years later, their burial culture has been changed that they were buried in separate burial pits in a merged burial area with the position that they were facing down in an elongated position, with the head to the north and the feet to the south.

== Rice cultivation ==
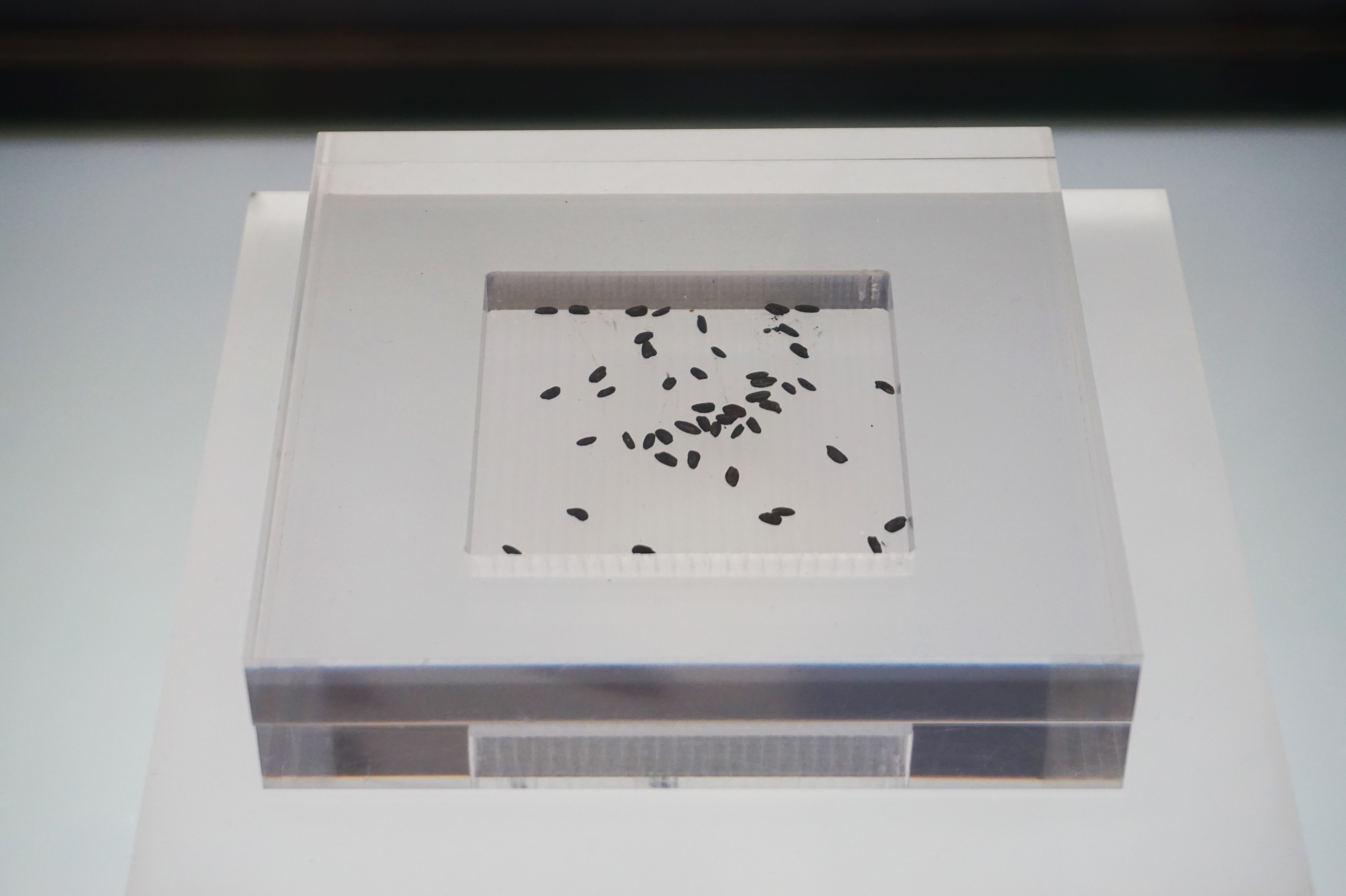
Carbonised rice grains belong to Majiabang.

The cultivation of rice could be seen as the most significant aspect of the Majiabang culture. As experts suggest that the farming of rice in the delta of the Yangzi River was beginning at the early period of Majiabang. It was expanded rapidly, although people were relying more on hunting, fishing and gathering. This has been proved through the analysis of the findings from the ancient paddy fields, Luojiajiao (existing in the period 5300 to 4900 cal. BC) was one of the earliest one. At this site, archaeologists unearthed hundreds of carbonised rice chaffs and rice grains, based on the study, half were considered as the cultivated japonica species, while another half belonged to the wild species. At other sites that belonged to the later period (during the period 5000 to 4300 BC and 4300 to 3500 BC), more rice remains had been discovered. Compared with the earlier periods, the proportion of rice farming was increased, while gathering wild plant foods was decreased.
