= Guowang Miao =

- Education: Tsinghua University, Georgia Institute of Technology
- Occupations: Professor, author
- Known for: Patents, books, LTE-A standardization
- Notable work: Energy and Spectrum Efficient Wireless Network Design

Guowang Miao is a system engineer and researcher focusing on next-generation mobile Internet and wireless systems. He researches primarily the design, signal processing, and optimization of cloud platforms and networking systems. He is the author of Fundamentals of Mobile Data Networks and Energy and Spectrum Efficient Wireless Network Design.

== Education ==
Guowang Miao received his bachelor's degree from Tsinghua University and his master's degree and Ph.D. from Georgia Institute of Technology, Atlanta.

== Career ==
Guowang Miao worked with Intel Labs as a Research Engineer, Samsung Research America as a Senior Standard Engineer and a 3GPP LTE-A RAN1/4 Delegate, and KTH first as an Assistant Professor and then as a tenured Associate Professor and Docent.

He won an Individual Gold Award from Samsung Telecom America, in 2011, for his work on LTE-A standardization.

During his services for various organizations, he has published more than 100 research papers, some of which are Essential Science Indicators (ESI) highly cited. He has more than a dozen patents granted and many more filed. Several of his patented technologies were adopted as essential in 4G and 5G standards and are being used globally. He has delivered many tutorials on energy-efficient design related topics at many international conferences. He also served as a technical program committee member for international conferences and also serves on the editorial board of some international journals.

== Publications ==
=== Books ===
- Energy and Spectrum Efficient Wireless Network Design.
- Graduate textbook: Fundamentals of Mobile Data Networks.

=== Patents ===
- Probabilistic interference mitigation for wireless cellular networks - US 8798653 B2.
- Apparatus and method for channel measurement in radio link monitoring in a wireless network - US 8755753 B2.
- Methods and apparatus for enabling interference coordination in heterogeneous networks - US 8600393 B2.
- Energy efficient link adaptation and resource allocation for wireless OFDMA systems - US 7782829 B2.
- Apparatus and method for supporting range expansion in a wireless network, EP 2601806 A2.
- Apparatus and method for primary uplink shared channel hopping in a wireless network, EP2638675A2.
