= Feixi County =

Coordinates: 31°43′33″N 116°58′36″E

Feixi 肥西县
- County
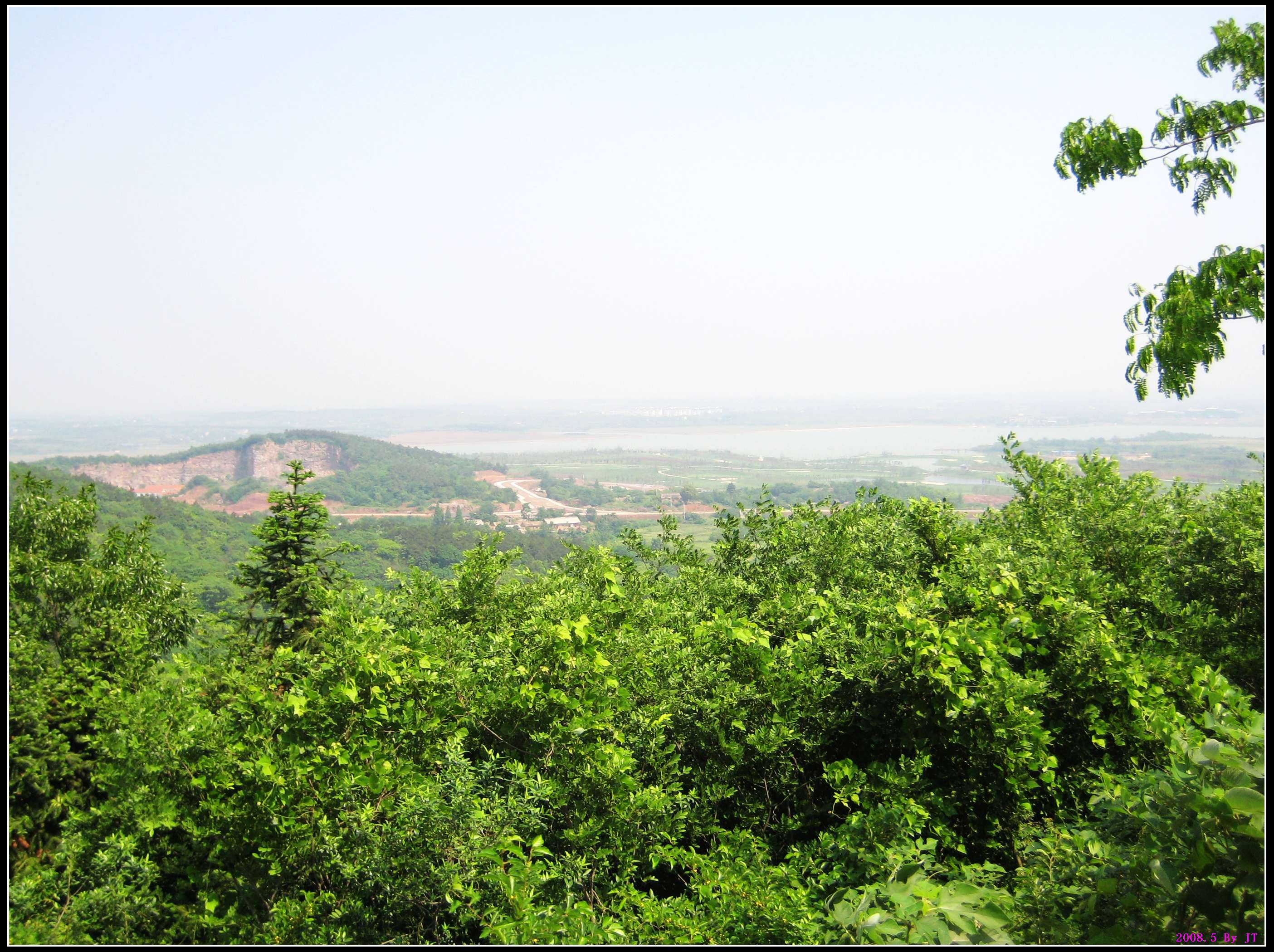

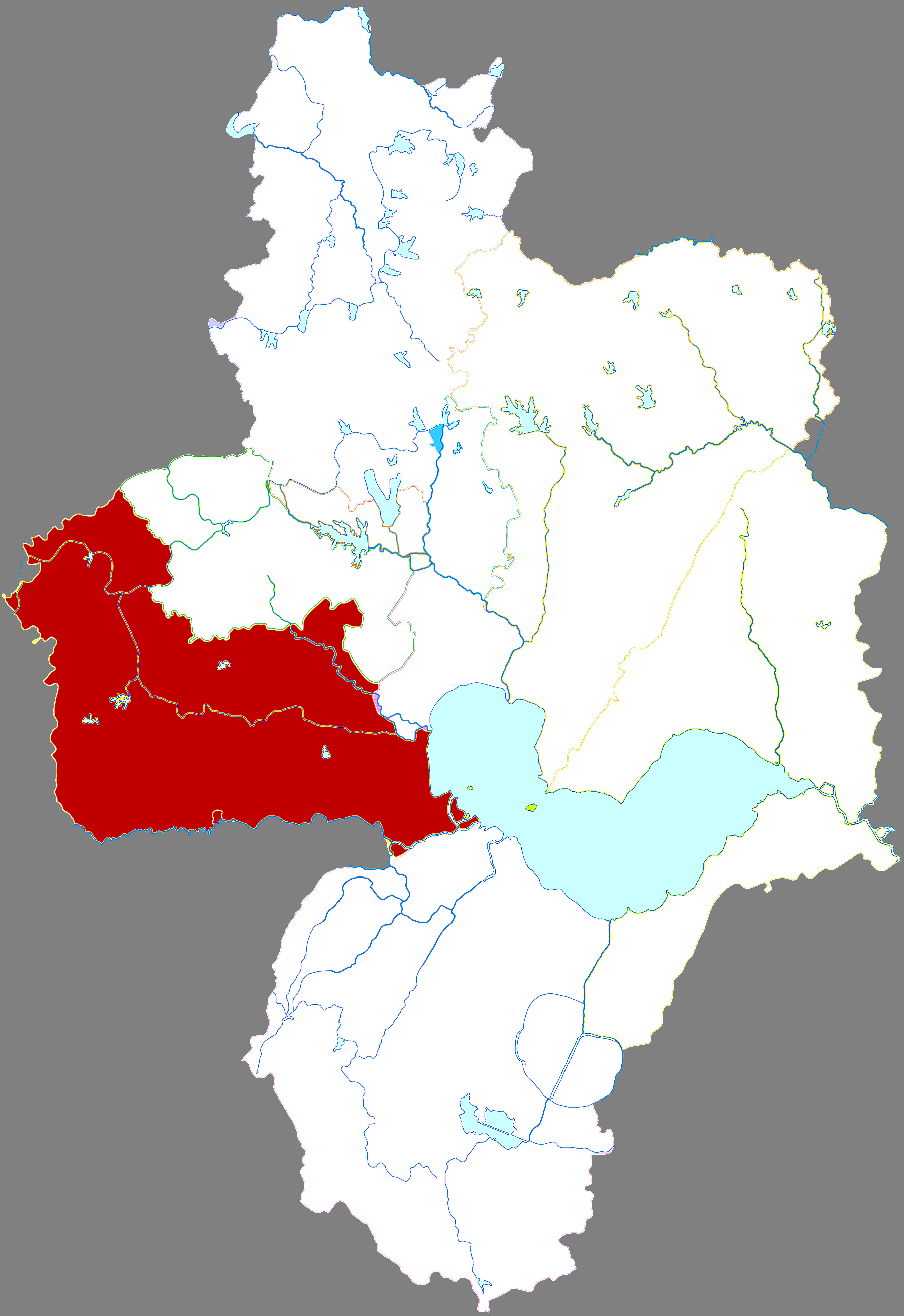
- Feixi in Hefei

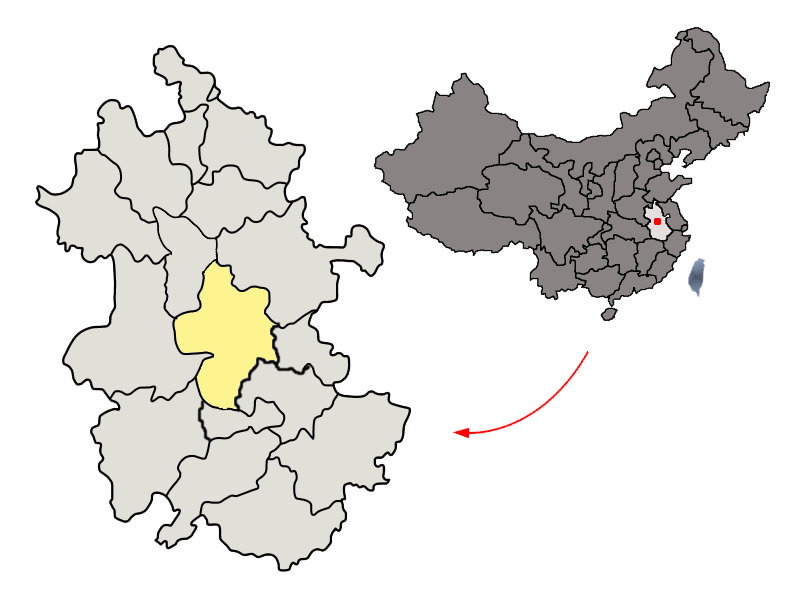
- Hefei in Anhui
- Country: China
- Province: Anhui
- Prefecture-level city: Hefei
- County seat: Shangpai

Government

Area
  - Total: 2,053.19 km^{2} (792.74 sq mi)

Population (2020)
  - Total: 967,508
  - Density: 471.222/km^{2} (1,220.46/sq mi)
- Time zone: UTC+8 (China Standard)
- Postal code: 231200
- Website: www.ahfeixi.gov.cn

Feixi County (simplified Chinese: 肥西县; traditional Chinese: 肥西縣; pinyin: Féixī Xiàn) is a county of Anhui Province, East China, under the administration of the prefecture-level city of Hefei, the capital of Anhui. The county has an area of 2,053.19 km^{2} (792.74 sq mi) and a population of 858,895 inhabitants.

== Administrative divisions ==
Feixi County is divided to 8 towns and 2 townships.

Towns

Shangpai (上派镇), Sanhe (三河镇), Guanting (官亭镇), Shannan (山南镇), Huagang (花岗镇), Zipeng (紫蓬镇), Taohua (桃花镇), Fengle (丰乐镇), Gaodian (高店镇)

Townships

Mingchuan Township (铭传乡), Shishugang Township (柿树岗乡), Yandian Township (严店乡)

Other Areas

Taohua Industrial Park Management Committee (桃花工业园管委会), Zipengshan Management Committee (紫蓬山管委会)

== Climate ==
Climate data for Feixi, elevation 28 m (92 ft), (1991–2020 normals, extremes 1959–present)
Month	Jan	Feb	Mar	Apr	May	Jun	Jul	Aug	Sep	Oct	Nov	Dec	Year
Record high °C (°F)	22.7 (72.9)	28.6 (83.5)	33.6 (92.5)	34.7 (94.5)	38.2 (100.8)	37.8 (100.0)	40.8 (105.4)	40.6 (105.1)	38.9 (102.0)	39.5 (103.1)	30.6 (87.1)	24.1 (75.4)	40.8 (105.4)
Mean daily maximum °C (°F)	7.2 (45.0)	10.2 (50.4)	15.4 (59.7)	21.8 (71.2)	27.0 (80.6)	29.4 (84.9)	32.5 (90.5)	31.9 (89.4)	28.0 (82.4)	22.7 (72.9)	16.3 (61.3)	9.8 (49.6)	21.0 (69.8)
Daily mean °C (°F)	2.7 (36.9)	5.4 (41.7)	10.3 (50.5)	16.5 (61.7)	21.9 (71.4)	25.3 (77.5)	28.3 (82.9)	27.6 (81.7)	23.2 (73.8)	17.2 (63.0)	10.7 (51.3)	4.6 (40.3)	16.1 (61.1)
Mean daily minimum °C (°F)	−0.7 (30.7)	1.6 (34.9)	6.0 (42.8)	11.7 (53.1)	17.2 (63.0)	21.6 (70.9)	25.0 (77.0)	24.2 (75.6)	19.4 (66.9)	12.8 (55.0)	6.2 (43.2)	0.7 (33.3)	12.1 (53.9)
Record low °C (°F)	−16.0 (3.2)	−16.3 (2.7)	−4.2 (24.4)	0.1 (32.2)	6.4 (43.5)	12.5 (54.5)	18.1 (64.6)	16.0 (60.8)	9.5 (49.1)	−0.1 (31.8)	−8.0 (17.6)	−16.1 (3.0)	−16.3 (2.7)
Average precipitation mm (inches)	47.8 (1.88)	53.4 (2.10)	76.6 (3.02)	84.5 (3.33)	95.2 (3.75)	160.0 (6.30)	166.0 (6.54)	129.2 (5.09)	71.6 (2.82)	52.2 (2.06)	54.7 (2.15)	34.2 (1.35)	1,025.4 (40.39)
Average precipitation days (≥ 0.1 mm)	9.3	9.1	10.9	10.0	10.7	10.6	11.7	11.9	8.3	8.1	8.4	7.0	116
Average snowy days	4.5	2.4	1.0	0	0	0	0	0	0	0	0.5	1.6	10
Average relative humidity (%)	78	78	72	72	73	78	81	82	81	79	79	77	78
Mean monthly sunshine hours	96.8	104.6	150.9	175.7	175.8	150.6	181.2	174.2	139.2	143.7	131.2	119.1	1,743
Percentage possible sunshine	30	33	41	45	41	36	42	43	38	41	42	38	39
Source: China Meteorological Administration all-time January high

== Notable people ==
- Han Xiancong (born 1955), politician
- Li Xiaowei (born 1964), computer scientist
- Liu Mingchuan (1836–1896), Qing general and politician
- Wang Dengping (born 1952), vice-admiral
- Zhu Congjiu (born 1965), financial executive and politician
