= Hemudu culture =

Neolithic culture just south of Hangzhou Bay, China

- Geographical range: Eastern China; 29.9642°N 121.3444°E
- Period: Neolithic China
- Dates: c. 5500 – c. 3300 BC

Chinese name
- Chinese: 河姆渡文化
Transcriptions
Standard Mandarin
- Hanyu Pinyin: Hémǔdù wénhuà

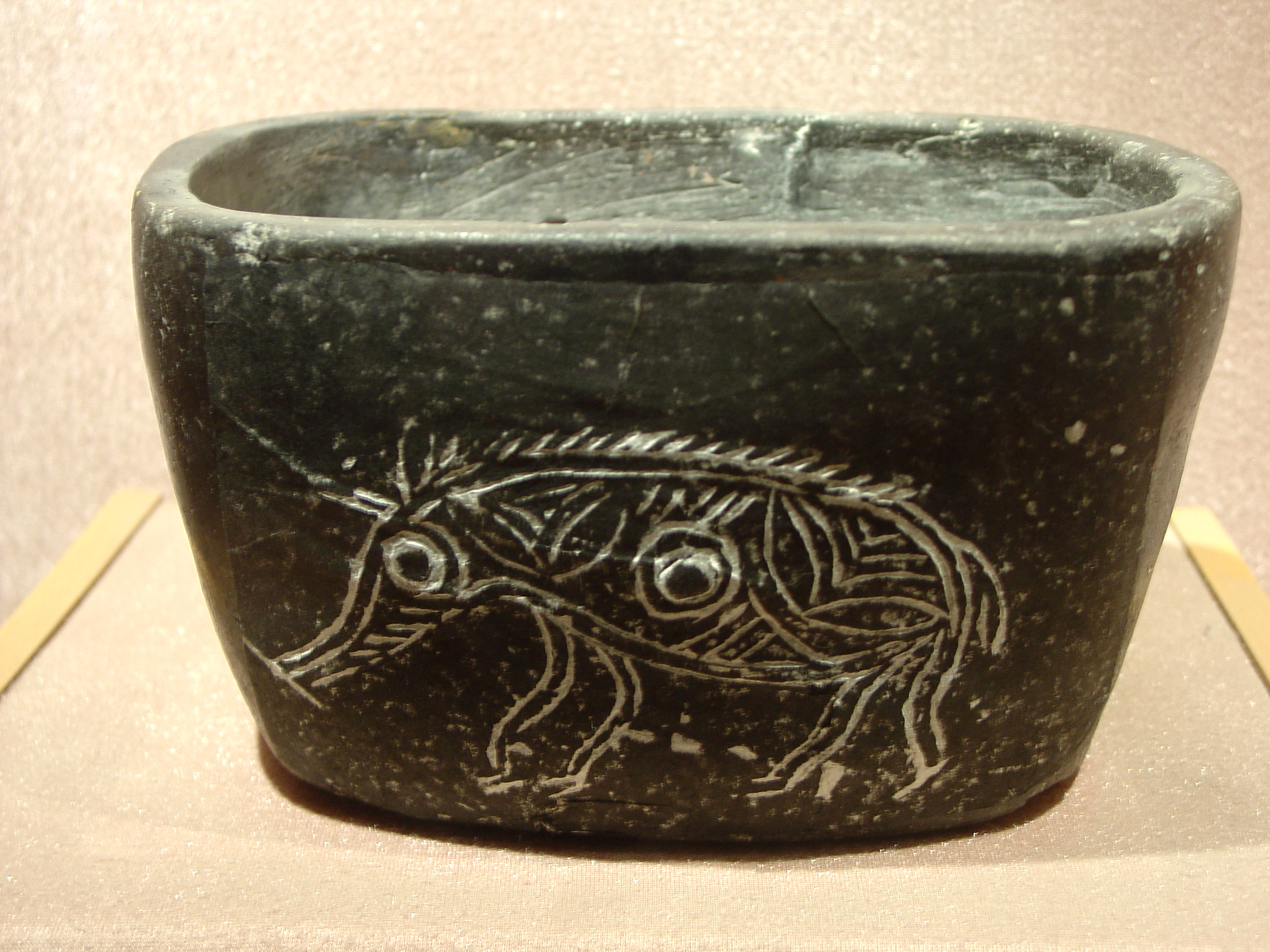
Pottery bowl with pig image, Hemudu culture

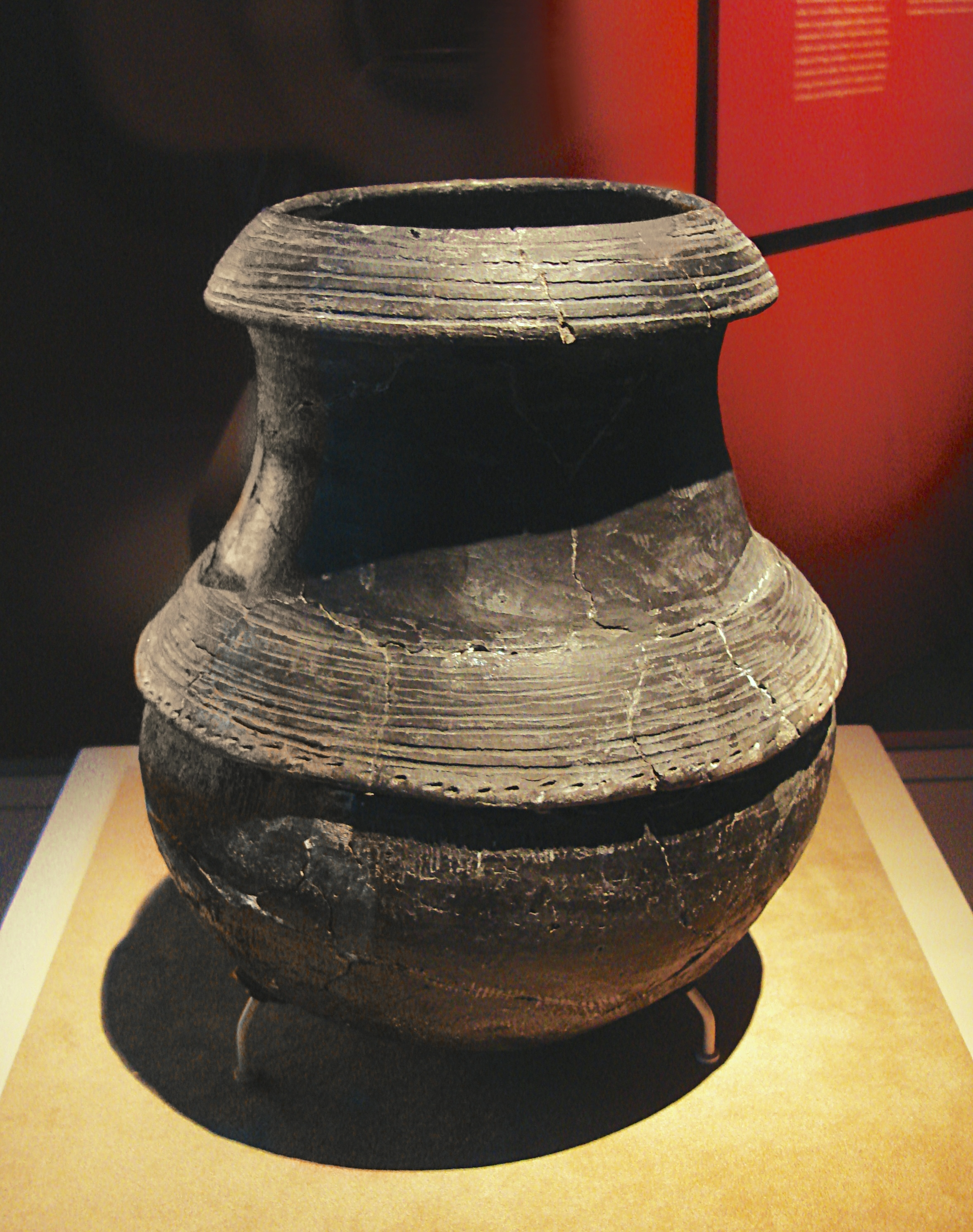
Black pottery of the Hemudu culture

The Hemudu culture (5500 BC to 3300 BC) was a Neolithic culture that flourished on the Chinese coast, just south of the Hangzhou Bay in Jiangnan in modern Yuyao, Zhejiang, China. The culture may be divided into early and late phases, before and after 4000 BC respectively. The site at Hemudu, 22 km northwest of Ningbo, was discovered in 1973. Hemudu sites were also discovered at Tianluoshan in Yuyao city, and on the islands of Zhoushan. Hemudu are said to have differed physically from inhabitants of the Yellow River sites to the north. Some authors propose that the Hemudu Culture was a source of the pre-Austronesian cultures.

== Material culture ==
Some scholars assert that the Hemudu culture co-existed with the Majiabang culture as two separate and distinct cultures, with cultural transmissions between the two. Other scholars group Hemudu in with Majiabang subtraditions. Two major floods caused the nearby Yaojiang River to change its course and inundated the soil with salt, forcing the people of Hemudu to abandon its settlements. The Hemudu people lived in long, stilt houses. Communal longhouses were also common in Hemudu sites, much like the ones found in modern-day Borneo.

The Hemudu culture was one of the earliest cultures to cultivate rice. Recent excavations at the Hemudu period site of Tianluoshan has demonstrated rice was undergoing evolutionary changes recognized as domestication. Most of the artifacts discovered at Hemudu consist of animal bones, exemplified by hoes made of shoulder bones used for cultivating rice. It was also the culture to invent the paddle for rowing and sports.

The culture also produced lacquer wood. A red lacquer wood bowl at the Zhejiang Museum is dated to 4000-5000 BC. It is believed to be the earliest such object in the world.

The remains of various plants, including water caltrop, Nelumbo nucifera, acorns, melon, wild kiwifruit, blackberries, peach, the foxnut or Gorgon euryale and bottle gourd, were found at Hemudu and Tianluoshan. The Hemudu people likely domesticated pigs but practiced extensive hunting of deer and some wild water buffalo. Fishing was also carried out on a large scale, with a particular focus on crucian carp. The practices of fishing and hunting are evidenced by the remains of bone harpoons and bows and arrowheads. Music instruments, such as bone whistles and wooden drums, were also found at Hemudu. Artifact design by Hemudu inhabitants bears many resemblances to those of Insular Southeast Asia.

The culture produced a thick, porous pottery. This distinctive pottery was typically black and made with charcoal powder. Plant and geometric designs were commonly painted onto the pottery; the pottery was sometimes also cord-marked. The culture also produced carved jade ornaments, carved ivory artifacts and small clay figurines.

== Sociopolitical organization ==
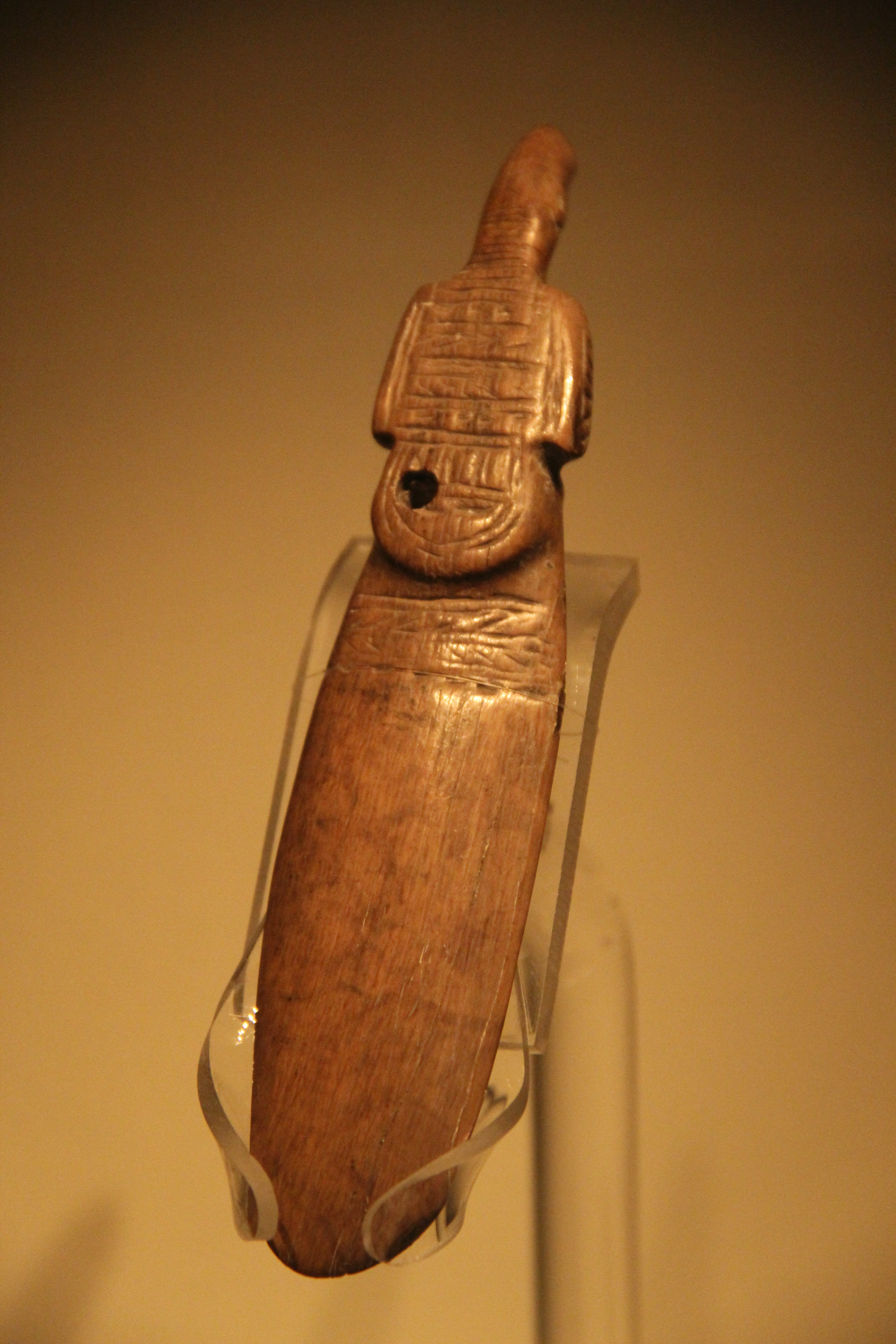
Neolithic ivory phoenix. Hemudu culture

The early Hemudu period is considered the maternal clan phase. Descent is thought to have been matrilineal and the social status of children and women comparatively high. In the later periods, they gradually shifted into patrilineal clans. During that period, the social status of men rose and descent was passed through the male line.

== Religion ==
Hemudu's inhabitants worshiped a sun spirit as well as a fertility spirit. They also enacted shamanistic rituals to the Sun and believed in bird totems. A belief in an afterlife and ghosts is thought to have been widespread as well. People were buried with their heads facing east or northeast and most had no burial objects. Infants were buried in urn-casket style burials, while children and adults received earth level burials. They did not have a definite communal burial ground, for the most part, but a clan communal burial ground has been found from the later period. Two groups in separate parts of this burial ground are thought to be two intermarrying clans. There were noticeably more burial goods in this communal burial ground.

== Environment ==
Hemudu culture and contemporary cultures and polities c. 5000 BC

Fossilized amoeboids and pollen suggests Hemudu culture emerged and developed in the middle of the Holocene Climatic Optimum. A study of a sea-level highstand in the Ningshao Plain from 7000 to 5000 BP shows that there may have been stabilized lower sea levels at this time, followed by frequent flooding from 5000 to 3900 BP. The climate was said to be tropical to subtropical with high temperatures and much precipitation throughout the year.

== See also ==
- List of Neolithic cultures of China
- Liangzhu culture
- Majiabang culture
- Yangshao culture

== Sources ==
- Fuller, D.Q.; Qin, Ling (2010), "Declining oaks, increasing artistry, and cultivating rice: the environmental and social context of the emergence of farming in the Lower Yangtze Region", Environmental Archaeology, 15 (2): 139–159, doi:10.1179/146141010X12640787648531, S2CID 140149877.
- Liu, Li; Chen, Xingcan (2012), The Archaeology of China: From the Late Paleolithic to the Early Bronze Age, Cambridge University Press, ISBN 978-0-521-64310-8.
- Wang, Haiming (2001), "Majiabang", in Peregrine, Peter N.; Ember, Martin (eds.), Encyclopedia of Prehistory, Volume 3: East Asia and Oceania, Springer, pp. 206–221, ISBN 978-0-306-46257-3.
