= Chao Lake =

Lake in Anhui, China

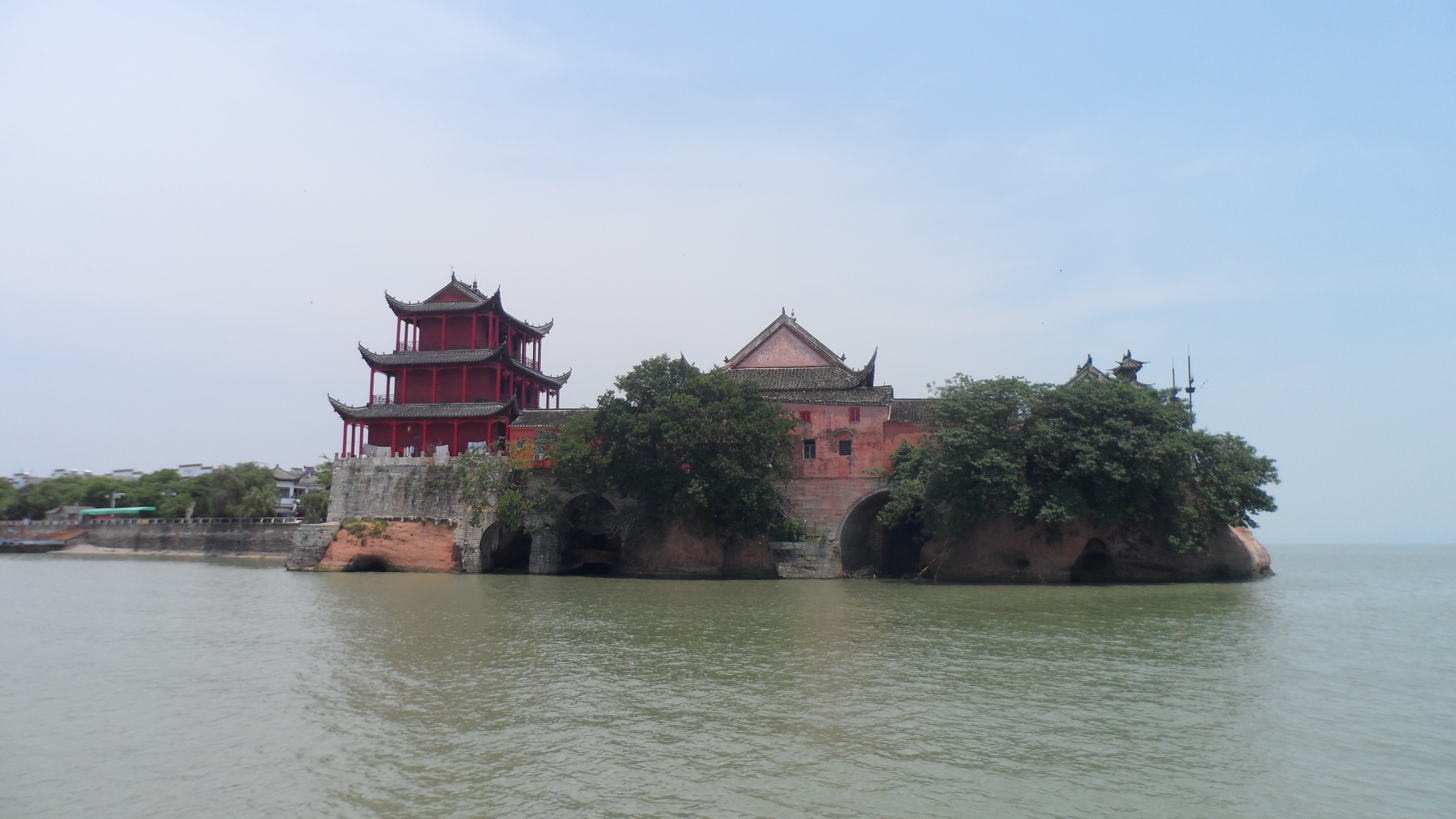
- Zhongmiao Temple on the north shore of Chao Lake

- Location within China
- Location: Hefei, Anhui
- Coordinates: 31.5°N 117.5°E
- Basin countries: China
- Max. length: 52 km (32 mi)
- Max. width: 22 km (14 mi)
- Surface area: 760 km^{2} (290 sq mi)
- Average depth: 2.5 m (8.2 ft)
- Max. depth: 5.0 m (16.4 ft)

Chao Lake
- Chinese: 巢湖
- Literal meaning: Birds' Nest Lake
Transcriptions
Standard Mandarin
- Hanyu Pinyin: Cháo Hú
- Wade–Giles: Ch'ao Hu

Chao Lake (Chinese: 巢湖), also known by its Chinese name Chao Hu, (Note: Before the 20th century, its romanizations also included Tsaou Lake and Tsiao Lake or Tsiao-hou.) is a lake wholly situated in Hefei, the capital of Anhui Province. It is the largest lake in Anhui and one of the five major freshwater lakes in China.

== Mythology ==
According to legend, the site of the lake was once a prosperous city named Chaozhou. Because of sins of its people, it was cursed by the heavens and ordered to be destroyed by flooding. The task was to be carried out by a white dragon, who was only able to find one good person, an old lady ("Lao" in Chinese) surnamed Jiao. After the destruction of Chaozhou, only the old lady and her daughter were saved. They became the two islands emerging from the lake.

This legend may be rooted in geological history, since Lake Chao is on the intersection of several major faults, of which the most famous is the Tan-Lu fault, which caused the great 1976 Tangshan earthquake in its northern section.

== Tourism ==
Tourist sites around the lake include Mushan Island, Zhongmiao Temple, Tongyang River, Mount Yinping, and the Immortals Cave. The silver fish, shrimps, and crabs of Lake Chao are called the Three Treasures; as such, the lake is nicknamed "The Land of Fish and Rice".

== Pollution and rehabilitation ==
About 5 million people live near the lake and use it for irrigation, transportation, and fishing. Heavy use since the 1990s led to eutrophication and silting. Due to China's rapid economic growth, the lake became one of China's most polluted.

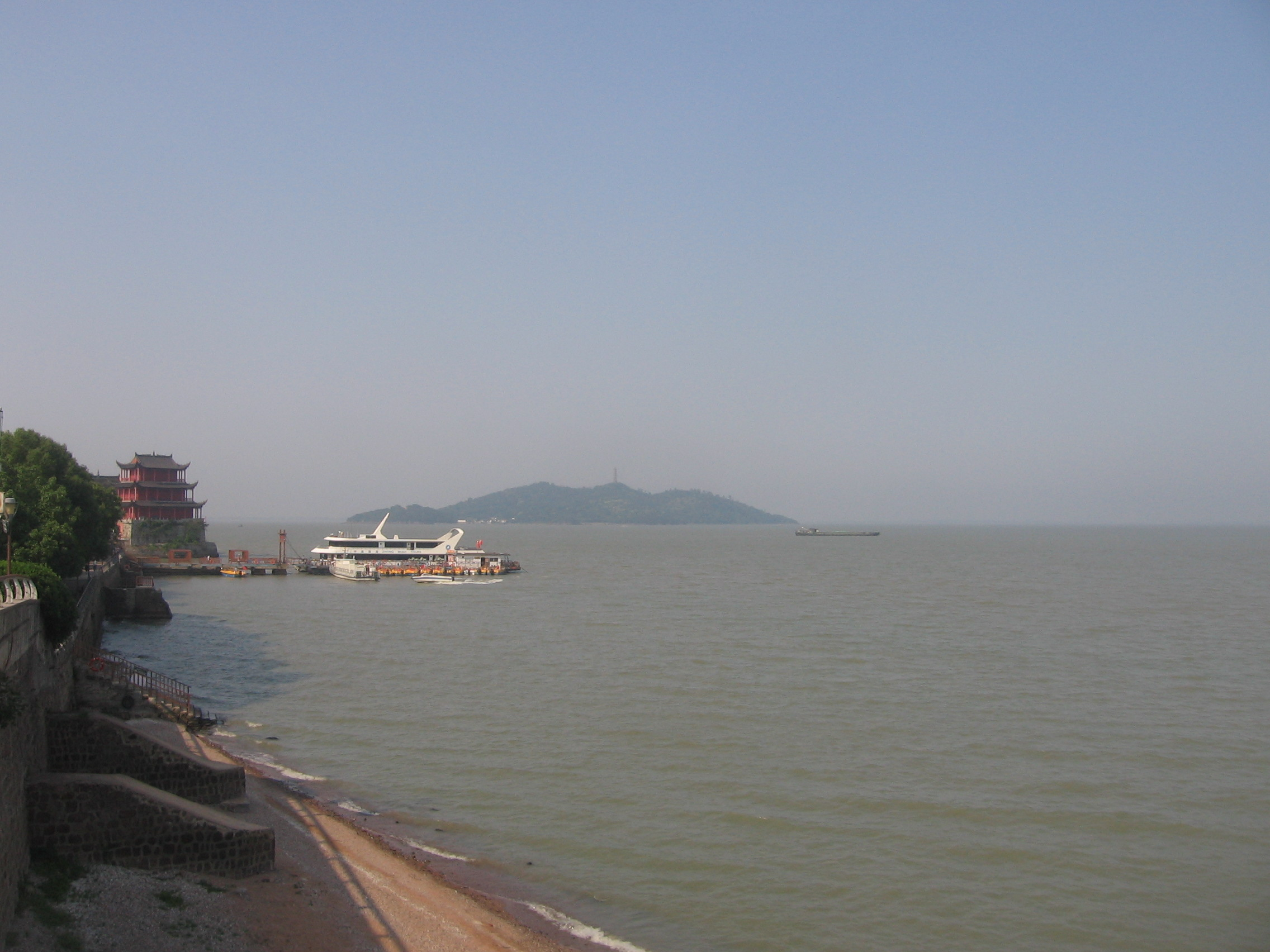
View of Mushan Island from the north shore

For government authorities, cleanup of the lake has been a top priority. The Chinese government borrowed from the Asian Development Bank a $250 million loan in 2011 to fund "investments in traditional environmental infrastructure, such as sewerage networks, wastewater treatment plants, and solid waste management" along with policy changes like discouraging use of chemical fertilizer among area farmers. According to an ADB press release in 2015, the program to clean up the lake has been successful based on "strong and consistent political leadership, integrated planning and analysis, effective management structures, and financial engineering."

== See also ==
- Chao Hu Lake archaeological sites
