= Line S4 (Nanjing Metro) =

Metro line in Anhui and Jiangsu, China

Nanjing–Chuzhou line
- S4

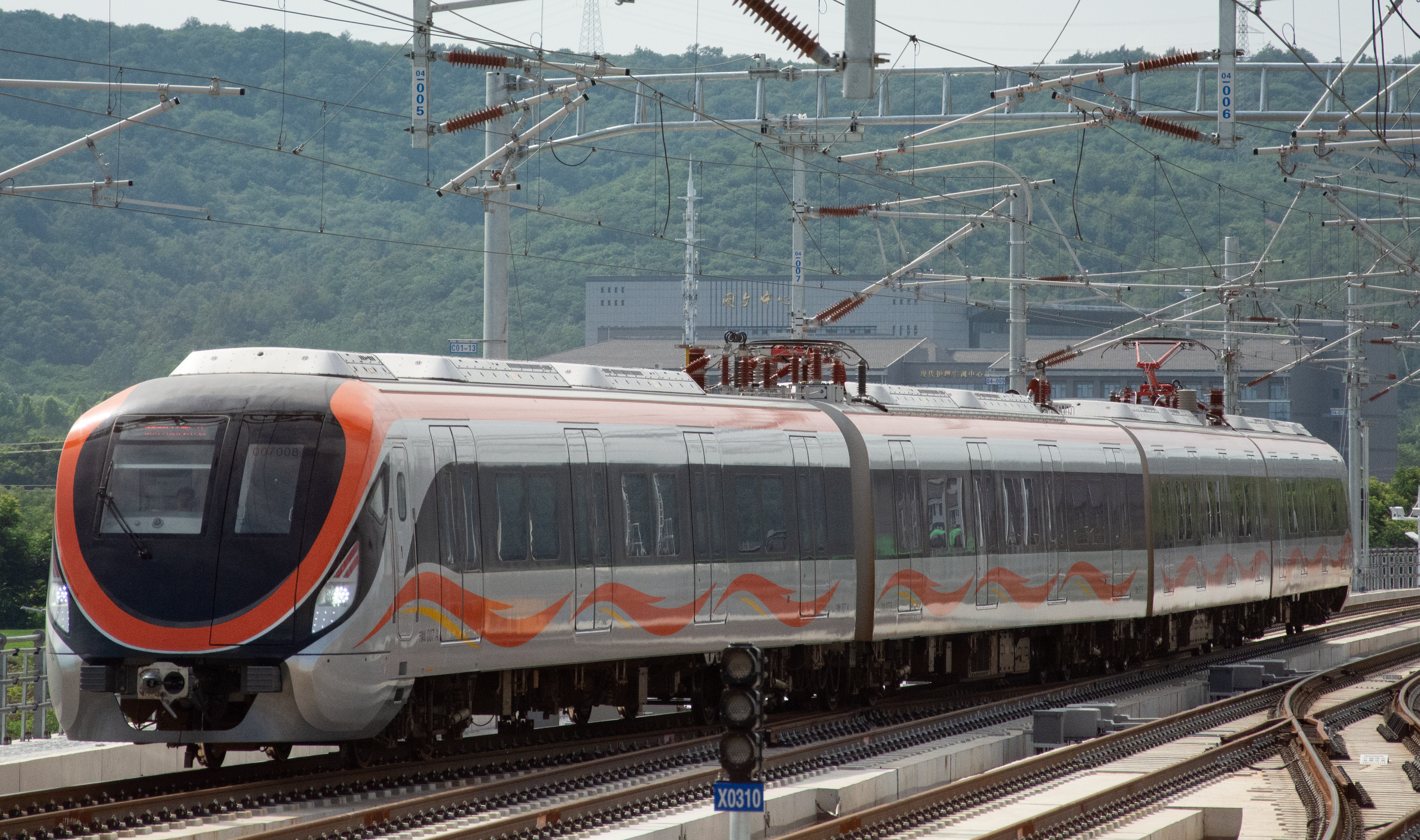
- A train of Line S4 is entering Huaboyuan

Overview
- Other names: Ningchu Line; Ningchu Intercity Railway; Nanjing–Chuzhou line; Nanjing-Chuzhou Intercity railway; Nanjing-Chuhe Intercity railway; Chuzhou Rail Transit Line 1; Chuning Intercity Railway
- Status: In operation (Chuzhou section); Under construction (Nanjing section)
- Locale: Chuzhou, Anhui and Nanjing, Jiangsu
- Termini: Chuzhou Railway Station; Chahe
- Stations: 10

Service
- Type: Rapid Transit
- System: Nanjing Metro
- Operator(s): Nanjing Metro Operation Co., Ltd. Chuzhou Rail Transit Operation Co., Ltd.
- Rolling stock: 4-car Class D Express train

History
- Opened: 28 June 2023; 3 years ago

Technical
- Line length: 46.2 km (28.7 mi)
- Character: Elevated and Underground
- Track gauge: 1,435 mm (4 ft 8 1/2 in)
- Electrification: AC 25KV 50Hz with overhead catenary

Line S4, commonly known as Nanjing–Chuzhou line or Chuzhou Rail Transit Line 1 or Ningchu line, is a rapid transit line of Nanjing Metro connecting Chuzhou and Nanjing in both Anhui and Jiangsu provinces of China. It is 46.2 kilometres (28.7 mi) long and has a maximum operating speed of 120 kilometres per hour (75 mph). Currently most of the Chuzhou section opened on 28 June 2023, with a little part of the rest of the Chuzhou section and Nanjing section still under construction.

== Stations ==

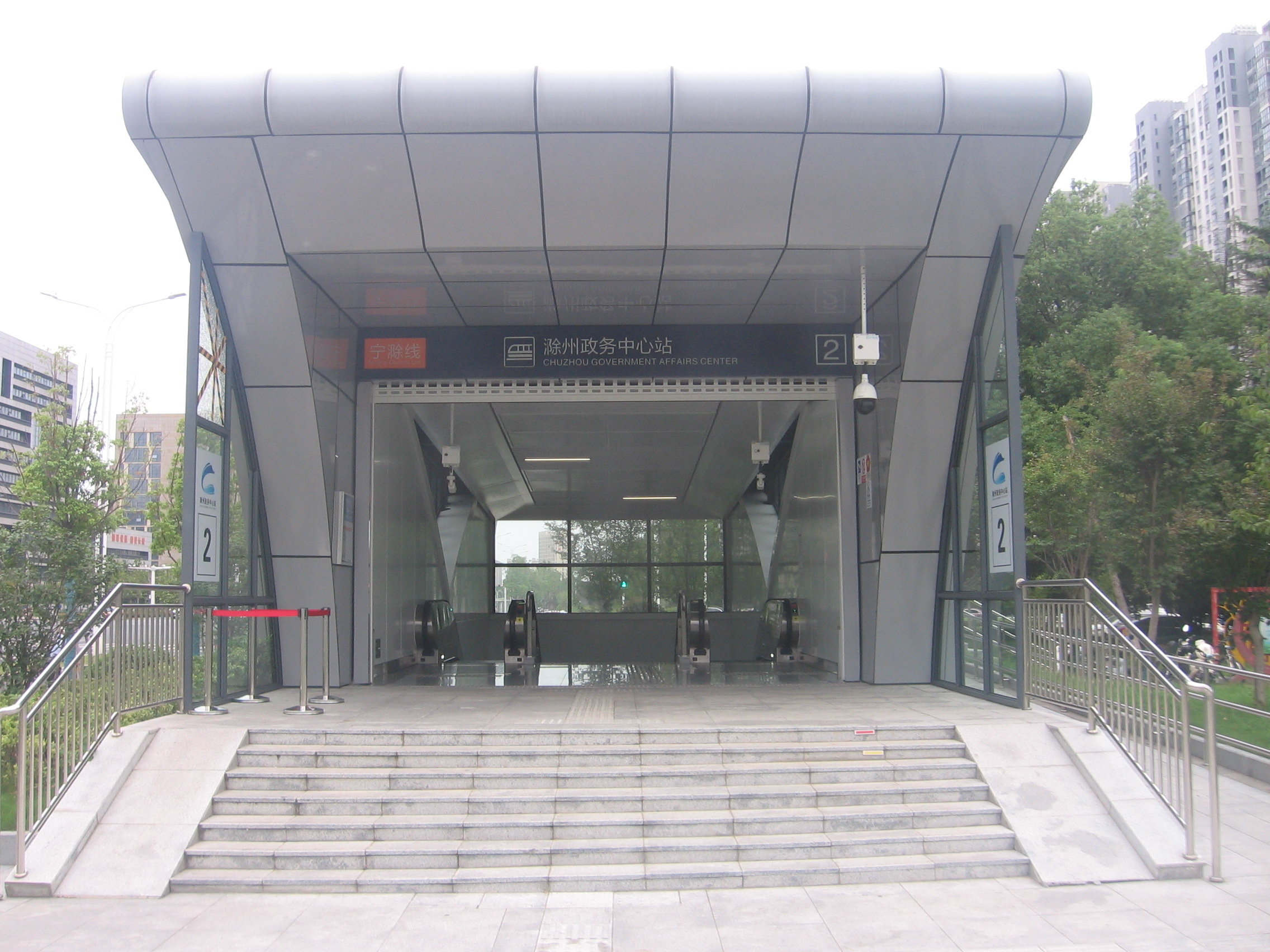
Chuzhou Government Affairs Center Station

Station name		Connections	Distance km		Location	
English	Chinese	Connections	Distance km		Location	
Chuzhou Railway Station	滁州高铁站	Chuzhou	0.0	0.0	Quanjiao	Chuzhou, Anhui
Yaopu (reserved)	腰铺		-		Nanqiao	Chuzhou, Anhui
Huaboyuan	花博园		5.9	5.9	Nanqiao	Chuzhou, Anhui
Langyashan	琅琊山		2.9	8.8	Langya / Nanqiao	Chuzhou, Anhui
Chuzhou Government Affairs Center	滁州政务中心		2.5	11.3	Nanqiao	Chuzhou, Anhui
Danzi (reserved)	担子		-		Nanqiao	Chuzhou, Anhui
Suchu Business Center	苏滁商务中心		5.9	17.2	Nanqiao	Chuzhou, Anhui
Dawangying	大王郢		3.7	20.9	Nanqiao	Chuzhou, Anhui
Linlou	林楼		2.6	23.5	Nanqiao	Chuzhou, Anhui
Shuikou (reserved)	水口		-		Lai'an	Chuzhou, Anhui
Shierliban	十二里半		9.9	33.4	Lai'an	Chuzhou, Anhui
Xiangguan (reserved)	相官		-		Lai'an	Chuzhou, Anhui
Chahexincheng	汊河新城		9.6	43.0	Lai'an	Chuzhou, Anhui
Chahe	汊河		3.2	46.2	Lai'an	Chuzhou, Anhui
Zhangbao	张堡				Lai'an	Chuzhou, Anhui
Pancheng	盘城				Pukou, Nanjing, Jiangsu	
Nanjing North Railway Station	南京北站	Nanjing North (U/C) 3 4 15 18			Pukou, Nanjing, Jiangsu	
