= Chuzhou Railway Station station =

Nanjing Metro station

Coordinates: 32.2017°N 118.3163°E

Chuzhou Railway Station 滁州高铁站
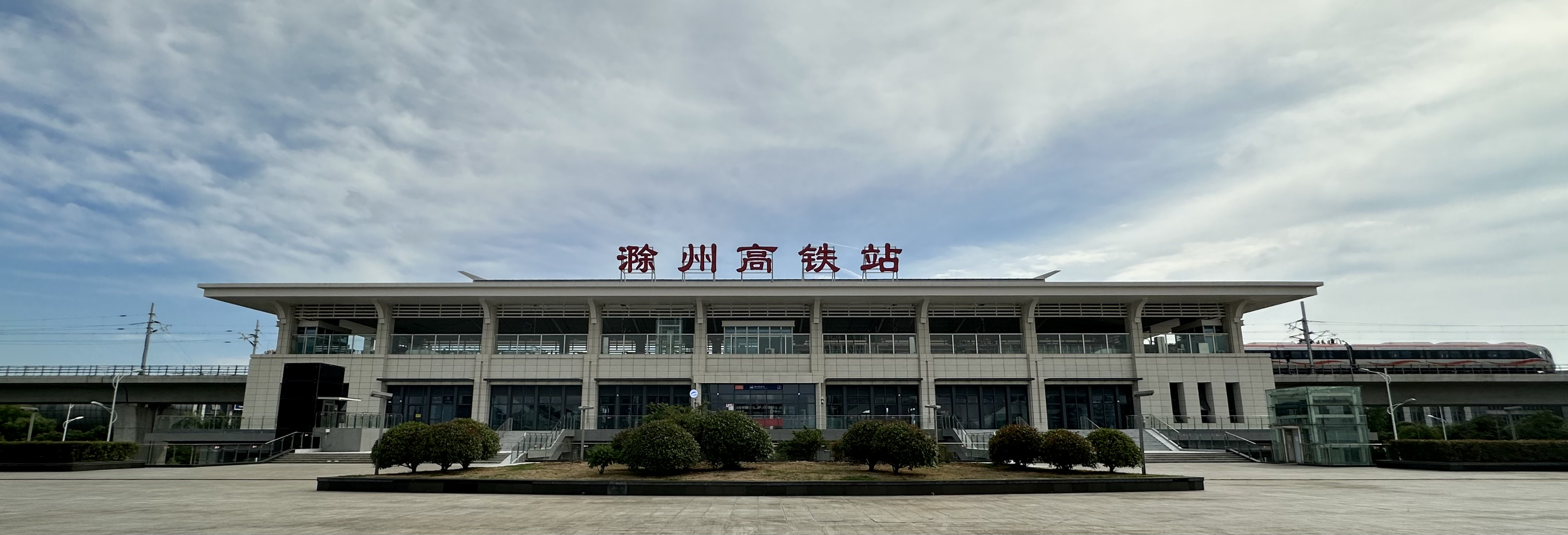
- Station building of Chuzhou Railway Station of Nanjing Metro

General information
- Location: Nanqiao District, Chuzhou, Anhui; China
- Operated by: Nanjing Metro Co. Ltd.
- Line: Line S4
- Platforms: 2
- Connections: Chuzhou railway station

Construction
- Structure type: Elevated

History
- Opened: 28 June 2023

Services
Preceding station	Nanjing Metro	Following station
Yaopu towards Chahe	Line S4	Terminus
Location

Chuzhou Railway Station station (simplified Chinese: 滁州高铁站; traditional Chinese: 滁州高鐵站) is a terminal station of Line S4 of the Nanjing Metro. It started operations together with the rest of the line on 28 June 2023.
