= Qing literati =

Chinese scholars in the Qing dynasty

Qing literati (Chinese: 文人; pinyin: wénrén) were scholars in the Qing dynasty (1644-1912) educated in the Confucian curriculum, the "Four Books and Five Classics", and sometimes called "shi" (士), scholar, and "shen" (绅), or gentry. They were defined by their education and lifestyle, whether or not they gained their ambition of passing the imperial examinations or becoming scholar-officials. They typically began their studies when young. They attempted to pass three tests throughout their lives. Candidates who achieved the lower degree were called shengyuan (生员); those who passed the second level could take the third and highest test, held in Beijing every three years; those who passed this highest test were jinshi.

== Literati life ==
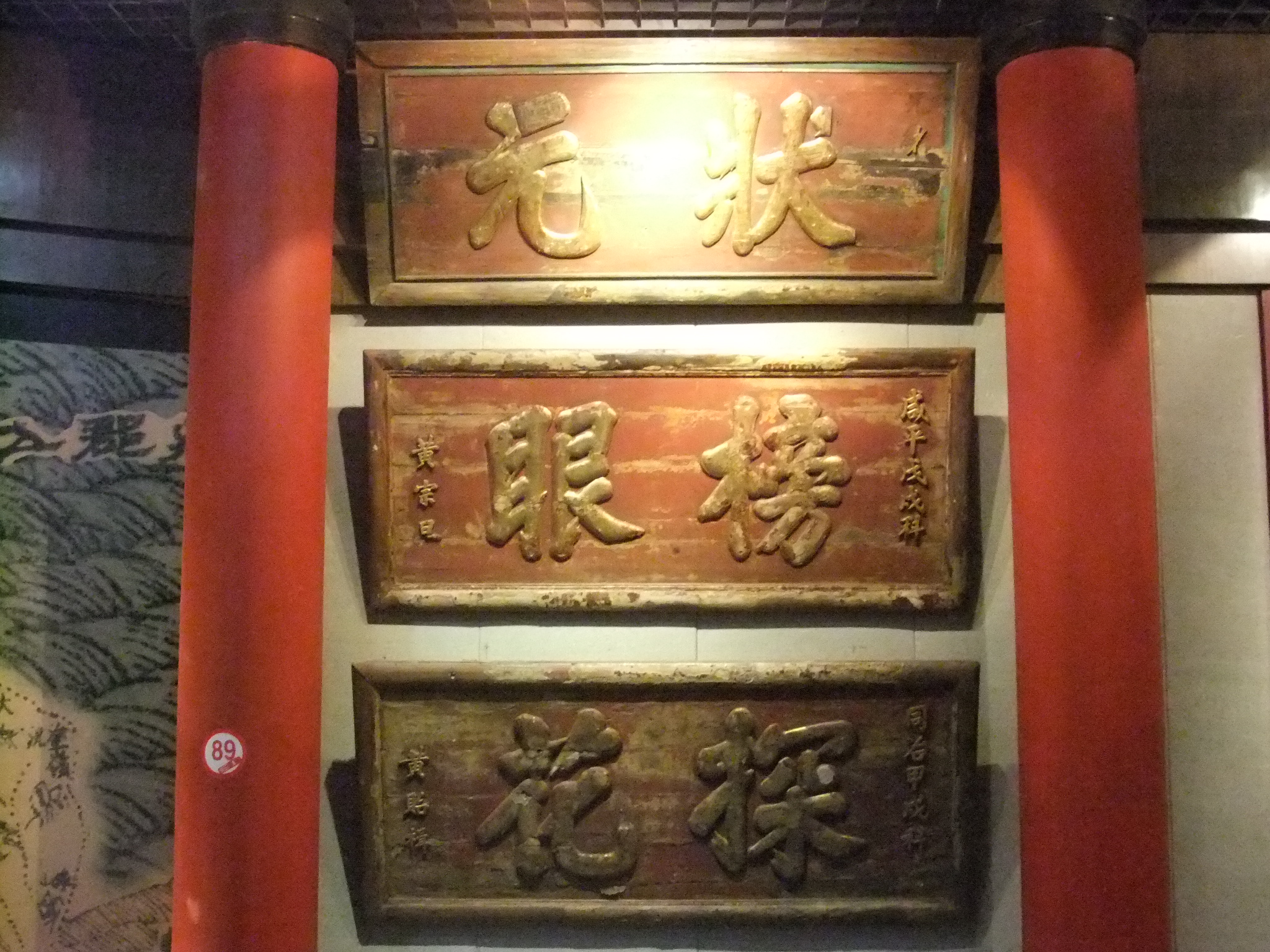
Horizontal inscribed boards with the titles of the imperial exam winners: zhuangyuan 状元 (1st place)，bangyan 榜眼 (2nd)，tanhua 探花 (3rd). Qing dynasty.

Examination success meant earning a chance of appointment to office, but those chances changed dramatically from Ming to Qing as the population rose but the number of official positions did not. All but palace degree-holders had far less opportunity by the late Ming, while in the Qing even palace degree-holders frequently had to wait years to gain an appointment as a magistrate or prefect. Social prestige, legal privileges and corvée labor exemptions kept most commoner families from competing in the examination market. The diminishing opportunities for examination success by the nineteenth century exacerbated tensions and human frailties.

The system brought fame and fortune to a few, but left most dealing with disappointment. Those who failed mocked the exams in popular novels, such as Wu Jingzi's (1701-1754) The Scholars, and vernacular stories by Pu Songling (1640-1715). Such narratives looked at the examination process from the point of view of the failures. These nonofficial accounts used dreams and auspicious events to explain success or failure.

== See also ==
- Literary inquisition
