= Mingguang =

Coordinates: 32°47′N 117°58′E

Mingguang 明光市 Mingkwang
- County-level city
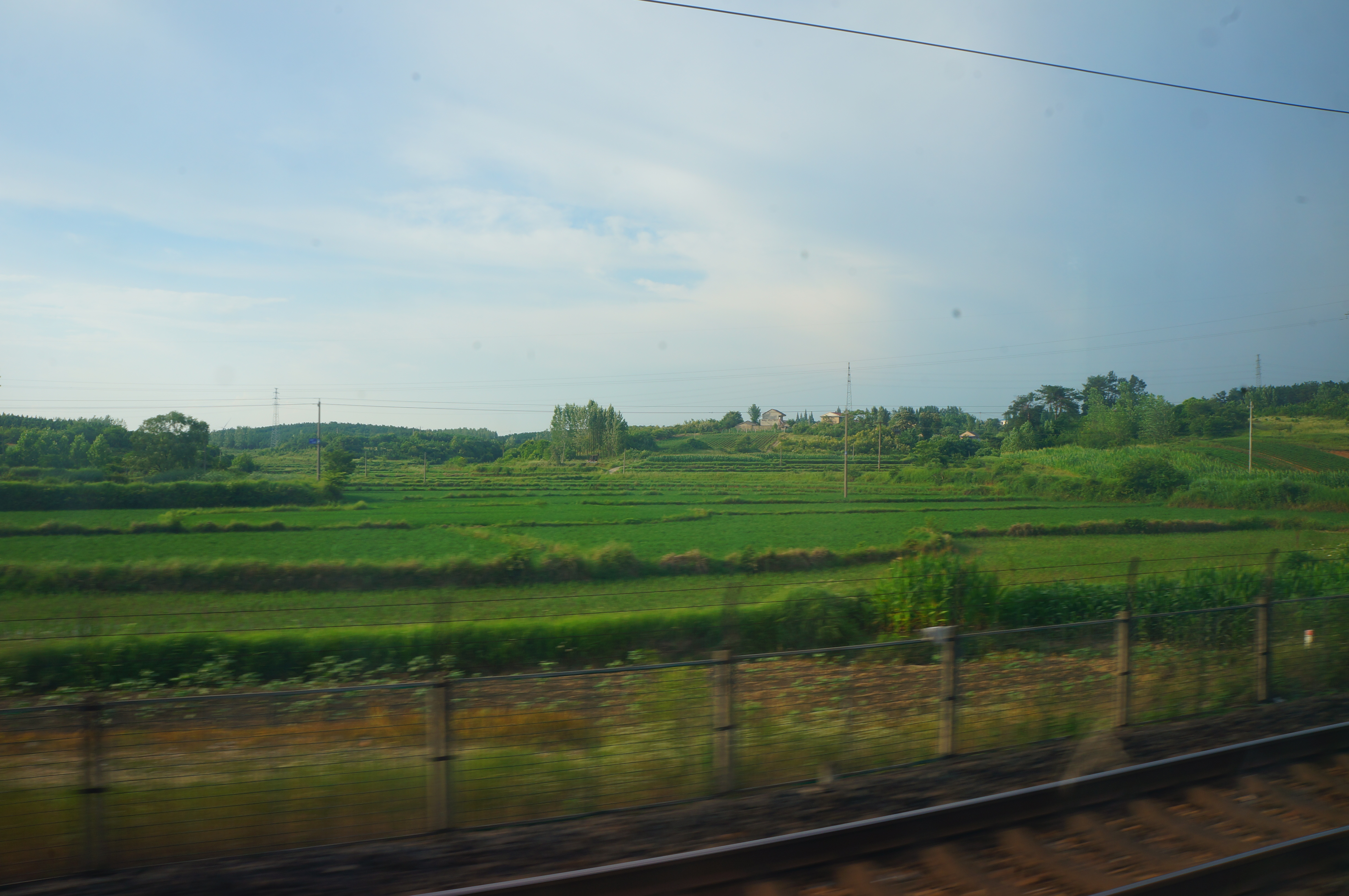
- Interactive map of Mingguang
- Country: People's Republic of China
- Province: Anhui
- Prefecture-level city: Chuzhou

Area
  - Total: 2,335 km^{2} (902 sq mi)

Population (2018)
  - Total: 645,000
- Time zone: UTC+8 (China Standard)
- Postal code: 239400
- Website: https://www.mingguang.gov.cn/

Mingguang (Chinese: 明光; pinyin: Míngguāng), formerly Jiashan County (嘉山县; Jiāshān Xiàn), is a county-level city in the northeast of Anhui Province, China, bordering Jiangsu province to the northeast and east. It is under the administration of Chuzhou city.

== Geography ==
Mingguang City is on the north-eastern edge of Anhui Province. The Huai River forms part of its northeast border. Bordering county-level divisions are Lai'an County to the southeast, Nanqiao District to the south, Dingyuan County to the southwest, Fengyang County to the west, Wuhe County to the northwest, and, in Jiangsu, Sihong and Xuyi counties.

=== Climate ===
Mingguang City lies on the Northern Subtropical Zone. The average temperature of Mingguang City for the whole year is 15 °C. The average annual rainfall is 954.1 mm (37.56 in).

Climate data for Mingguang, elevation 31 m (102 ft), (1991–2020 normals, extremes 1981–present)
Month	Jan	Feb	Mar	Apr	May	Jun	Jul	Aug	Sep	Oct	Nov	Dec	Year
Record high °C (°F)	21.8 (71.2)	26.4 (79.5)	33.5 (92.3)	33.7 (92.7)	37.2 (99.0)	38.3 (100.9)	39.7 (103.5)	39.9 (103.8)	38.7 (101.7)	34.1 (93.4)	29.1 (84.4)	22.9 (73.2)	39.9 (103.8)
Mean daily maximum °C (°F)	6.6 (43.9)	9.6 (49.3)	15.0 (59.0)	21.6 (70.9)	26.9 (80.4)	29.9 (85.8)	32.2 (90.0)	31.4 (88.5)	27.6 (81.7)	22.6 (72.7)	15.9 (60.6)	9.2 (48.6)	20.7 (69.3)
Daily mean °C (°F)	2.2 (36.0)	4.9 (40.8)	9.8 (49.6)	16.2 (61.2)	21.6 (70.9)	25.4 (77.7)	28.1 (82.6)	27.4 (81.3)	23.1 (73.6)	17.5 (63.5)	10.8 (51.4)	4.4 (39.9)	16.0 (60.7)
Mean daily minimum °C (°F)	−1.1 (30.0)	1.3 (34.3)	5.6 (42.1)	11.5 (52.7)	17.0 (62.6)	21.4 (70.5)	24.8 (76.6)	24.2 (75.6)	19.5 (67.1)	13.5 (56.3)	6.8 (44.2)	0.9 (33.6)	12.1 (53.8)
Record low °C (°F)	−13.7 (7.3)	−12.5 (9.5)	−6.0 (21.2)	0.4 (32.7)	7.2 (45.0)	12.3 (54.1)	18.0 (64.4)	16.0 (60.8)	11.4 (52.5)	1.9 (35.4)	−6.2 (20.8)	−15.2 (4.6)	−15.2 (4.6)
Average precipitation mm (inches)	36.1 (1.42)	40.4 (1.59)	60.9 (2.40)	58.9 (2.32)	85.8 (3.38)	139.6 (5.50)	190.7 (7.51)	156.8 (6.17)	82.9 (3.26)	46.7 (1.84)	45.4 (1.79)	26.3 (1.04)	970.5 (38.22)
Average precipitation days (≥ 0.1 mm)	6.9	7.8	8.8	8.0	8.5	9.9	12.2	12.0	8.1	7.0	7.3	6.1	102.6
Average snowy days	3.9	2.7	1.1	0	0	0	0	0	0	0	0.8	1.4	9.9
Average relative humidity (%)	72	71	68	67	68	73	80	81	77	71	72	71	73
Mean monthly sunshine hours	129.5	132.8	166.7	196.2	199.7	170.6	190.9	189.2	171.0	172.0	151.0	140.1	2,009.7
Percentage possible sunshine	41	42	45	50	47	40	44	46	47	49	49	45	45
Source: China Meteorological Administration all-time January high

== Administrative divisions ==
Nowadays, Mingguang is divided to 4 subdistricts, 12 towns and 1 township.

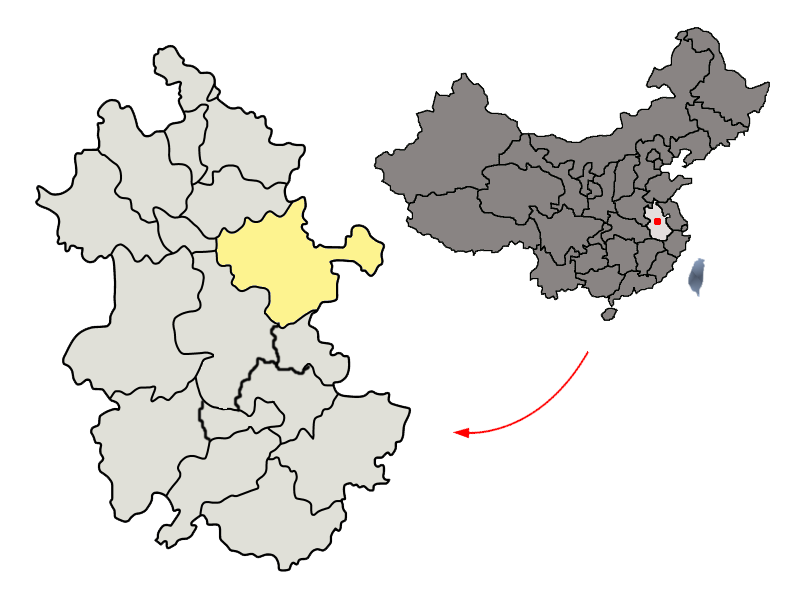
Location of Chuzhou in the province

4 Subdistricts

- Mingdong (明东街道)
- Mingnan (明南街道)
- Mingxi (明西街道)
- Mingguang (明光街道)

12 Towns

- Jianxi (涧溪镇)
- Guandian (管店镇)
- Nüshanhu (女山湖镇)
- Zilaiqiao (自来桥镇)
- Sanjie (三界镇)
- Shiba (石坝镇)
- Suxiang (苏巷镇)
- Zhangbaling (张八岭镇)
- Qiaotou (桥头镇)
- Gupei (古沛镇)
- Pancun (潘村镇)
- Liuxiang (柳巷镇)

1 Township

- Bogang (泊岗乡)

== Demographics ==
Most of the people living in Mingguang City are Han people. According to 2015 data, Mingguang has a total population of 655,000.

== Economy ==
Mingguang's economy relies much on agriculture and its appendages.

== Notable people ==
- Wang Daohan (汪道涵)

== Tourism ==
- Nv Shan Geographic Park (女山地质公园)

== Education ==
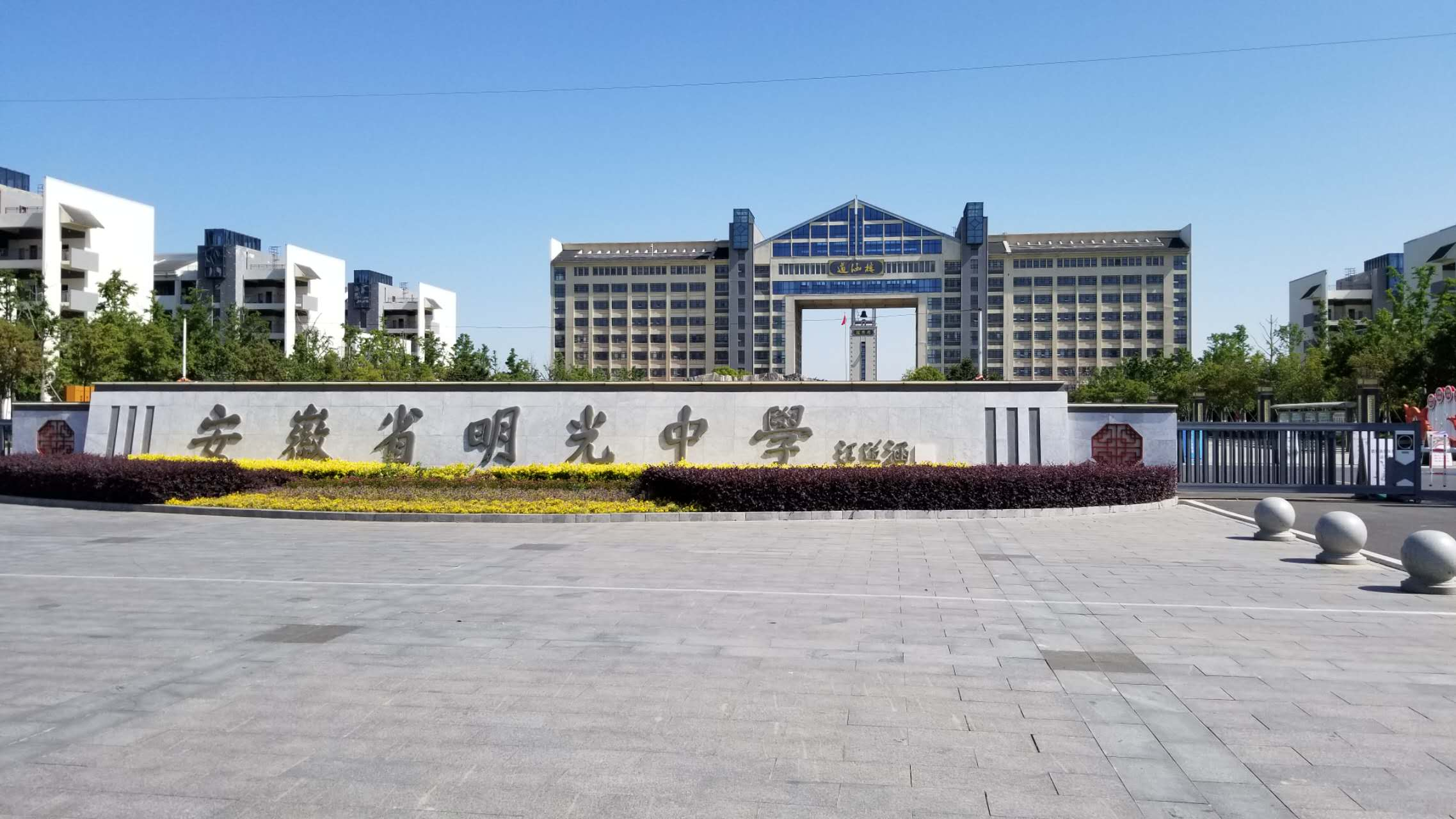
Mingguang High School (Formerly Jiashan High School)

According to 2016 data, Mingguang City has a total of 187 schools, including elementary schools, secondary schools, and places for higher learning.
