= Chuchow =

Chuchow and Chu'chow were postal romanizations of the names of three Chinese cities:

- Quzhou, a city in western Zhejiang province
- Zhuzhou, a city in Hunan province
- Chuzhou, a city in eastern Anhui province
