= Chahe, Anhui =

Chahe 汊河镇
- Town
- Location in China
- Coordinates: 32°12′30″N 118°35′26″E
- Country: People's Republic of China
- Province: Anhui
- Prefecture-level city: Chuzhou
- County: Lai'an County
- Time zone: UTC+8 (China Standard)

Chahe (Chinese: 汊河; pinyin: Chāhé) is a town in Lai'an County, Anhui. As of 2020, it administers the following neighborhoods, communities, residential zones, and villages:

- Jingangwan (金港湾)
- Tianhe Community (天河社区)
- Linxi Community (临溪社区)
- Xiangrong Community (向荣社区)
- Yangminghu Community (阳明湖社区)
- Chahe Economic Development Zone Community (汊河经济开发区社区)
- Wangbodang Farm Residential Zone (汪波荡农场生活区)
- Chahe Village
- Tangqiao Village (唐桥村)
- Wenshan Village (文山村)
- Zhangpu Village (张堡村)
- Chengji Village (程集村)
- Huangpai Village (黄牌村)
- Dongqing Village (董青村)
- Wanglai Village (王来村)
- Xiangguan Village (相官村)
- Daya Village (大雅村)
- Chentang Village (陈塘村)
- Chumao Village (储茂村)
