= Machang, Anhui =

Machang 马厂镇
- Town
- Interactive map of Machang
- Coordinates: 32°03′58″N 118°00′06″E
- Country: People's Republic of China
- Province: Anhui
- Prefecture-level city: Chuzhou
- County: Quanjiao
- Village-level divisions: 1 residential community 11 villages

Area
  - Total: 86.99 km^{2} (33.59 sq mi)
- Elevation: 44 m (144 ft)

Population
  - Total: 28,900
  - Density: 332/km^{2} (860/sq mi)
- Time zone: UTC+8 (China Standard)
- Postal code: 239500
- Area code: 0550

Machang (simplified Chinese: 马厂; traditional Chinese: 馬廠; pinyin: Mǎchǎng; lit. 'horse yard') is a town of Quanjiao County in eastern Anhui province, China, located approximately midway between Nanjing (Jiangsu) and Hefei and 25 kilometres (16 mi) west of the county seat and 40 km (25 mi) southwest of Chuzhou. As of 2011, it has 16 villages under its administration. The Hefei–Nanjing Passenger Railway passes through the town.

== See also ==
- List of township-level divisions of Hebei
