= Chuzhou North railway station =

Railway station in Chuzhou, Anhui, China

Chuzhou North 滁州北
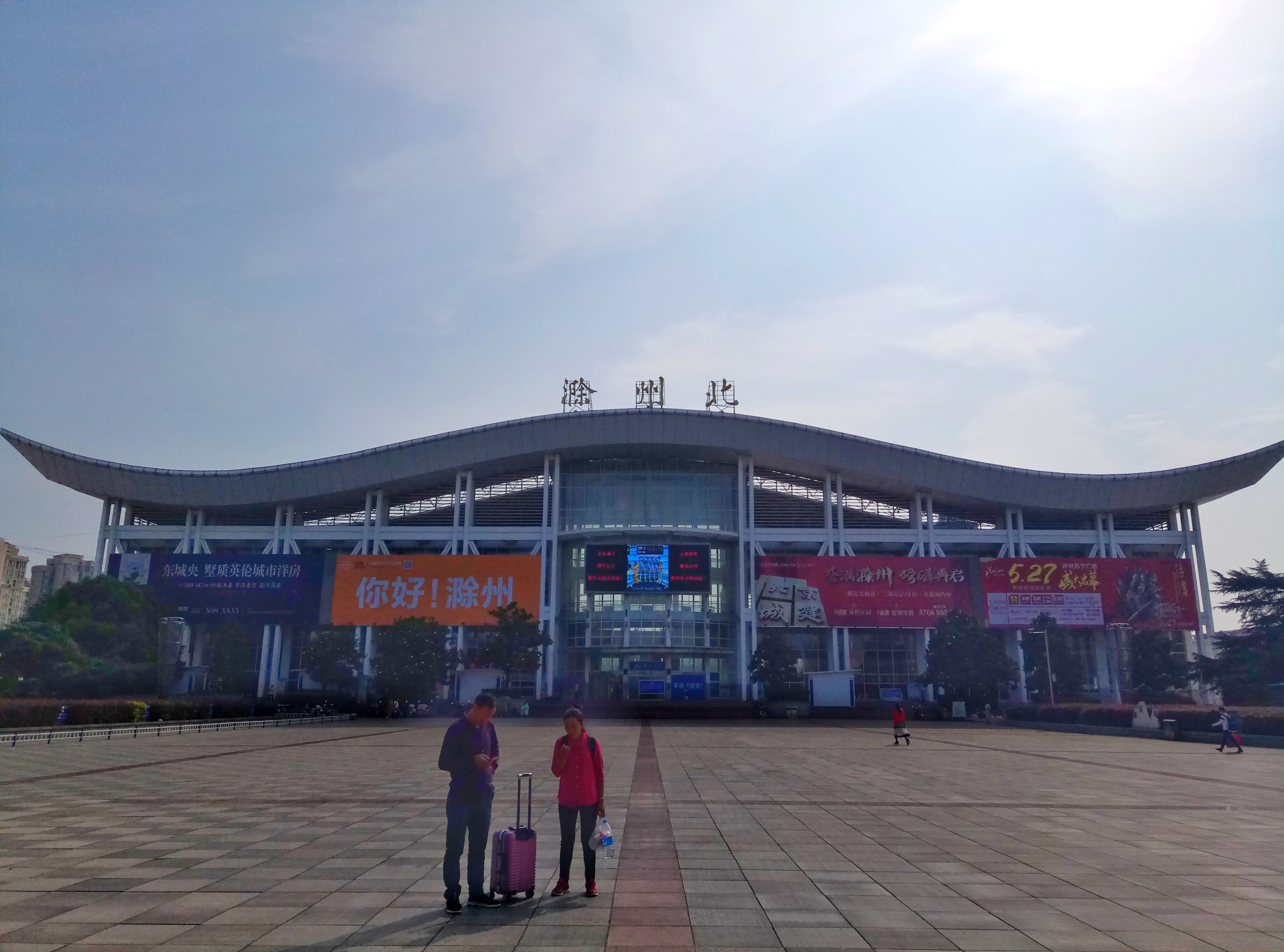

General information
- Location: Langya District, Chuzhou, Anhui; China
- Coordinates: 32.310152°N 118.321786°E
- Line: Beijing–Shanghai railway
Location

Chuzhou North railway station (Chinese: 滁州北站) is a railway station in Langya District, Chuzhou, Anhui, China. It is an intermediate stop on the Beijing–Shanghai railway.

== History ==
On 1 January 2006, a new ticket hall was opened. On 1 June 2011 the name of this station was changed from Chuzhou to Chuzhou North, in preparation for the opening of the new Chuzhou railway station on the Beijing–Shanghai high-speed railway.

== See also ==
- Chuzhou railway station

Preceding station	China Railway	Following station
Mingguang towards Beijing	Beijing–Shanghai railway	Nanjing towards Shanghai
