= CXH =

CXH may refer to:

- Charing Cross Hospital in London, UK
- China Xinhua Airlines, the ICAO airline code
- Vancouver Harbour Water Airport, the IATA airport code
- Chloe x Halle, American R&B duo
- Chuzhou railway station, China Railway telegraph code CXH
