= Jianxi, Anhui =

Jianxi 涧溪镇
- Town
- Location in China
- Coordinates: 32°48′50″N 118°15′32″E
- Country: People's Republic of China
- Province: Anhui
- Prefecture-level city: Chuzhou
- County-level city: Mingguang
- Time zone: UTC+8 (China Standard)

Jianxi (simplified Chinese: 涧溪; traditional Chinese: 澗溪; pinyin: Jiànxī) is a town of Mingguang in Anhui province, China. As of 2018, it has 12 villages under its administration.
