= Dashu, Anhui =

Dashu 大墅镇
- Town
- Location in China
- Coordinates: 32°1′19″N 117°56′26″E
- Country: People's Republic of China
- Province: Anhui
- Prefecture-level city: Chuzhou
- County: Quanjiao County
- Time zone: UTC+8 (China Standard)

Dashu (Chinese: 大墅; pinyin: Dàshù) is a town under the administration of Quanjiao County, Anhui, China. As of 2018, it has two residential communities and 8 villages under its administration.
