= Yaopu =

Yaopu may refer to these towns in China:

- Yaopu, Anhui (腰铺), in Chuzhou, Anhui
- Yaopu, Guizhou (幺铺), in Anshun, Guizhou
