= Tianchang =

Coordinates: 32.6811°N 119.0137°E

Tianchang 天长市 Tienchang
- Sub-prefecture-level city
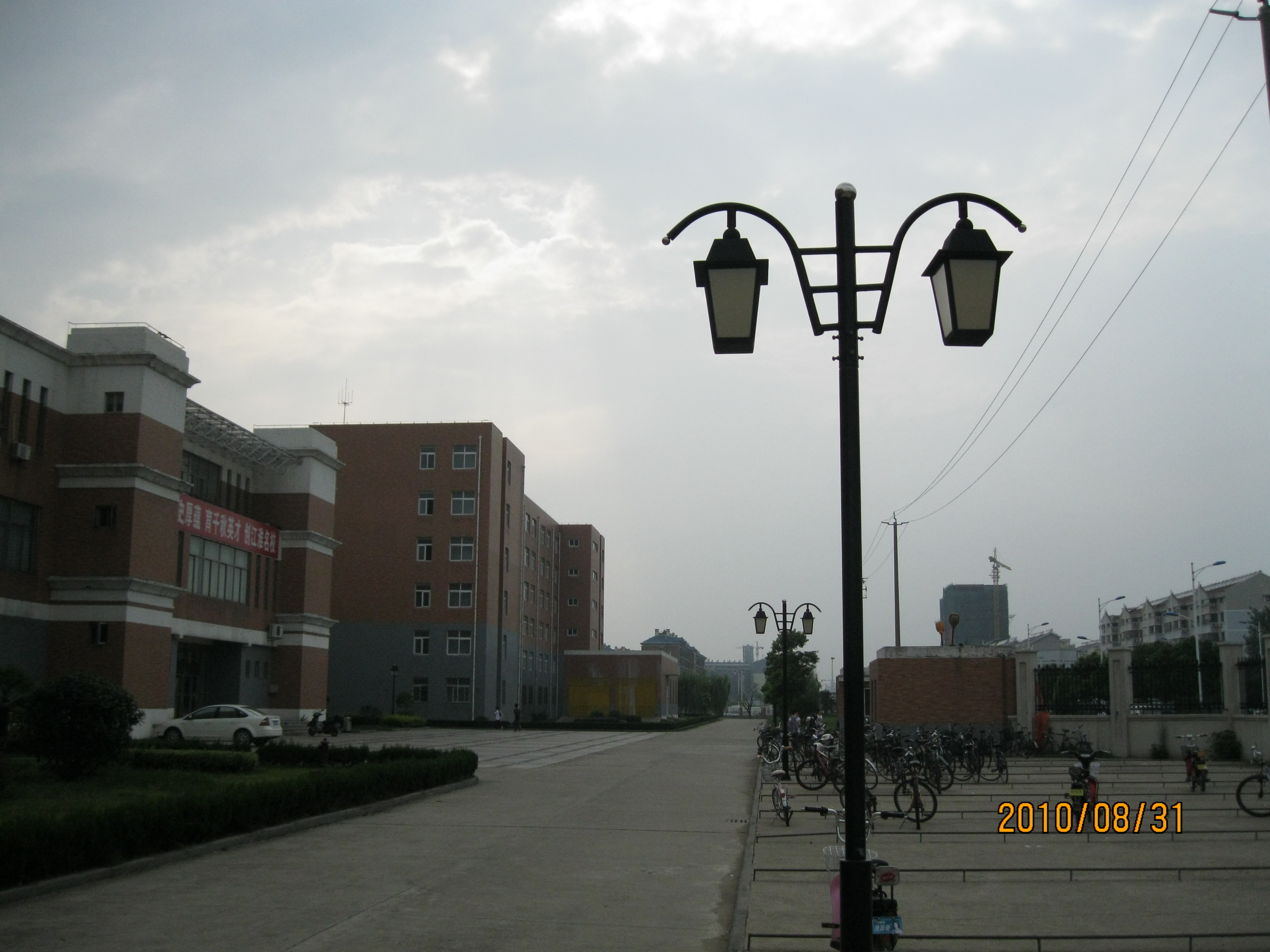
- Interactive map of Tianchang
- Country: People's Republic of China
- Province: Anhui
- Prefecture-level city: Chuzhou

Area
  - Total: 1,770 km^{2} (680 sq mi)

Population (2019)
  - Total: 628,900
- Time zone: UTC+8 (China Standard)
- Postal code: 239300

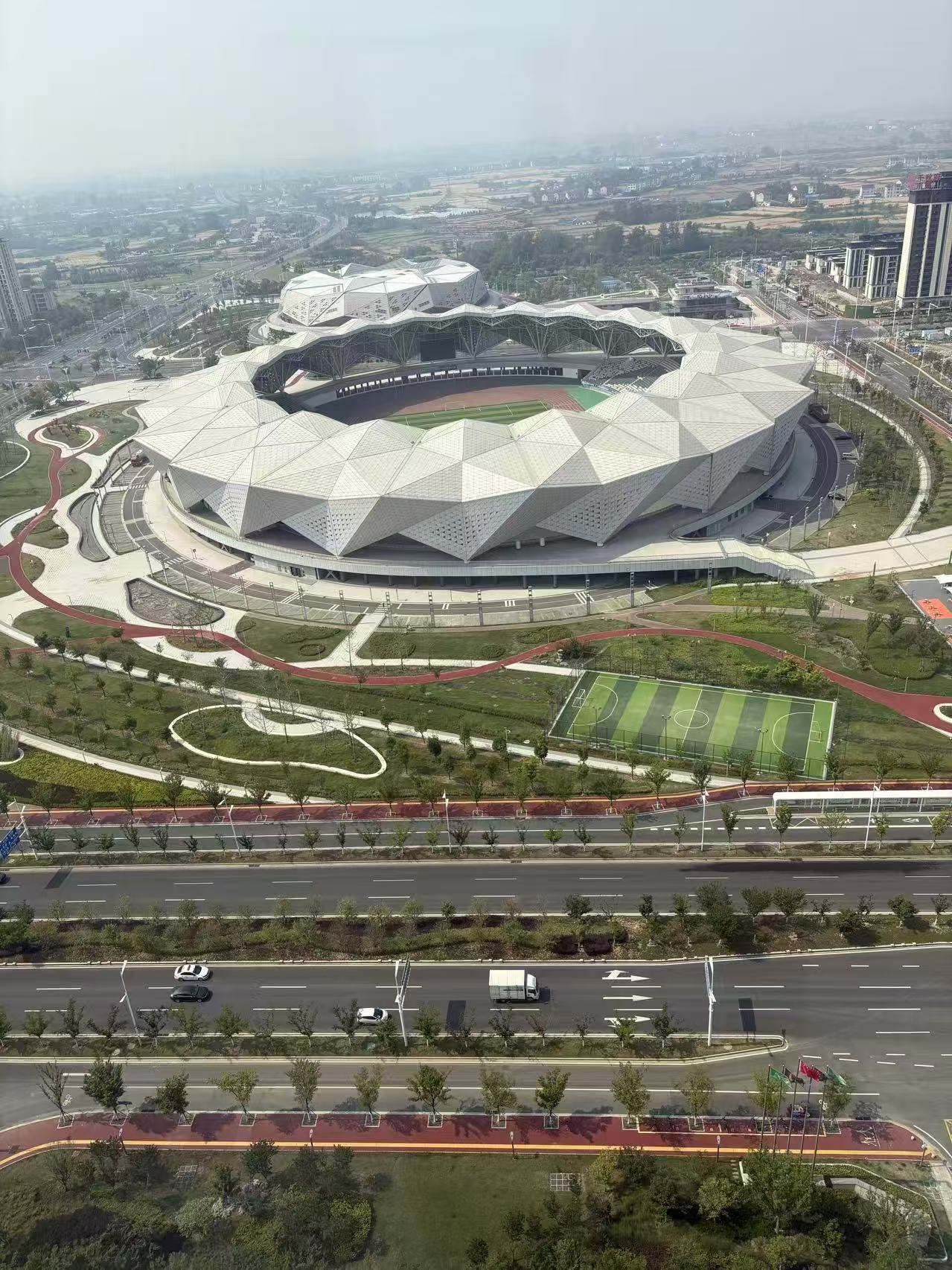
Tianchang stadium

Tianchang (simplified Chinese: 天长; traditional Chinese: 天長; pinyin: Tiāncháng) is a sub-prefecture-level city in the east of Anhui province. It is the closest city in the province to the mouth of the Yangtze River. It is bordered by the Jiangsu county-level divisions of Luhe District (Nanjing) to the southwest, Yizheng City to the southeast, Gaoyou City to the east, Jinhu County to the northeast, and Xuyi County to the northwest, as well as Anhui's Lai'an County to the west.

== Administrative divisions ==
Tianchang City has 1 subdistrict and 14 towns.

1 Subdistrict

- Tianchang Subdistrict (天长街道)

14 Towns

- Tongcheng (铜城镇)
- Chajian (汊涧镇)
- Qinlan (秦栏镇)
- Datong (大通镇)
- Yangcun (杨村镇)
- Shiliang (石梁镇)
- Jinji (金集镇)
- Yeshan (冶山镇)
- Zhengji (郑集镇)
- Zhangpu (张铺镇)
- Xinjie (新街镇)
- Wanshou (万寿镇)
- Yongfeng (永丰镇)
- Renheji (仁和集镇)

== Climate ==
Climate data for Tianchang, elevation 10 m (33 ft), (1991–2020 normals, extremes 1981–present)
Month	Jan	Feb	Mar	Apr	May	Jun	Jul	Aug	Sep	Oct	Nov	Dec	Year
Record high °C (°F)	21.4 (70.5)	26.9 (80.4)	33.5 (92.3)	33.1 (91.6)	36.5 (97.7)	37.0 (98.6)	38.6 (101.5)	38.7 (101.7)	37.0 (98.6)	33.1 (91.6)	28.0 (82.4)	22.6 (72.7)	38.7 (101.7)
Mean daily maximum °C (°F)	6.6 (43.9)	9.3 (48.7)	14.4 (57.9)	20.9 (69.6)	26.2 (79.2)	29.0 (84.2)	31.8 (89.2)	31.1 (88.0)	27.3 (81.1)	22.3 (72.1)	15.8 (60.4)	9.1 (48.4)	20.3 (68.6)
Daily mean °C (°F)	2.4 (36.3)	4.8 (40.6)	9.5 (49.1)	15.7 (60.3)	21.1 (70.0)	24.8 (76.6)	27.9 (82.2)	27.3 (81.1)	23.1 (73.6)	17.6 (63.7)	11.1 (52.0)	4.7 (40.5)	15.8 (60.5)
Mean daily minimum °C (°F)	−0.7 (30.7)	1.3 (34.3)	5.5 (41.9)	11.1 (52.0)	16.7 (62.1)	21.3 (70.3)	24.8 (76.6)	24.4 (75.9)	19.8 (67.6)	13.7 (56.7)	7.3 (45.1)	1.3 (34.3)	12.2 (54.0)
Record low °C (°F)	−11.6 (11.1)	−12.3 (9.9)	−5.8 (21.6)	−0.5 (31.1)	7.3 (45.1)	11.9 (53.4)	17.6 (63.7)	16.3 (61.3)	11.1 (52.0)	2.4 (36.3)	−5.5 (22.1)	−13.4 (7.9)	−13.4 (7.9)
Average precipitation mm (inches)	43.4 (1.71)	43.6 (1.72)	68.0 (2.68)	64.0 (2.52)	82.5 (3.25)	152.1 (5.99)	223.9 (8.81)	170.6 (6.72)	80.4 (3.17)	53.1 (2.09)	54.2 (2.13)	33.3 (1.31)	1,069.1 (42.1)
Average precipitation days (≥ 0.1 mm)	7.6	8.3	9.4	8.7	9.4	9.8	13.3	12.6	8.3	6.9	7.7	6.7	108.7
Average snowy days	3.6	2.5	0.8	0.1	0	0	0	0	0	0	0.5	1.2	8.7
Average relative humidity (%)	72	72	70	69	70	76	81	82	79	74	73	71	74
Mean monthly sunshine hours	133.4	131.6	163.3	186.4	191.4	155.7	179.7	186.1	163.6	167.3	148.2	142.2	1,948.9
Percentage possible sunshine	42	42	44	48	45	37	41	45	45	48	48	46	44
Source: China Meteorological Administration all-time January high
