= DYU =

DYU is a three-letter acronym with the meanings:

- Dayeh University, a university in Taiwan
- D'Youville University, a university in Buffalo, New York
- Design Your Universe, an album by Epica
- Dushanbe Airport (IATA code), the airport in Dushanbe, the capital city of Tajikistan
- Dingyuan railway station, China Railway pinyin code DYU

dyu is the ISO 639-2 and ISO 639-3 language code for Dyula language (in West Africa)
