= Wu Jingzi =

Chinese scholar and writer

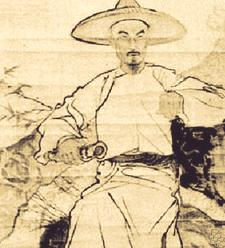
- Traditional Chinese: 吳敬梓
- Simplified Chinese: 吴敬梓
Transcriptions
Standard Mandarin
- Hanyu Pinyin: Wú Jìngzǐ

Wu Jingzi (Wu Ching-tzu) (1701—January 11, 1754) was a Chinese novelist during the Qing dynasty. He was born in the city now known as Quanjiao, Anhui and who died in Yangzhou, Jiangsu. He was the author of The Scholars, often seen as the foremost Chinese satiric novel.

== Biography ==
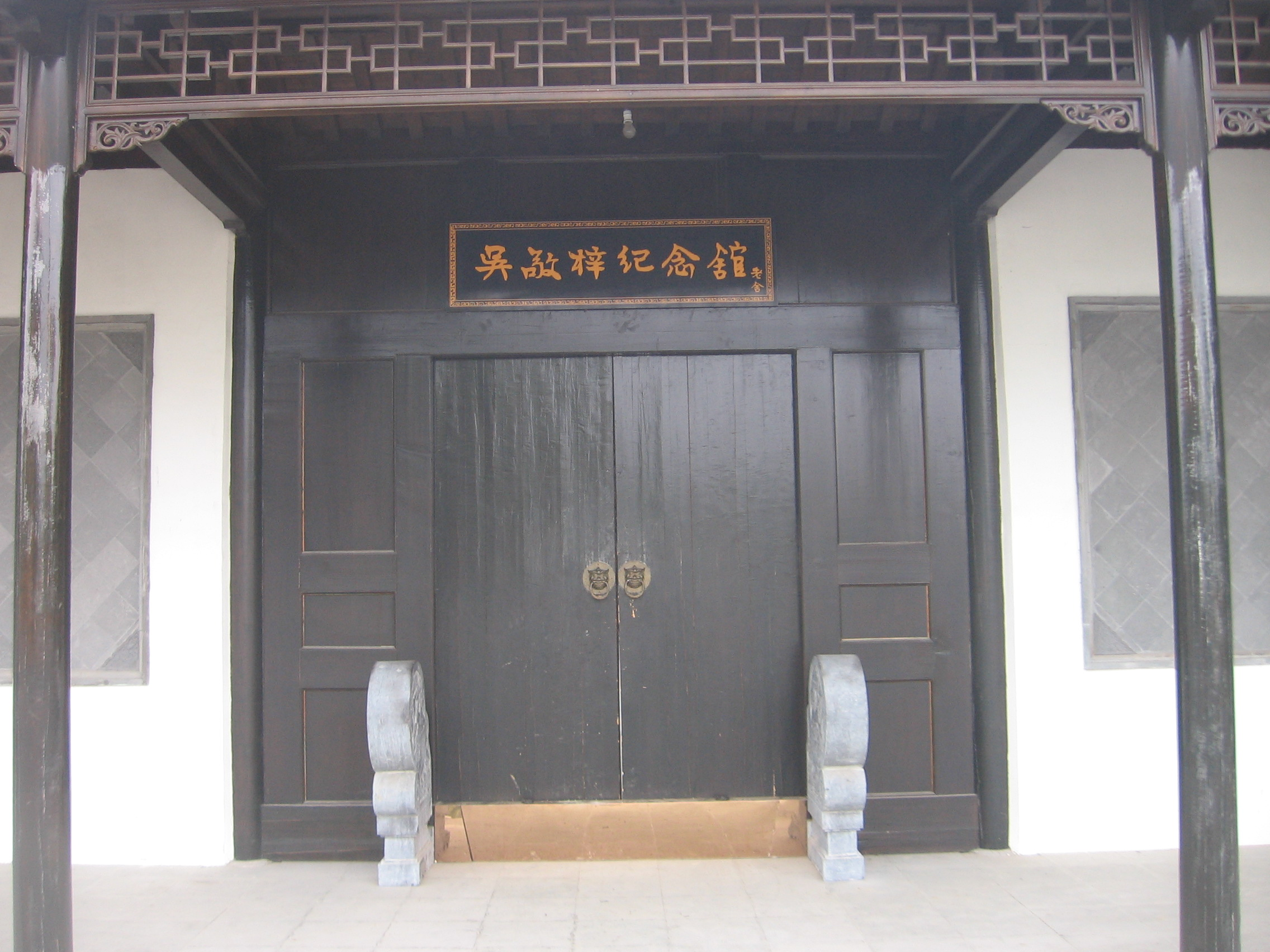
Wu Jingzi Memorial Hall in Quanjiao County, Chuzhou.

Cover of a copy of Wu's magnum opus The Scholars (volume one), from the National Library of China.

Wu was born into a well-to-do family. His father Wu Linqi (吳霖起) was a Qing official, but Wu Jingzi himself met with no success. He obtained the xiucai degree in 1720, but when people in Anhui criticized him for wasting his family fortune, he moved to Nanjing. Poverty-stricken by the age of thirty-two, he met and acquainted himself with many government officials but renounced ambition and did not attempt the exams. One report had it that he could not afford to buy fuel, and when the nights were cold, he and his friends would walk together outside the city walls, chatting and composing poetry, a tactic they called 暖足 ("warming our feet").

Wu's family may have had ties to the famous philosophers Yan Yuan and Li Gong (李塨). The philosophers emphasized the importance of ritual in Neo-Confucianism and may have influenced Wu's novel.

While in Nanjing, in 1740, he started his famous novel The Scholars. There is a museum in his honor located in his hometown of Quanjiao county, now Chuzhou.
