= Dingyuan railway station =

Railway station in Chuzhou, China

Dingyuan 定远
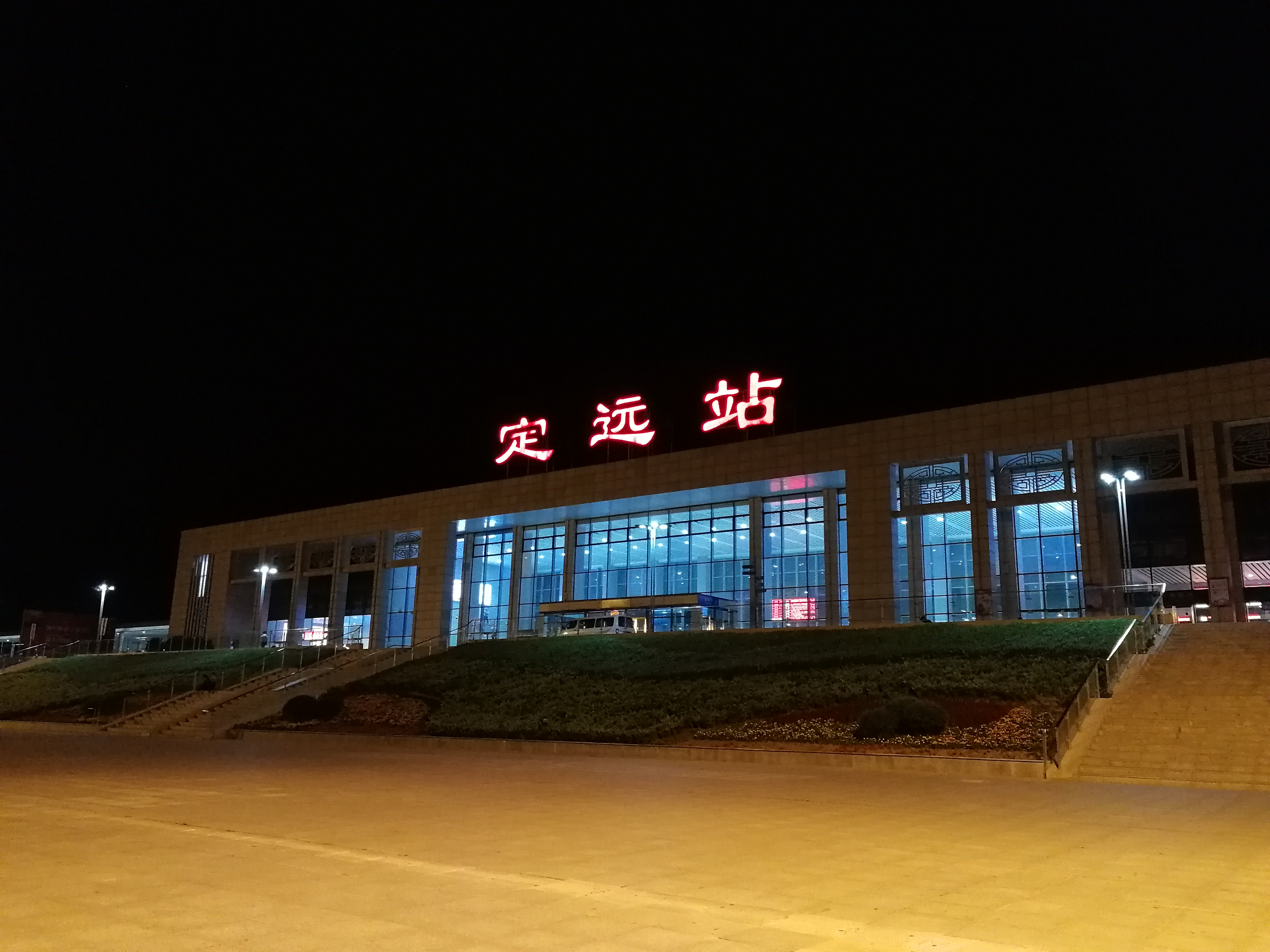

General information
- Location: Dingyuan County, Chuzhou, Anhui; China
- Coordinates: 32°34′38.75″N 117°50′14.20″E
- Operated by: Shanghai Railway Bureau; China Railway Corporation
- Line: Jinghu High-Speed Railway

Other information
- Station code: TMIS code: 66836; Telegraph code: EWH; Pinyin code: DYU
- Classification: 2nd class station

History
- Opened: June 30, 2011
Location

The Dingyuan railway station (Chinese: 定远站) is a high-speed railway station in Dingyuan County, Chuzhou, Anhui, People's Republic of China. It is served by the Jinghu High-Speed Railway.

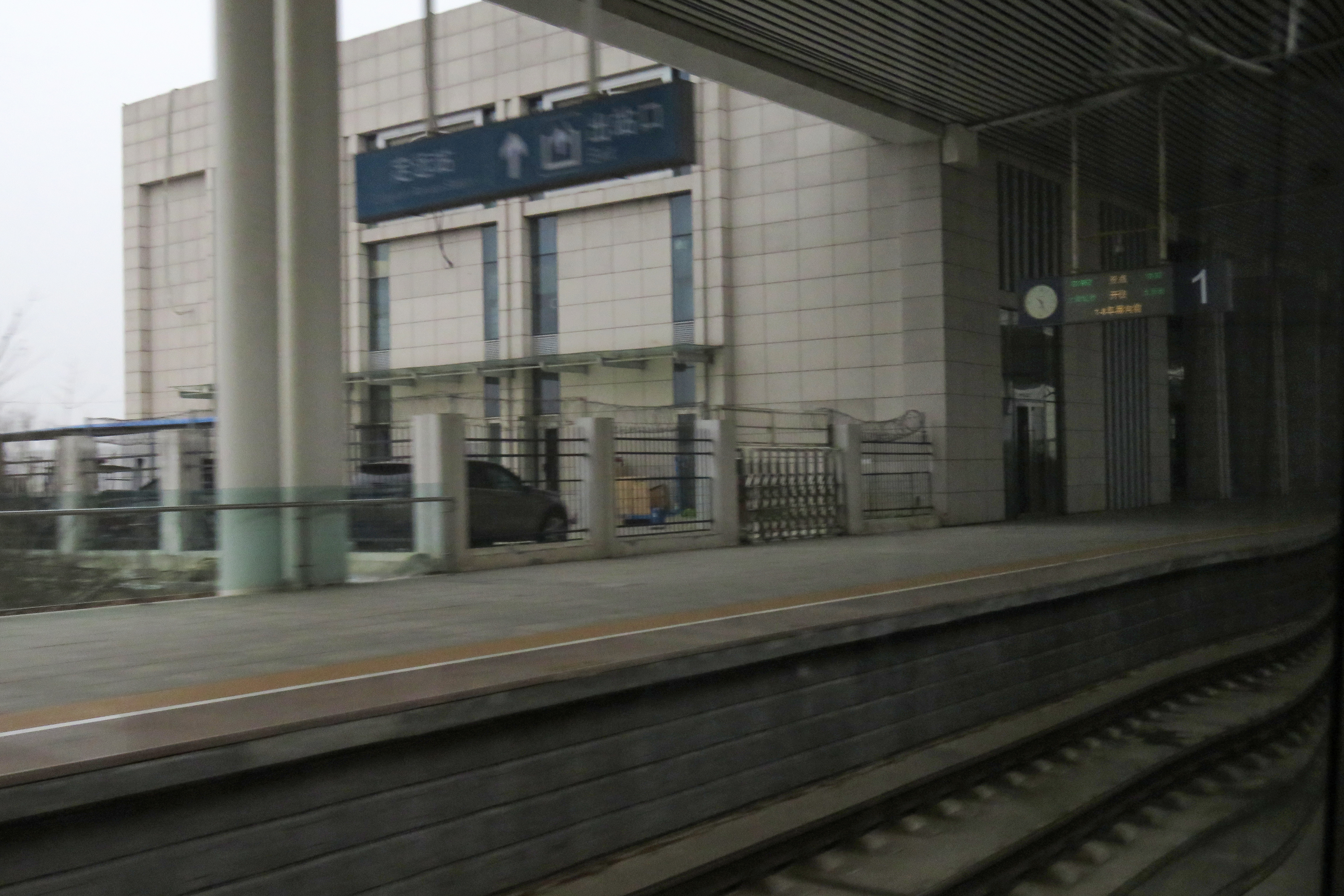
Platform

Preceding station	China Railway High-speed	Following station
Bengbu South towards Beijing South or Tianjin West	Beijing–Shanghai high-speed railway	Chuzhou towards Shanghai Hongqiao
