= Yaopu, Anhui =

Yaopu 腰铺镇
- Town
- Location within China
- Coordinates: 32°12′18″N 118°17′36″E
- Country: China
- Province: Anhui
- Prefecture-level city: Chuzhou
- District: Nanqiao District
- Time zone: UTC+8 (China Standard)

Yaopu (simplified Chinese: 腰铺; traditional Chinese: 腰鋪; pinyin: Yāopù) is a town of Nanqiao District, Chuzhou in eastern Anhui province, China. As of 2018, it has 4 residential communities and 5 villages under its administration.

== See also ==
- List of township-level divisions of Anhui
