= The Scholars (novel) =

18th-century Chinese satiric novel

- Cover of an early 20th-century edition of The Scholars from the Fudan University
- Author: Wu Jingzi
- Original title: 儒林外史
- Language: Written vernacular Chinese
- Genre: Historical fiction
- Set in: China, early 16th century AD
- Publication date: 1750
- Publication place: Qing China
- Media type: Print
- Dewey Decimal: 895.1348
- LC Class: PL2732.U22 J813

The Scholars
- Chinese: 儒林外史
- Literal meaning: An Unorthodox History of a Forest of Confucian Scholars
Transcriptions
Standard Mandarin
- Hanyu Pinyin: rúlín wàishǐ
- Wade–Giles: ju^{2}-lin^{2} wai^{4}-shih^{3}
- IPA: [ɻǔ.lǐn wâɪ.ʂì]
Yue: Cantonese
- Jyutping: jyu^{4} lam^{4} ngoi^{6} si^{2}

Printed edition of The Scholars from the eighth year of Jiaqing Emperor, from the National Library of China Publishing House

A critical commentary of The Scholars by Zhang Wenhu (1808–1885)

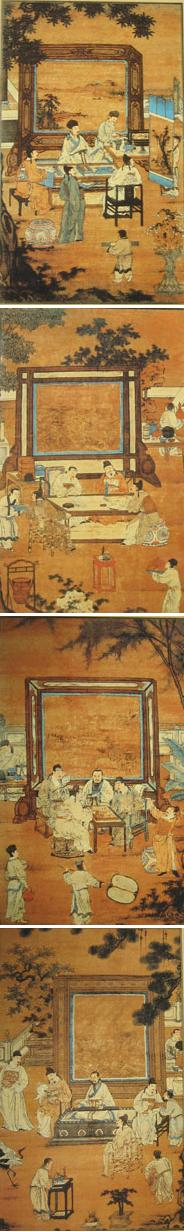
A Ming dynasty painting by Du Jin of various academic scholars

The Scholars (Chinese: 儒林外史; pinyin: Rúlín Wàishǐ), also translated as The Unofficial History of the Scholars, (Note: Other translations include An Unofficial History of the Scholars and The Unofficial History of the Forest of Scholars.) is a Chinese novel written by Wu Jingzi and published in 1750 during the Qing dynasty. It is considered one of the great "Classic Chinese Novels", and is distinguished for its unusual narrative structure and acerbic wit.

Set in the Ming period, The Scholars describes and often satirizes academic scholars. The novel's loose and sprawling narration often follows a lead character for several chapters, and then seamlessly transitions to another character who is introduced at a social gathering (such as a party or an event) of the previous character, with previous lead characters then appearing as a recurring guest or a minor character in the following vignettes. It features a large ensemble of characters, and most of the interconnected plotlines that form the bulk of the novel are didactic stories, on the one hand holding up exemplary Confucian behavior, but on the other ridiculing over-ambitious scholars and the imperial examination system.

Promoting naturalistic attitudes over belief in the supernatural, the author rejects the popular belief in retribution: his bad characters suffer no punishment. The characters in these stories are intellectuals, perhaps based on the author's friends and contemporaries. Although the novel's tone is highly caustic, a major incident in the novel is one of the main characters, Du Shaoqing's, attempt to renovate his family's ancestral temple, suggesting the author shared with Du a belief in the importance of Confucianism in life in spite of his criticism.

The Scholars paints a complex tapestry of interconnected and intricate scholarly lives and was one of the first major novels to seriously utilize a vernacular style now called baihua. Classical phrases (wenyan) appear occasionally, but only in the speech of elite characters. Language reformers in the early 20th-century New Culture Movement used the novel to support their view that wenyan was a form of snobbery. The novel has been described as "represents one of the highest achievements of the ‘literati novel’".

== Analysis ==
=== Content, meaning and ideology ===
The Scholars is a satirical novel that describes the life activities of various Chinese Confucian scholars, prudently set mostly in the early 16th century during the Ming dynasty that preceded the Qing. Addressing the ruling Qing dynasty could lead to capital punishment; thus it was safer to depict Ming intellectual life. Characters are obsessed by the fame and glory of civil service to the point of losing sanity. Some of them are philosophically dogmatic, rigidly following the old ways and denying all flexibility and innovation. Some are hypocrites, spending days talking about morality and ethics but actually living despicable and useless lives. Some are so corrupted that they eagerly sacrifice friends, relatives and family for ever more fame and glory. Via these scholars and the novel's sarcastic voices, Wu Jingzi indirectly criticized the civil service examination and education system under the Qing dynasty.

The historian F. W. Mote cautioned that there are other sides to the intellectual life of the dynasty. He praises the "essential rightness" of The Scholars' "mercilessly sardonic exposure of hollow moralizing and ritualized hypocrisy", but these Confucian scholars also reworked high culture's written heritage. It is easy, Mote went on, to parody minute textual and specialized studies, but they are now essential resources even today for any serious historical study. Wu Jingzi did create several "good" characters as model for an ideal Confucian scholar; they cannot be corrupted by fame or money and they despise the contemporary civil service. One of them, Du Shaoqing, bears strong similarity to the author: descended from a well-to-do family and later became poverty-stricken, hated the civil officials, expressed progressive ideas and was strongly critical of the popular Zhu Xi's Neo-Confucianism. Wu Jingzi also addresses women's role in society by portraying Du's kindly treatment of his wife at a time when women were considered inferior to men.

Zbigniew Słupski of the University of Warsaw describes The Scholars as one of the most difficult to characterize Chinese novels, "for it is at once a work of satire, social manners and morals as well as a confessional, historiographical, and philosophical novel." Moreover, "The novel transcends both concrete and abstract satire. The most important characteristics seems to be a rather dynamic and changing way of viewing the world. This [Wu] accomplishes by using new and innovative techniques."

=== Structure ===
Chinese commentators have traditionally seen The Scholars as having an irregular and much relaxed structure compared to other novels, and its "mosaic-like" narrative form has continued to fascinate and be scrutinized by modern critics. The famous author Lu Xun wrote that "the novel has no central linking element". Hu Shih echoed this view, writing that the novel "lacks a general structural basis". The same opinion has been put forth by some Western scholars, that the novel has no real "protagonist" or has "shifting main characters". James R. Hightower described the work as "amorphous and plotless".

However, more recent scholarship by Słupski detects organization in The Scholars on three levels. The first is the anecdotal level, in which the work can be divided into various "units" centered around a comical fact or occurrence. The second level is that of biography, in which the author constructs a multifaceted view of main characters in the work. An example is the portrayal of Zhou Jin, the elderly examination candidate. The final level is that of autobiography, the author's attitude toward the events of the story. This is revealed in chapter titles, poems, and occasional narrative interludes.

Chapter 37 depicts a ceremony honoring a legendary Confucian sage, Wu Taibo. Both modern and Qing dynasty commentators have noted that this chapter constitutes the "high point" and "structural apex" of the novel. The literary scholar Shang Wei believes that the chapter highlights Wu Jingzi's simultaneous desire to follow Confucian ritual and to critique it.

Stephen Roddy argues that the novel is divided into four sections, which correspond to successive eras of the Ming. The introductory chapters refer to the transition from the Yuan to the Ming, chapters 2–7 to the years up to 1517, chapters 21–35 the Jiajing reign, and chapter 55 the final years, the Wanli reign. The progression from civic activism to salon life in the novel, Roddy continues, is parallel to the withdrawal into scholastic dillentantism in the late reigns of the Ming.

== Influence ==
The Scholars is seen as one of the foremost Chinese satirical novels. It deeply influenced some of the most acclaimed Chinese novels of the late Qing period, such as Officialdom Unmasked, Bizarre Happenings Eyewitnessed over Two Decades, The Travels of Lao Can, A Flower in a Sinful Sea and Modern Times.

== Editions ==
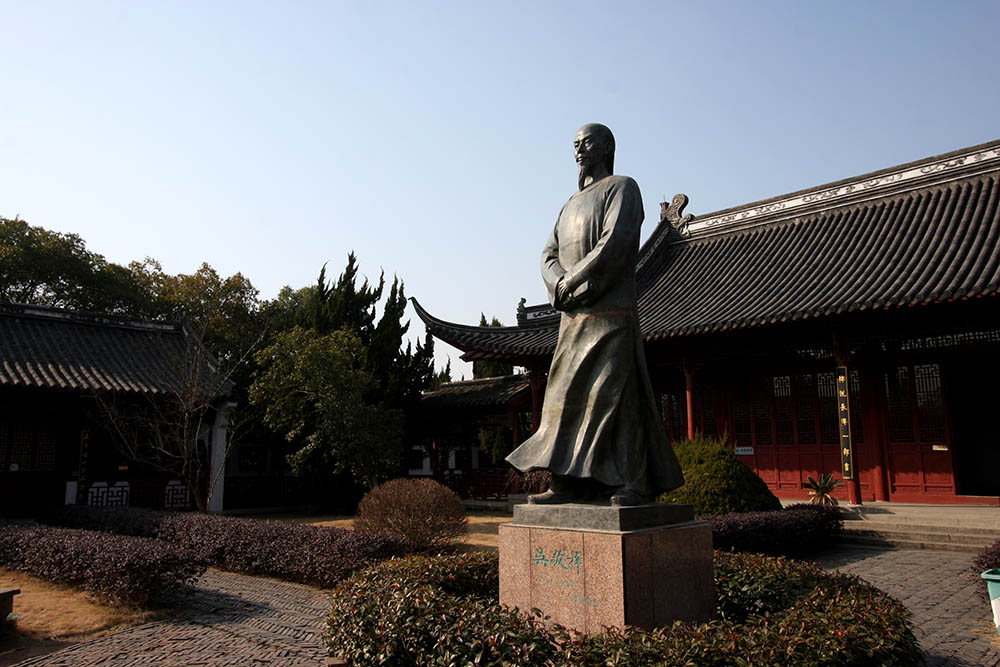
Statue of Wu Jingzi in Chuzhou

The earliest printed editions of the novel did not survive, and some critics have raised questions about the reliability of later printed editions. The earliest extant edition of The Scholars is the 1803 Wo Xian Caotang edition, commonly referred to as the "Wo" edition. This was followed in 1816 by the Qingjiang Pu Zhu Li Ge ("Qing") and Yi Gu Tang ("Yi") editions, which are both essentially copies of the Wo edition. The Suzhou Fan Shi Chao ("Chao") edition was the personal reading edition of a Qing official. While this edition was quite rare, the following Suzhou Qun Yu Ji ("Su") edition was quite popular, and there are many extant versions of it in circulation. The first Shen Bao Guan ("Shen One") edition corrected the mistakes of previous editions, and the second Shen Bao Guan edition ("Shen Two") carried these corrections further.

In addition to further corrections, the Ji edition greatly shortened the text, by for example deleting characters' titles. The Zeng Bu Ji Sheng Tang ("Zeng Bu Ji") edition added four additional chapters of text to the novel. The Commercial Press edition of the novel was arranged according to the Shen Two edition, and made further corrections to the text. The Yadong edition was first published in 1920, and reissued a number of times in subsequent years. The 16th edition was released in 1948. This version of the text has greatly influenced modern printings of the novel.

Various editions of The Scholars
An 1803 printed edition of The Scholars

A 1922 printed edition

A 1926 printed edition

A 1931 printed edition

A 1934 printed edition

A 1937 printed edition

A 1949 printed edition

A 1986 printed edition

Edition from the Peking University Library

== Translations ==
=== English ===
- The Scholars (tr. Yang Hsien-yi and Gladys Yang). Foreign Language Press, Peking: 1957. Reprinted by Columbia University Press, 1992. ISBN 0-231-08153-7 and Foreign Language Press, Beijing: 2004. ISBN 7-119-01213-4.

=== Other Languages ===
- Chronique indiscrète des mandarins tr. Tchang Fou-jouei, Préface by André Lévy, Paris, Gallimard, 1976 (ISBN 2-07-070746-6)
- Rúlín Wáishi: historia indiscreta del bosque de letrados. Beijing: Ediciones en Lenguas Extranjeras, 1993.
- Der Weg zu den weißen Wolken: Geschichten aus dem Gelehrtenwald (The Way to the White Clouds: Stories from the Forest of Scholars), tr. Yang Enlin and Gerhard Schmitt; Weimar, Germany : G. Kiepenheuer, 1962; rpr. with an afterword by Irma Peters, Leipzig 1989.
- (Russian) Неофициальная история конфуцианцев (Neoficial'naya istoriya konfuciancev). Translation, comments by D. Voskresensky. Moscow, 1959, reprints 1999, 2008.
- (Japanese) 儒林外史 (Jurin gaishi). tr. 稲田 (Takashi Inada). Tōkyō: Heibonsha, 1977.
- (Hungarian) Írástudók. tr. Péter Polonyi. Budapest, Európa, 1966.

== References and further reading ==
- Hsia, Chih-tsing (1968), "The Scholars", The Classic Chinese Novel: A Critical Introduction, New York: Columbia University Press, pp. 203–244; reprinted Bloomington: Indiana University Press, 1980 ISBN 9780253202581; Ithaca, New York, East Asia Program, 1996 ISBN 1885445741. ONLINE at Internet Archive.
- Pidhainy, Ihor (Winter 2006). "Teaching Wu Jingzi's The Scholars" (PDF). Education About Asia. 13 (3): 65–66.
- Roddy, Stephen (1998). "The Deconstruction of Literati Identity in Rulin Waishi". Literati Identity and Its Fictional Representations in Late Imperial China. Stanford, CA: Stanford University Press. ISBN 9780804731317.
- Paul S. Ropp, Dissent in Early Modern China: Ju-Lin Wai-Shih and Ch'ing Social Criticism (Ann Arbor: University of Michigan Press, 1981). ONLINE at InternetArchive.
- Shang Wei and Beiwen Yan. Li yu shiba shiji de wenhua zhuanzhe: "Ru Lin Wai Shi" Yanjiu. (Beijing Shi: Shenghuo, dushu, xin zhisan lian shudian, Beijing, 2012). ISBN 9787108041395.
- Shang, Wei (2003). Rulin Waishi and Cultural Transformation in Late Imperial China. Cambridge, Mass.: Harvard University Asia Center; Distributed by Harvard University Press. ISBN 0674010957.
- Wong, Timothy C. (1978), Wu Ching-tzu, Boston: Twayne Archived at InternetArchive.
