= Langya District =

Coordinates: 32°17′13″N 118°17′53″E

Langya 琅琊区
- District
- Interactive map of Langya
- Country: People's Republic of China
- Province: Anhui
- Prefecture-level city: Chuzhou

Area
  - Total: 180.79 km^{2} (69.80 sq mi)

Population (2019)
  - Total: 329,000
- Time zone: UTC+8 (China Standard)
- Postal code: 239000
- Website: http://xxgk.lyq.gov.cn/tmp/newxxgk.shtml

Langya District (simplified Chinese: 琅琊区; traditional Chinese: 瑯琊區; pinyin: Lángyá Qū) is a district of Anhui Province, China. It is under the administration of Chuzhou city.

== Administrative divisions ==
Langya District is divided to 8 subdistricts:

8 Subdistricts

- Yangzi Subdistrict (扬子街道)
- Qingliu Subdistrict (清流街道)
- Langya Subdistrict (琅琊街道)
- Dongmen Subdistrict (东门街道)
- Ximen Subdistrict (西门街道)
- Nanmen Subdistrict (南门街道)
- Beimen Subdistrict (北门街道)
- Xijian Subdistrict (西涧街道)
