= Quanjiao County =

Coordinates: 32°02′39″N 118°04′31″E

Quanjiao 全椒县 Chuantsiao
- County
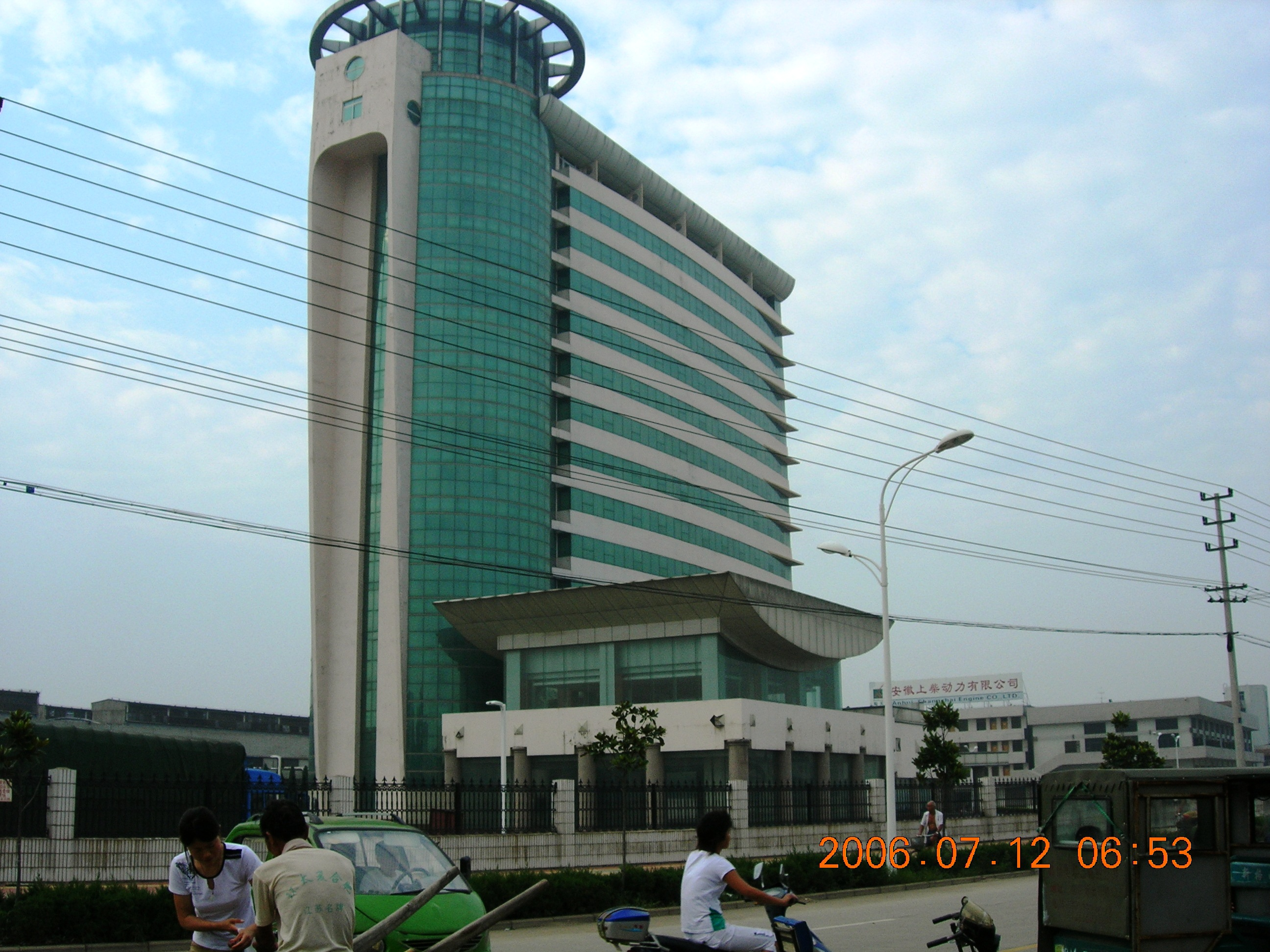
- Interactive map of Quanjiao
- Country: People's Republic of China
- Province: Anhui
- Prefecture-level city: Chuzhou

Area
  - Total: 1,568 km^{2} (605 sq mi)

Population (2019)
  - Total: 407,000
- Time zone: UTC+8 (China Standard)
- Postal code: 239500

Quanjiao County (Chinese: 全椒县; pinyin: Quánjiāo Xiàn) is a county in the east of Anhui Province, China, bordering Jiangsu province to the east. It is under the administration of Chuzhou city.

== Administrative divisions ==
Quanjiao County has 10 towns.

10 Towns

- Xianghe (襄河镇)
- Wugang (武岗镇)
- Shizi (十字镇)
- Liuzhen (六镇镇)
- Erlangkou (二郎口镇)
- Xiwang (西王镇)
- Machang (马厂镇)
- Dashu (大墅镇)
- Shipei (石沛镇)
- Guhe (古河镇)

== Climate ==
Climate data for Quanjiao, elevation 27 m (89 ft), (1991–2020 normals, extremes 1991–present)
Month	Jan	Feb	Mar	Apr	May	Jun	Jul	Aug	Sep	Oct	Nov	Dec	Year
Record high °C (°F)	21.8 (71.2)	27.8 (82.0)	29.8 (85.6)	34.5 (94.1)	36.7 (98.1)	37.7 (99.9)	40.5 (104.9)	40.5 (104.9)	38.4 (101.1)	34.2 (93.6)	29.2 (84.6)	23.1 (73.6)	40.5 (104.9)
Mean daily maximum °C (°F)	7.2 (45.0)	10.1 (50.2)	15.3 (59.5)	21.8 (71.2)	26.9 (80.4)	29.5 (85.1)	32.5 (90.5)	32.0 (89.6)	28.0 (82.4)	22.9 (73.2)	16.5 (61.7)	9.8 (49.6)	21.0 (69.9)
Daily mean °C (°F)	2.9 (37.2)	5.4 (41.7)	10.1 (50.2)	16.3 (61.3)	21.7 (71.1)	25.2 (77.4)	28.3 (82.9)	27.7 (81.9)	23.4 (74.1)	17.8 (64.0)	11.4 (52.5)	5.1 (41.2)	16.3 (61.3)
Mean daily minimum °C (°F)	−0.3 (31.5)	1.8 (35.2)	6.0 (42.8)	11.7 (53.1)	17.3 (63.1)	21.6 (70.9)	25.2 (77.4)	24.6 (76.3)	20.0 (68.0)	13.9 (57.0)	7.5 (45.5)	1.5 (34.7)	12.6 (54.6)
Record low °C (°F)	−10.4 (13.3)	−9.1 (15.6)	−3.3 (26.1)	1.0 (33.8)	7.8 (46.0)	14.9 (58.8)	17.8 (64.0)	16.1 (61.0)	—	4.2 (39.6)	−5.3 (22.5)	−12.7 (9.1)	−12.7 (9.1)
Average precipitation mm (inches)	47.3 (1.86)	51.3 (2.02)	75.1 (2.96)	73.1 (2.88)	85.1 (3.35)	183.2 (7.21)	204.2 (8.04)	159.1 (6.26)	74.3 (2.93)	57.2 (2.25)	54.9 (2.16)	33.5 (1.32)	1,098.3 (43.24)
Average precipitation days (≥ 0.1 mm)	9.0	9.1	10.4	9.4	9.7	10.2	12.1	11.8	8.1	7.8	8.3	7.1	113
Average snowy days	3.9	2.6	1.2	0	0	0	0	0	0	0	0.5	1.3	9.5
Average relative humidity (%)	74	72	70	68	69	76	80	80	77	73	73	72	74
Mean monthly sunshine hours	118.9	120.7	144.2	169.3	179.4	149.5	177.3	181.1	150.9	156.8	141.0	133.5	1,822.6
Percentage possible sunshine	37	39	39	43	42	35	41	44	41	45	45	43	41
Source: China Meteorological Administration all-time January high
