= Chuzhou railway station =

Railway station in China

Chuzhou 滁州
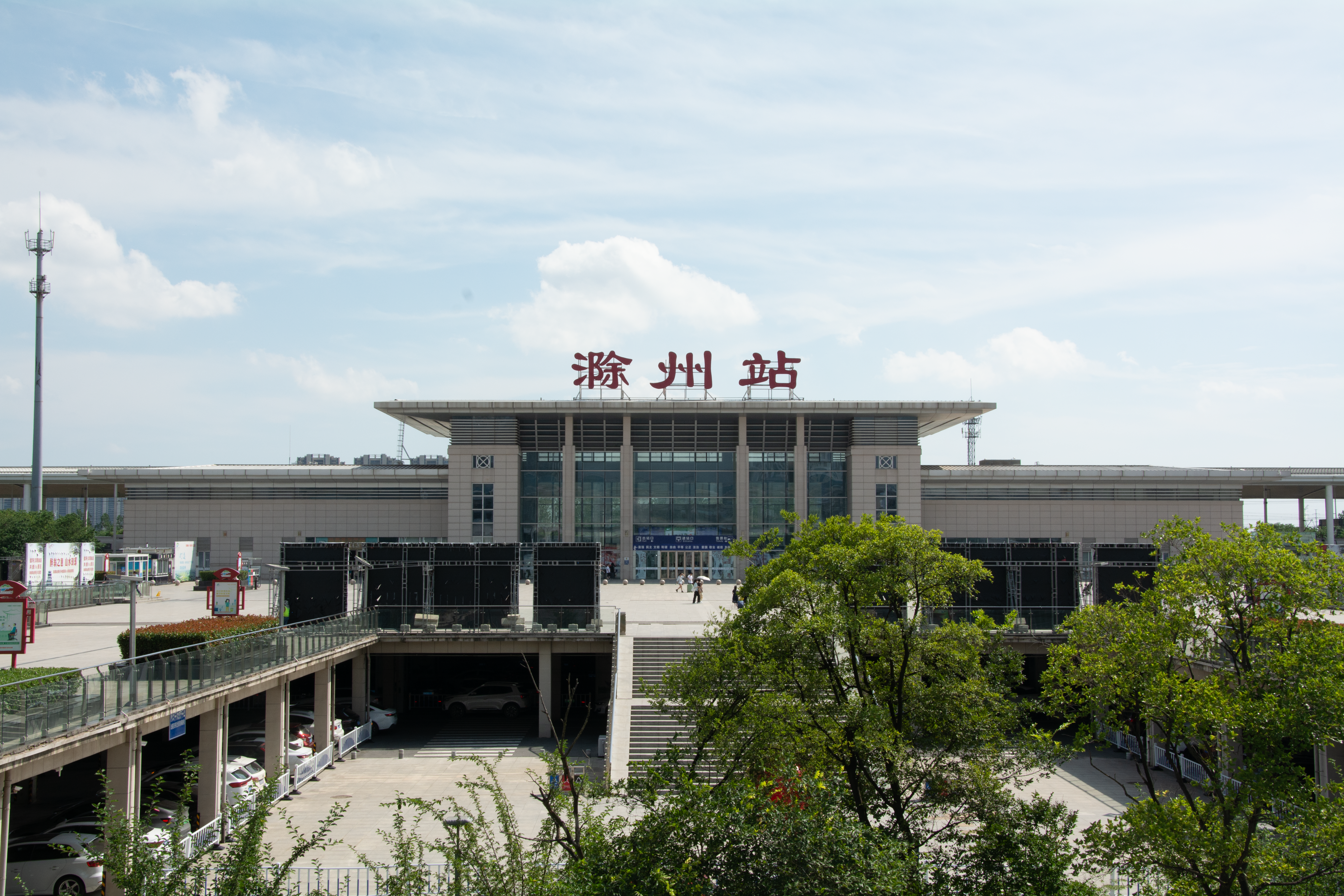

General information
- Location: Nanqiao District, Chuzhou, Anhui; China
- Coordinates: 32.199565°N 118.314621°E
- Operated by: Shanghai Railway Bureau; China Railway Corporation
- Line(s): Jinghu High-Speed Railway

Other information
- Station code: TMIS code: 66839; Telegraph code: CXH; Pinyin code: CZH
- Classification: 2nd class station

History
- Opened: June 30, 2011

Chuzhou railway station (Chinese: 滁州站; pinyin: Chúzhōu Zhàn) is a high-speed railway station in Nanqiao District, Chuzhou, Anhui, People's Republic of China. It is served by the Jinghu High-Speed Railway.

== See also ==
- Chuzhou North railway station

Preceding station	China Railway High-speed	Following station
Dingyuan towards Beijing South or Tianjin West	Beijing–Shanghai high-speed railway	Nanjing South towards Shanghai Hongqiao
