= Lai'an County =

Coordinates: 32°29′33″N 118°28′06″E

Lai'an 来安县 Laian
- County
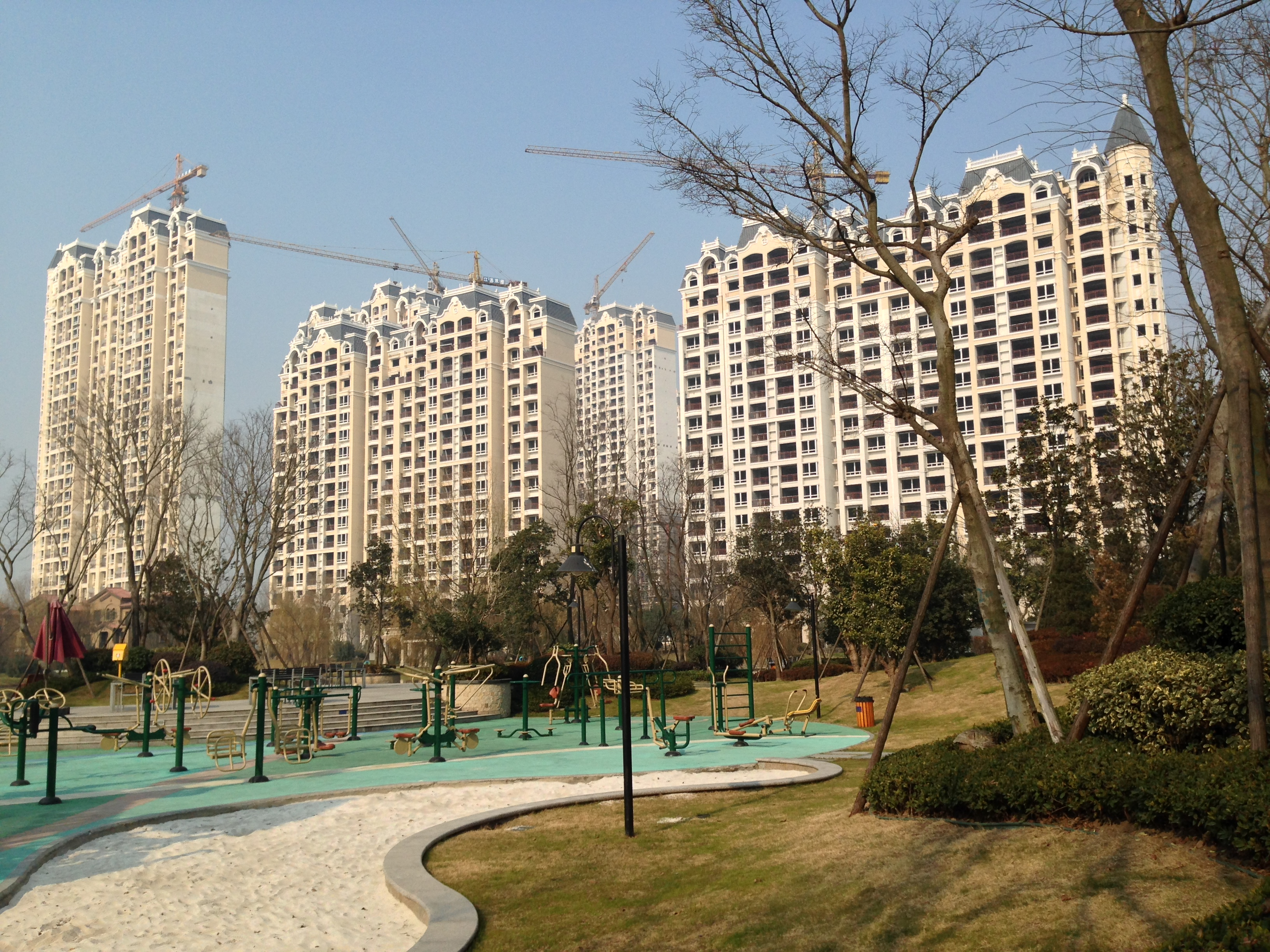
- Interactive map of Lai'an
- Country: People's Republic of China
- Province: Anhui
- Prefecture-level city: Chuzhou

Area
  - Total: 1,481 km^{2} (572 sq mi)

Population (2019)
  - Total: 452,000
- Time zone: UTC+8 (China Standard)
- Postal code: 239200
- Website: www.laian.gov.cn

Lai'an County (simplified Chinese: 来安县; traditional Chinese: 來安縣; pinyin: Lái'ān Xiàn) is a county in the east of Anhui Province, China, lying between the Yangtze River and the Huai River. It is under the administration of Chuzhou city.

== Administrative divisions ==
Lai'an County has 8 towns and 4 townships.

8 Towns

- Xin'an (新安镇)
- Chahe (汊河镇)
- Banta (半塔镇)
- Shuikou (水口镇)
- Shunshan (舜山镇)
- Leiguan (雷官镇)
- Shiguan (施官镇)
- Daying (大英镇)

4 Townships

- Yangying Township (杨郢乡)
- Zhangshan Township (张山乡)
- Dushan Township (独山乡)
- Sancheng Township (三城乡)

== Climate ==
Climate data for Lai'an, elevation 40 m (130 ft), (1991–2020 normals, extremes 1981–present)
Month	Jan	Feb	Mar	Apr	May	Jun	Jul	Aug	Sep	Oct	Nov	Dec	Year
Record high °C (°F)	21.2 (70.2)	26.9 (80.4)	28.9 (84.0)	32.7 (90.9)	37.1 (98.8)	37.1 (98.8)	39.3 (102.7)	38.9 (102.0)	38.7 (101.7)	34.1 (93.4)	28.4 (83.1)	23.5 (74.3)	39.3 (102.7)
Mean daily maximum °C (°F)	6.8 (44.2)	9.6 (49.3)	14.8 (58.6)	21.3 (70.3)	26.5 (79.7)	29.2 (84.6)	32.0 (89.6)	31.5 (88.7)	27.6 (81.7)	22.6 (72.7)	16.1 (61.0)	9.4 (48.9)	20.6 (69.1)
Daily mean °C (°F)	2.2 (36.0)	4.8 (40.6)	9.6 (49.3)	15.8 (60.4)	21.3 (70.3)	24.9 (76.8)	27.9 (82.2)	27.2 (81.0)	22.9 (73.2)	17.3 (63.1)	10.7 (51.3)	4.4 (39.9)	15.8 (60.3)
Mean daily minimum °C (°F)	−1.1 (30.0)	1.1 (34.0)	5.2 (41.4)	11.0 (51.8)	16.6 (61.9)	21.2 (70.2)	24.7 (76.5)	24.1 (75.4)	19.3 (66.7)	13.2 (55.8)	6.6 (43.9)	0.7 (33.3)	11.9 (53.4)
Record low °C (°F)	−10.8 (12.6)	−12.8 (9.0)	−6.2 (20.8)	−1.0 (30.2)	6.2 (43.2)	12.4 (54.3)	17.3 (63.1)	15.4 (59.7)	10.4 (50.7)	1.2 (34.2)	−5.8 (21.6)	−15.0 (5.0)	−15.0 (5.0)
Average precipitation mm (inches)	41.0 (1.61)	43.8 (1.72)	70.1 (2.76)	69.4 (2.73)	79.0 (3.11)	157.7 (6.21)	199.2 (7.84)	157.8 (6.21)	71.6 (2.82)	55.3 (2.18)	53.6 (2.11)	30.2 (1.19)	1,028.7 (40.49)
Average precipitation days (≥ 0.1 mm)	8.1	8.6	9.7	8.6	9.4	10.3	12.6	11.9	8.2	7.4	7.7	6.5	109
Average snowy days	4.3	2.8	1.2	0.1	0	0	0	0	0	0	0.5	1.5	10.4
Average relative humidity (%)	74	73	71	70	71	78	83	83	80	75	75	74	76
Mean monthly sunshine hours	138.0	134.3	165.9	194.1	203.5	173.3	199.8	207.2	174.4	178.4	159.6	148.4	2,076.9
Percentage possible sunshine	43	43	45	50	47	41	46	51	47	51	51	48	47
Source: China Meteorological Administration all-time January high
