= Nanqiao District =

Coordinates: 32°18′29″N 118°17′36″E

Nanqiao 南谯区
- District
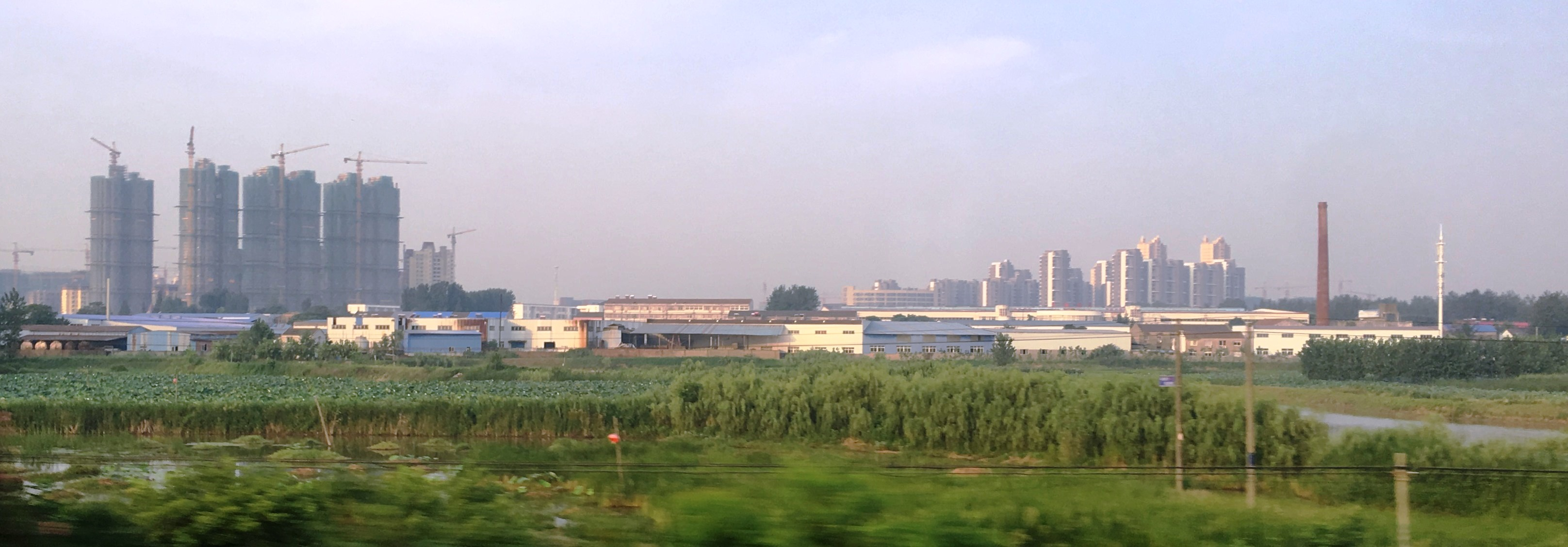
- Interactive map of Nanqiao
- Country: People's Republic of China
- Province: Anhui
- Prefecture-level city: Chuzhou

Area
  - Total: 1,187.11 km^{2} (458.35 sq mi)

Population (2019)
  - Total: 269,000
- Time zone: UTC+8 (China Standard)
- Postal code: 239001

Nanqiao District (simplified Chinese: 南谯区; traditional Chinese: 南譙區; pinyin: Nánqiáo Qū) is a district of the prefecture-level city of Chuzhou in Anhui Province, China.

== Administrative divisions ==
Nanqiao District has 1 subdistrict and 8 towns.

1 Subdistrict

- Dawang Subdistrict (大王街道)

8 Towns

- Wuyi (乌衣镇)
- Shahe (沙河镇)
- Zhangguang (章广镇)
- Nannigang (南泥岗镇)
- Daliu (大柳镇)
- Yaopu (腰铺镇)
- Zhulong (珠龙镇)
- Shiji (施集镇)
