= Chuzhou =

Chuzhou 滁州市
- Prefecture-level city
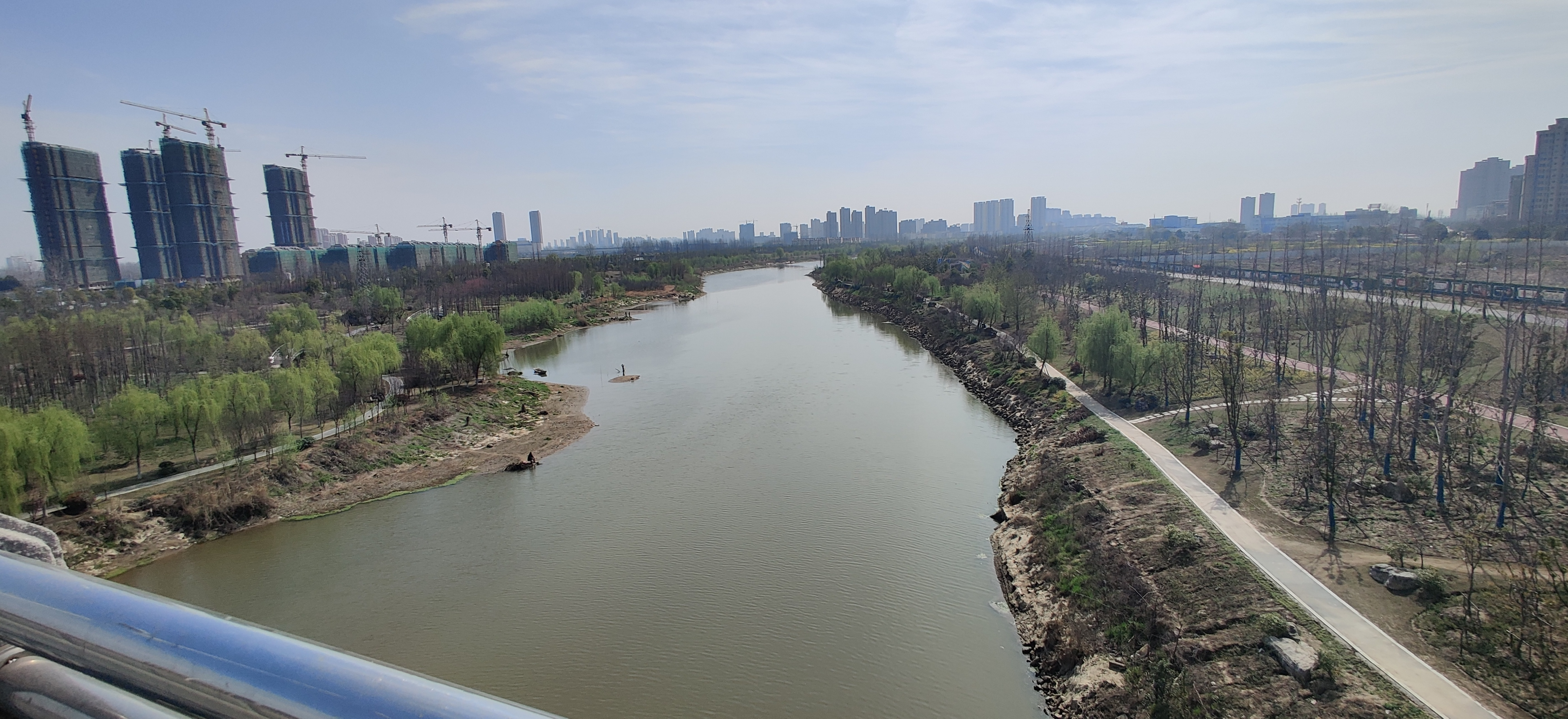
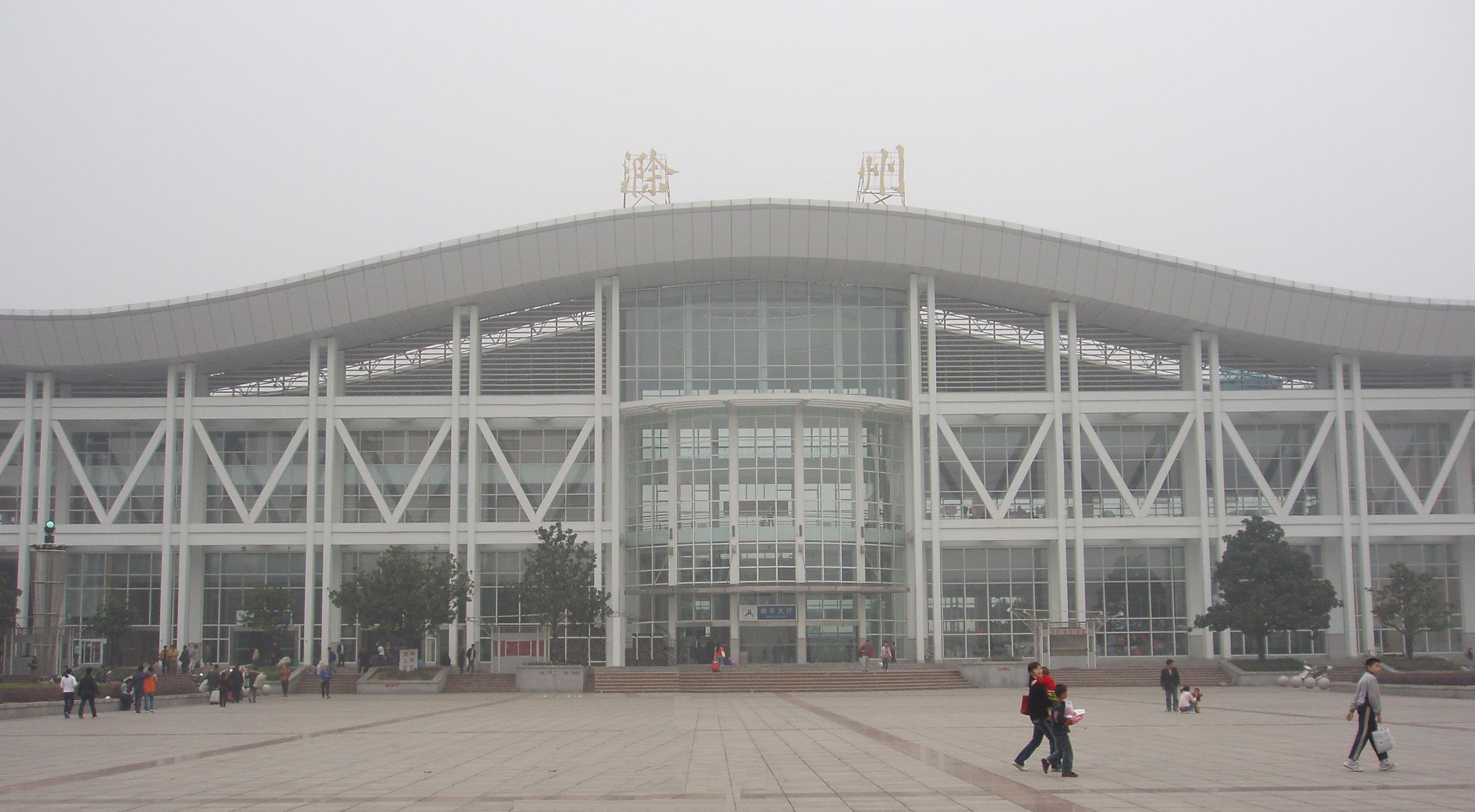
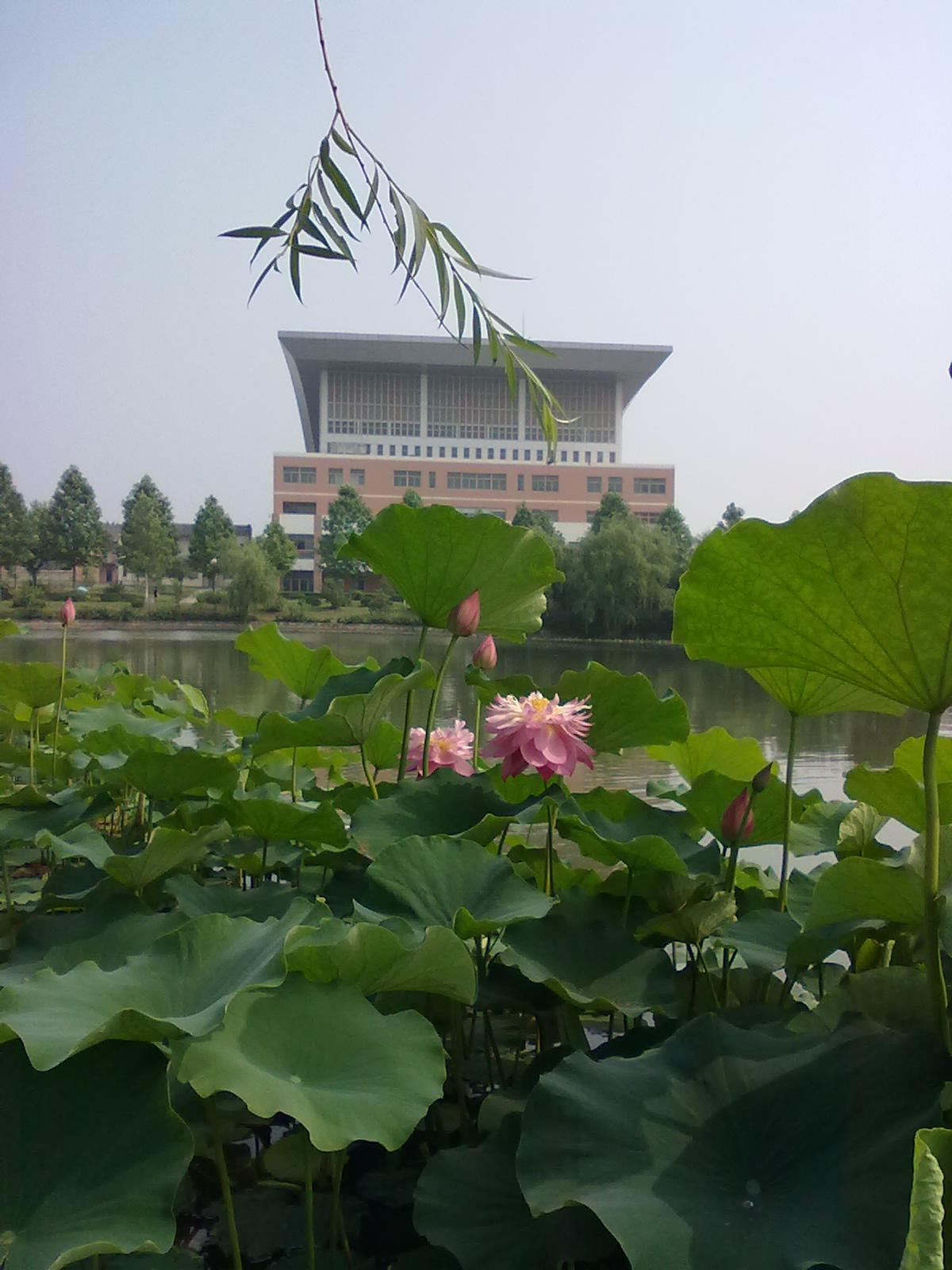
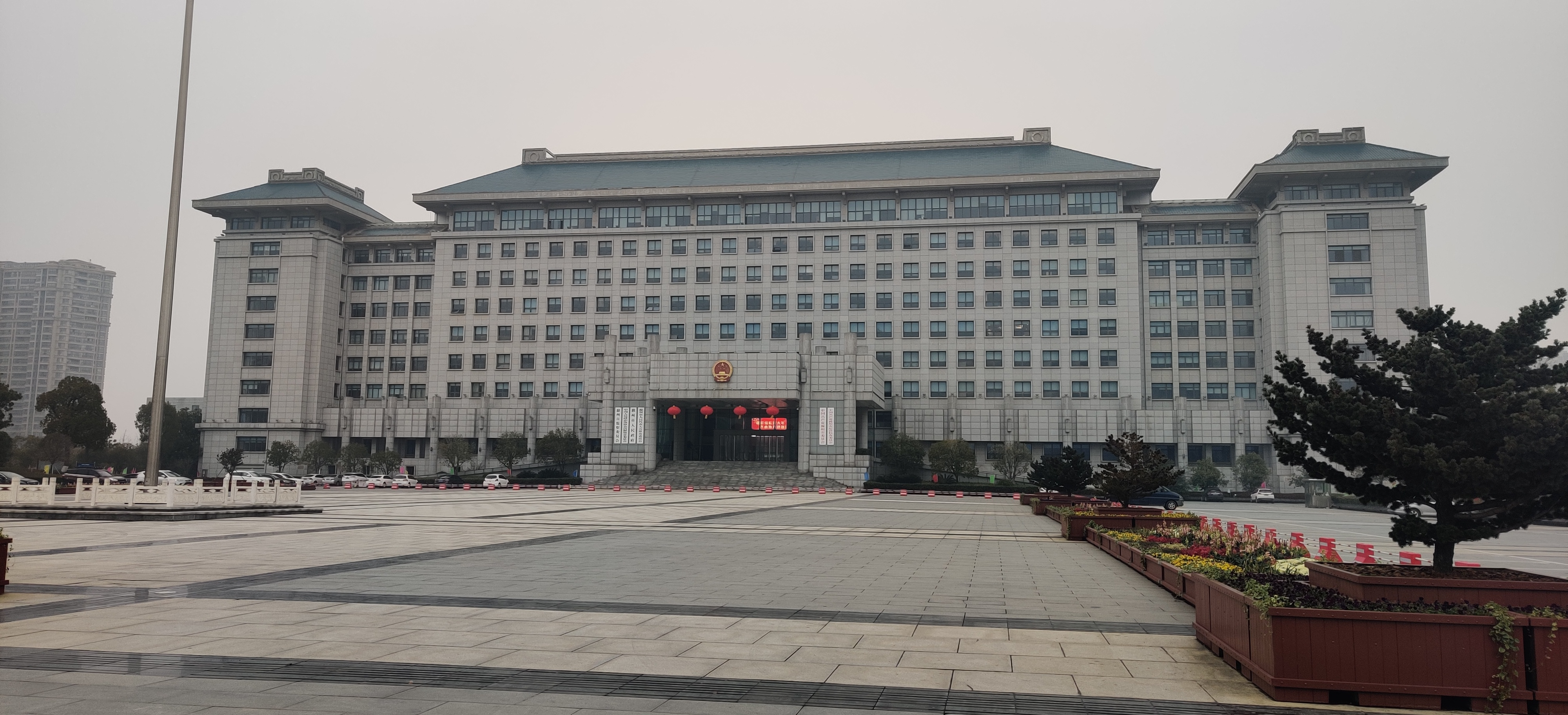
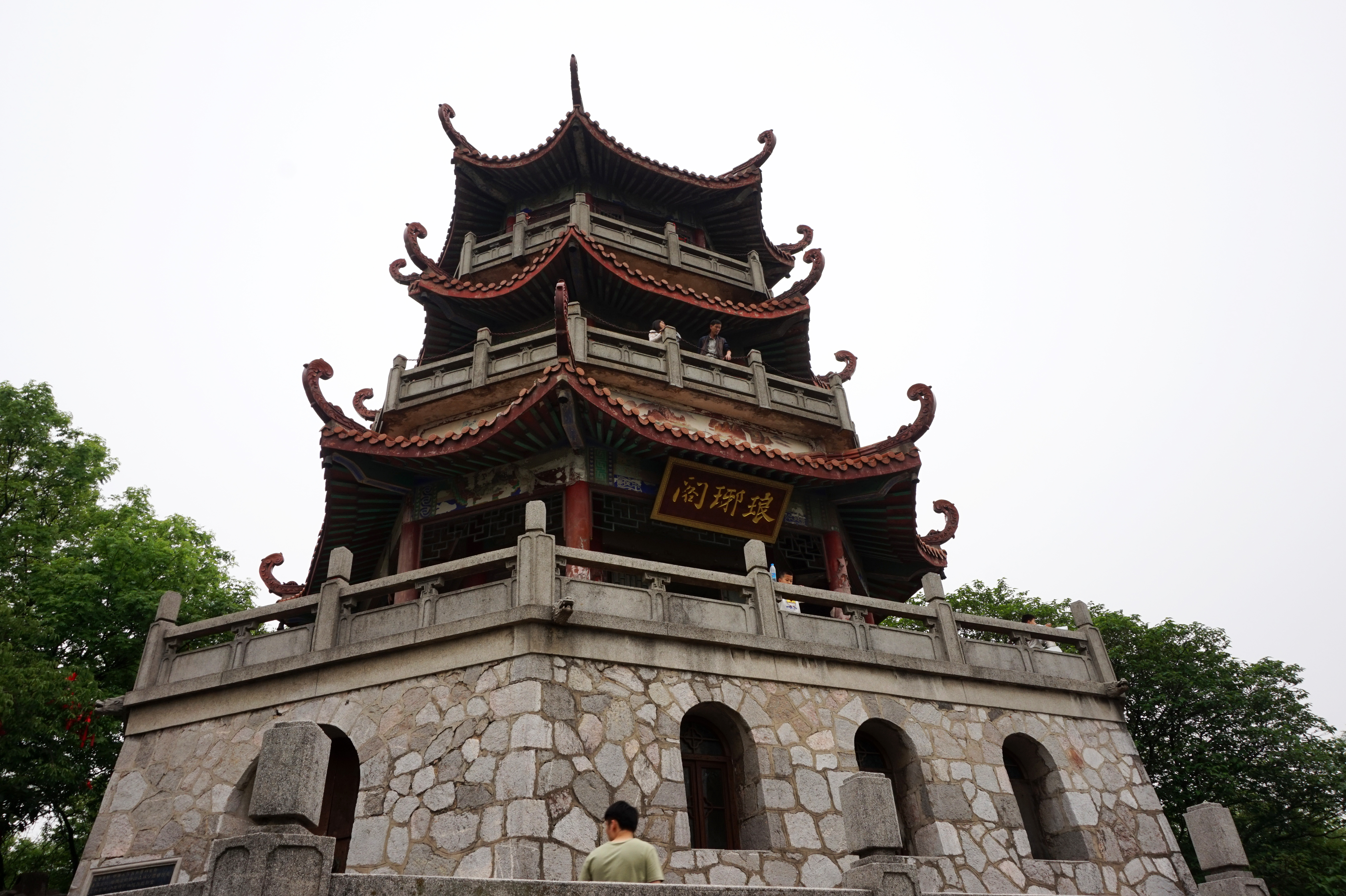
- Clockwise from top: Chuzhou seen from Qingliuhe Park, Chuzhou University, a pavilion on Mount Langya, the Municipal Government building, and the Chuzhou railway station.

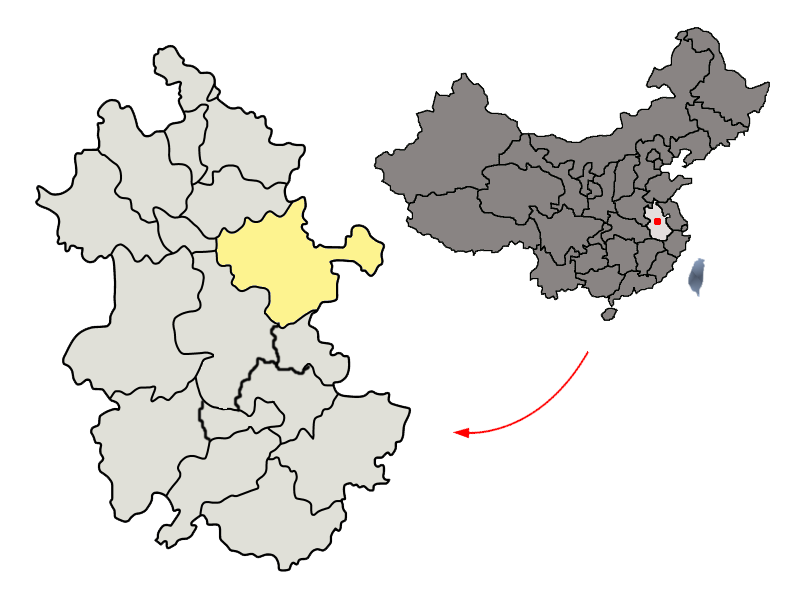
- Location of Chuzhou City jurisdiction in Anhui
- Coordinates (Chuzhou government): 32°15′22″N 118°19′59″E
- Country: People's Republic of China
- Province: Anhui
- County-level divisions: 8
- Township-level divisions: 178
- Municipal seat: Langya District

Government
  - Mayor: Zhang Xiang'an (张祥安)

Area
  - Prefecture-level city: 13,523.21 km^{2} (5,221.34 sq mi)
  - Urban: 1,404.3 km^{2} (542.2 sq mi)
  - Metro: 2,903 km^{2} (1,121 sq mi)

Population (2020 census)
  - Prefecture-level city: 3,937,868
  - Density: 291.1933/km^{2} (754.1872/sq mi)
  - Urban: 782,671
  - Urban density: 557.34/km^{2} (1,443.5/sq mi)
  - Metro: 1,198,719
  - Metro density: 412.9/km^{2} (1,069/sq mi)

GDP
  - Prefecture-level city: CN¥ 336.2 billion US$ 42.7 billion
  - Per capita: CN¥ 84,263; US$ 13,062
- Time zone: UTC+8 (CST)
- Postal code: 239000
- Area code: 0550
- ISO 3166 code: CN-AH-11
- License Plate Prefix: 皖M

Chuzhou (Chinese: 滁州; pinyin: Chúzhōu) is a prefecture-level city in eastern Anhui Province, China. It borders the provincial capital of Hefei to the south and southwest, Huainan to the west, Bengbu to the northwest, and the province of Jiangsu to the east. According to the 2010 Chinese census, the city of Chuzhou has a registered population of 3,987,054 inhabitants, of whom 1,198,719 live in the built-up (or metro) area made of two urban districts, with Lai'an County now largely being urbanized. Nevertheless, 7,260,240 persons declared to be permanent residents.

== Climate ==
Chuzhou has a monsoon-influenced, humid subtropical climate (Köppen Cfa), with four distinct seasons. Winters are cold and damp, with average low temperatures in January dipping just below freezing; the January 24-hour average temperature is 2.6 °C (36.7 °F). Summers are typically hot and humid, with a July average of 27.6 °C (81.7 °F). The annual mean is 15.9 °C (60.6 °F), while annual precipitation averages 1,074.7 millimetres (42 in), a majority of which occurs from May to August.

Climate data for Chuzhou, elevation 34 m (112 ft), (1991–2020 normals, extremes 1971–present)
Month	Jan	Feb	Mar	Apr	May	Jun	Jul	Aug	Sep	Oct	Nov	Dec	Year
Record high °C (°F)	21.6 (70.9)	27.7 (81.9)	33.6 (92.5)	33.9 (93.0)	36.0 (96.8)	37.6 (99.7)	39.5 (103.1)	39.5 (103.1)	38.6 (101.5)	34.3 (93.7)	29.0 (84.2)	23.7 (74.7)	39.5 (103.1)
Mean daily maximum °C (°F)	7.0 (44.6)	9.8 (49.6)	15.0 (59.0)	21.5 (70.7)	26.7 (80.1)	29.3 (84.7)	32.1 (89.8)	31.6 (88.9)	27.7 (81.9)	22.7 (72.9)	16.2 (61.2)	9.6 (49.3)	20.8 (69.4)
Daily mean °C (°F)	2.6 (36.7)	5.2 (41.4)	10.0 (50.0)	16.2 (61.2)	21.6 (70.9)	25.0 (77.0)	28.1 (82.6)	27.4 (81.3)	23.2 (73.8)	17.5 (63.5)	11.1 (52.0)	4.9 (40.8)	16.1 (60.9)
Mean daily minimum °C (°F)	−0.6 (30.9)	1.6 (34.9)	5.8 (42.4)	11.5 (52.7)	17.1 (62.8)	21.3 (70.3)	24.9 (76.8)	24.4 (75.9)	19.7 (67.5)	13.6 (56.5)	7.1 (44.8)	1.3 (34.3)	12.3 (54.2)
Record low °C (°F)	−13.0 (8.6)	−11.8 (10.8)	−5.7 (21.7)	0.2 (32.4)	6.9 (44.4)	12.7 (54.9)	17.1 (62.8)	15.7 (60.3)	9.1 (48.4)	1.5 (34.7)	−6.7 (19.9)	−12.3 (9.9)	−13.0 (8.6)
Average precipitation mm (inches)	45.9 (1.81)	46.9 (1.85)	74.0 (2.91)	71.5 (2.81)	82.3 (3.24)	165.2 (6.50)	221.1 (8.70)	171.5 (6.75)	76.0 (2.99)	50.6 (1.99)	55.6 (2.19)	33.2 (1.31)	1,093.8 (43.05)
Average precipitation days (≥ 0.1 mm)	8.2	8.6	9.9	8.6	9.6	10.1	13.2	12.3	8.0	7.6	7.9	6.5	110.5
Average snowy days	4.1	2.7	1.0	0.1	0	0	0	0	0	0	0.5	1.4	9.8
Average relative humidity (%)	74	73	70	68	70	76	81	82	79	74	74	72	74
Mean monthly sunshine hours	116.0	114.5	144.7	172.5	177.3	139.3	172.2	172.6	146.9	153.9	136.8	129.2	1,775.9
Percentage possible sunshine	36	37	39	44	41	33	40	42	40	44	44	42	40
Source 1: China Meteorological Administration all-time January high
Source 2: Weather China

== Administration ==
The prefecture-level city of Chuzhou administers eight county-level divisions, including two districts, a sub-prefecture-level city (Tianchang), a county-level city and four counties. The population information here presented uses 2010 census data of permanent residents.

Map
Name	Simplified Chinese	Hanyu Pinyin	Area (km^{2})	Population	Density (/km^{2})
Districts
Langya District	琅琊区	Lángyá Qū	181	310,427	1,715
Nanqiao District	南谯区	Nánqiáo Qū	1,187	251,894	212
County-level Cities
Tianchang City	天长市	Tiāncháng Shì	1,770	602,840	341
Mingguang City	明光市	Míngguāng Shì	2,335	532,732	228
Counties
Lai'an County	来安县	Lái'ān Xiàn	1,481	432,021	292
Quanjiao County	全椒县	Quánjiāo Xiàn	1,572	383,885	244
Dingyuan County	定远县	Dìngyuǎn Xiàn	2,998	779,174	260
Fengyang County	凤阳县	Fèngyáng Xiàn	1,950	644,895	331

These are further divided into 178 township-level divisions, including 86 towns, 78 townships and 14 subdistricts.

== Transport ==
=== China Railway ===
- Chuzhou railway station
- Chuzhou North railway station

=== Metro ===
- Line S4 of the Nanjing Metro connects Chuzhou railway station with Lai'an County.

== Tourism ==
Mount Langya in Chuzhou is a National Forest Park, National Scenic Area and 4A Tourism Attraction, the mountain is one of Anhui's five biggest scenic attractions.

== Education ==
- Chuzhou University (CZHU, 滁州学院)
- Chuzhou Radio and TV University

== Notable people ==
- Lu Su (172–217), military general and politician serving under the warlord Sun Quan during the late Eastern Han dynasty.
- Zhu Yuanzhang (1328–1398), founding emperor of the Ming dynasty
- Wu Jingzi (1701–1754), Qing dynasty writer, author of the satirical novel The Scholars
- Lu Yuanjiu (born 1920), physicist
- Jiang Shan (born 1962), former Communist Party secretary of the city, dismissed for corruption
- Qiu Jianliang, professional kickboxer
- Ouyang Feng, sanshou fighter and professional kickboxer
