= East China administrative division codes of the PRC (Division 3) =

List of administrative division codes of the PRC in Division 3 or East China.

== Shanghai (31) ==
310000	Shanghai municipality 上海市								
310100	District 市辖区	310101	Huangpu 黄浦区	310102	~~Nanshi~~ 南市区	310103	~~Luwan~~ 卢湾区	310104	Xuhui 徐汇区
310100	District 市辖区	310105	Changning 长宁区	310106	Jing'an 静安区	310107	Putuo 普陀区	310108	~~Zhabei~~ 闸北区
310100	District 市辖区	310109	Hongkou 虹口区	310110	Yangpu 杨浦区	310111	~~Wusong~~ 吴淞区	310112	Minhang 闵行区
310100	District 市辖区	310113	Baoshan 宝山区	310114	Jiading 嘉定区	310115	Pudong 浦东新区	310116	Jinshan 金山区
310100	District 市辖区	310117	Songjiang 松江区	310118	Qingpu 青浦区	310119	~~Nanhui~~ 南汇区	310120	Fengxian 奉贤区
310100	District 市辖区	310151	Chongming 崇明区						
310220	~~County~~ 县	310221	~~Shanghai Co.~~ 上海县	310222	~~Jiading Co.~~ 嘉定县	310223	~~Baoshan Co.~~ 宝山县	310224	~~Chuansha Co.~~ 川沙县
310220	~~County~~ 县	310225	~~Nanhui Co.~~ 南汇县	310226	~~Fengxian Co.~~ 奉贤县	310227	~~Songjiang Co.~~ 松江县	310228	~~Jinshan Co.~~ 金山县
310220	~~County~~ 县	310229	~~Qingpu Co.~~ 青浦县	310230	~~Chongming Co.~~ 崇明县				

== Jiangsu (32) ==
320000	Jiangsu Province 江苏省								
320100	Nanjing city 南京市								
320101	District 市辖区	320102	Xuanwu 玄武区	320103	~~Baixia~~ 白下区	320104	Qinhuai 秦淮区	320105	Jianye 建邺区
320101	District 市辖区	320106	Gulou 鼓楼区	320107	~~Xiaguan~~ 下关区				
320101	District 市辖区			320111	Pukou 浦口区	320112	~~Dachang~~ 大厂区	320113	Qixia 栖霞区
320101	District 市辖区	320114	Yuhuatai 雨花台区	320115	Jiangning 江宁区	320116	Luhe 六合区	320117	Lishui 溧水区
320101	District 市辖区	320118	Gaochun 高淳区			320120	~~Shi~~ 市区		
320121	~~Jiangning Co.~~ 江宁县	320122	~~Jiangpu Co.~~ 江浦县	320123	~~Luhe Co.~~ 六合县	320124	~~Lishui Co.~~ 溧水县	320125	~~Gaochun Co.~~ 高淳县
320200	Wuxi city 无锡市								
320201	District 市辖区	320202	~~Chong'an~~ 崇安区	320203	~~Nanchang~~ 南长区	320204	~~Beitang~~ 北塘区	320205	Xishan 锡山区
320201	District 市辖区	320206	Huishan 惠山区						
320201	District 市辖区			320211	Binhu 滨湖区	320212	~~Mashan~~ 马山区	320213	Liangxi 梁溪区
320201	District 市辖区	320214	Xinwu 新吴区						
320221	~~Jiangyin Co.~~ 江阴县	320222	~~Wuxi Co.~~ 无锡县	320222	~~Yixing Co.~~ 宜兴县				
320281	Jiangyin city 江阴市	320282	Yixing city 宜兴市	320283	~~Xishan city~~ 锡山市				
320300	Xuzhou city 徐州市								
320301	District 市辖区	320302	Gulou 鼓楼区	320303	Yunlong 云龙区	320304	~~Jiuli~~ 九里区	320305	Jiawang 贾汪区
320301	District 市辖区			320311	Quanshan 泉山区	320312	Tongshan 铜山区		
320321	Feng Co. 丰县	320321	Pei Co. 沛县	320323	~~Tongshan Co.~~ 铜山县	320324	Suining Co. 睢宁县	320325	~~Pi Co.~~ 邳县
320326	~~Xinyi Co.~~ 新沂县								
320381	Xinyi city 新沂市	320382	Pizhou city 邳州市						
320400	Changzhou city 常州市								
320401	District 市辖区	320402	Tianning 天宁区	320403	~~Guanghua~~ 广化区	320404	Zhonglou 钟楼区	320405	~~Qishuyan~~ 戚墅堰区
320401	District 市辖区			320411	Xinbei 新北区	320412	Wujin 武进区	320413	Jintan 金坛区
320421	~~Wujin Co.~~ 武进县	320422	~~Jintan Co.~~ 金坛县	320423	~~Liyang Co.~~ 溧阳县				
320481	Liyang city 溧阳市	320482	~~Jintan city~~ 金坛市	320483	~~Wujin city~~ 武进市				
320500	Suzhou city 苏州市								
320501	District 市辖区	320502	~~Canglang~~ 沧浪区	320503	~~Pingjiang~~ 平江区	320504	~~Jinchang~~ 金阊区	320505	Huqiu 虎丘区
320501	District 市辖区	320506	Wuzhong 吴中区	320507	Xiangcheng 相城区	320508	Gusu 姑苏区	320509	Wujiang 吴江区
320501	District 市辖区			320511	~~Jiao~~ 郊区				
						320520	~~Changshu city~~ 常熟市		
320521	~~Shazhou Co.~~ 沙洲县	320522	~~Taicang Co.~~ 太仓县	320523	~~Kunshan Co.~~ 昆山县	320524	~~Wu Co.~~ 吴县	320525	~~Wujiang Co.~~ 吴江县
320581	Changshu city 常熟市	320582	Zhangjiagang city 张家港市	320583	Kunshan city 昆山市	320584	~~Wujiang city~~ 吴江市	320585	Taicang city 太仓市
320586	~~Wuxian city~~ 吴县市								
320600	Nantong city 南通市								
320601	District 市辖区	320602	Chongchuan 崇川区						
320601	District 市辖区			320611	Gangzha 港闸区	320612	Tongzhou 通州区		
320621	Hai'an Co. 海安县	320622	~~Rugao Co.~~ 如皋县	320623	Rudong Co. 如东县	320624	~~Nantong Co.~~ 南通县	320625	~~Haimen Co.~~ 海门县
320626	~~Qidong Co.~~ 启东县								
320681	Qidong city 启东市	320682	Rugao city 如皋市	320683	~~Tongzhou city~~ 通州市	320684	Haimen city 海门市	320685	Hai'an city 海安市
320700	Lianyungang city 连云港市								
320701	District 市辖区	320702	~~Xinhai~~ 新海区	320703	Lianyun 连云区	320704	~~Yuntai~~ 云台区	320705	~~Xinpu~~ 新浦区
320701	District 市辖区	320706	Haizhou 海州区	320707	Ganyu 赣榆区				
320721	~~Ganyu Co.~~ 赣榆县	320722	Donghai Co. 东海县	320723	Guanyun Co. 灌云县	320724	Guannan Co. 灌南县		
320800	Huai'an city 淮安市								
320801	District 市辖区	320802	~~Qinghe~~ 清河区	320803	Huai'an 淮安区	320804	Huaiyin 淮阴区		
320801	District 市辖区			320811	~~Qingpu~~ 清浦区	320812	Qingjiangpu 清江浦区	320813	Hongze 洪泽区
320821	~~Huaiyin Co.~~ 淮阴县	320822	~~Guannan Co.~~ 灌南县	320623	~~Shuyang Co.~~ 沭阳县	320824	~~Suqian Co.~~ 宿迁县	320825	~~Siyang Co.~~ 泗阳县
320826	Lianshui Co. 涟水县	320827	~~Sihong Co.~~ 泗洪县	320628	~~Huai'an Co.~~ 淮安县	320829	~~Hongze Co.~~ 洪泽县	320830	Xuyi Co. 盱眙县
320831	Jinhu Co. 金湖县								
320681	~~Suqian city~~ 宿迁市	320682	~~Huai'an city~~ 淮安市						
320900	Yancheng city 盐城市								
320901	District 市辖区	320902	Tinghu 亭湖区	320903	Yandu 盐都区	320904	Dafeng 大丰区		
320901	District 市辖区			320911	~~Jiao~~ 郊区				
320921	Xiangshui Co. 响水县	320922	Binhai Co. 滨海县	320923	Funing Co. 阜宁县	320924	Sheyang Co. 射阳县	320925	Jianhu Co. 建湖县
320926	~~Dafeng Co.~~ 大丰县	320927	~~Dongtai Co.~~ 东台县	320928	~~Yandu Co.~~ 盐都县				
320981	Dongtai city 东台市	320982	~~Dafeng city~~ 大丰市						
321000	Yangzhou city 扬州市								
321001	District 市辖区	321002	Guangling 广陵区	321003	Hanjiang 邗江区				
321001	District 市辖区			321011	~~Weiyang~~ 维扬区	321012	Jiangdu 江都区		
				321019	~~Yizheng city~~ 仪征市	321020	~~Taizhou city~~ 泰州市		
321021	~~Xinghua Co.~~ 兴化县	321022	~~Gaoyou Co.~~ 高邮县	320623	Baoying Co. 宝应县	321024	~~Jingjiang Co.~~ 靖江县	321025	~~Taixing Co.~~ 泰兴县
321026	~~Jiangdu Co.~~ 江都县	321027	~~Hanjiang Co.~~ 邗江县	321028	~~Tai Co.~~ 泰县	321029	~~Yizheng Co.~~ 仪征县		
321081	Yizheng city 仪征市	321082	~~Taizhou city~~ 泰州市	321083	~~Xinghua city~~ 兴化市	321084	Gaoyou city 高邮市	321085	~~Taixing city~~ 泰兴市
321086	~~Jingjiang city~~ 靖江市	321087	~~Jiangyan city~~ 姜堰市	321088	~~Jiangdu city~~ 江都市				
321100	Zhenjiang city 镇江市								
321101	District 市辖区	321102	Jingkou 京口区						
321101	District 市辖区			321111	Runzhou 润州区	321112	Dantu 丹徒区		
321121	~~Dantu Co.~~ 丹徒县	321122	~~Danyang Co.~~ 丹阳县	321123	~~Jurong Co.~~ 句容县	321124	~~Yangzhong Co.~~ 扬中县		
321181	Danyang city 丹阳市	321182	Yangzhong city 扬中市	321183	Jurong city 句容市				
321200	Taizhou city 泰州市								
321201	District 市辖区	321202	Hailing 海陵区	321203	Gaogang 高港区	321204	Jiangyan 姜堰区		
321281	Xinghua city 兴化市	321282	Jingjiang city 靖江市	321283	Taixing city 泰兴市	321284	~~Jiangyan city~~ 姜堰市		
321300	Suqian city 宿迁市								
321301	District 市辖区	321302	Sucheng 宿城区						
321301	District 市辖区			321311	Suyu 宿豫区				
321321	~~Suyu Co.~~ 宿豫县	321322	Shuyang Co. 沭阳县	321323	Siyang Co. 泗阳县	321324	Sihong Co. 泗洪县		
322100	~~Xuzhou Prefecture~~ 徐州地区								
322200	~~Huaiyin Prefecture~~ 淮阴地区								
322300	~~Yancheng Prefecture~~ 盐城地区								
322400	~~Yangzhou Prefecture~~ 扬州地区								
322500	~~Nantong Prefecture~~ 南通地区								
322600	~~Zhenjiang Prefecture~~ 镇江地区								
322700	~~Suzhou Prefecture~~ 苏州地区								
322800	~~Luhe Prefecture~~ 六合地区								
329000	~~Direct administration~~ 省直辖								
329001	~~Taizhou city~~ 泰州市	329002	~~Yizheng city~~ 仪征市	329003	~~Changshu city~~ 常熟市	329004	~~Zhangjiagang city~~ 张家港市	329005	~~Jiangyin city~~ 江阴市
329006	~~Suqian city~~ 宿迁市	329007	~~Danyang city~~ 丹阳市	329008	~~Dongtai city~~ 东台市	329009	~~Xinghua city~~ 兴化市	329010	~~Huai'an city~~ 淮安市
329011	~~Yixing city~~ 宜兴市								

== Zhejiang (33) ==
330000	Zhejiang Province 浙江省								
330100	Hangzhou city 杭州市								
330101	District 市辖区	330102	Shangcheng 上城区	330103	Xiacheng 下城区	330104	Jianggan 江干区	330105	Gongshu 拱墅区
330101	District 市辖区	330106	Xihu 西湖区	330107	~~Banshan~~ 半山区	330108	Binjiang 滨江区	330109	Xiaoshan 萧山区
330101	District 市辖区	330110	Yuhang 余杭区	330111	Fuyang 富阳区	330112	Lin'an 临安区		
330101	District 市辖区					330120	~~Shi~~ 市区		
330121	~~Xiaoshan Co.~~ 萧山县	330122	Tonglu Co. 桐庐县	330123	~~Fuyang Co.~~ 富阳县	330124	~~Lin'an Co.~~ 临安县	330125	~~Yuhang Co.~~ 余杭县
330126	~~Jiande Co.~~ 建德县	330127	Chun'an Co. 淳安县						
330181	~~Xiaoshan city~~ 萧山市	330182	Jiande city 建德市	330183	~~Fuyang city~~ 富阳市	330184	~~Yuhang city~~ 余杭市	330185	~~Lin'an city~~ 临安市
330200	Ningbo city 宁波市								
330201	District 市辖区	330202	~~Zhenming~~ 镇明区	330203	Haishu 海曙区	330204	~~Jiangdong~~ 江东区	330205	Jiangbei 江北区
330201	District 市辖区	330206	Beilun 北仑区						
330201	District 市辖区			330211	Zhenhai 镇海区	330212	Yinzhou 鄞州区	330213	Fenghua 奉化区
330201	District 市辖区			210319	~~Yuyao city~~ 余姚市	210320	~~Shi~~ 市区		
330221	~~Zhenhai Co.~~ 镇海县	330222	~~Cixi Co.~~ 慈溪县	330223	~~Yuyao Co.~~ 余姚县	330224	~~Fenghua Co.~~ 奉化县	330225	Xiangshan Co. 象山县
330226	Ninghai Co. 宁海县	330227	~~Yin Co.~~ 鄞县						
330281	Yuyao city 余姚市	330282	Cixi city 慈溪市	330283	~~Fenghua city~~ 奉化市				
330300	Wenzhou city 温州市								
330301	District 市辖区	330302	Lucheng 鹿城区	330303	Longwan 龙湾区	330304	Ouhai 瓯海区	330305	Dongtou 洞头区
330301	District 市辖区					330320	~~Shi~~ 市区		
330321	~~Ouhai Co.~~ 瓯海县	330322	~~Dongtou Co.~~ 洞头县	330323	~~Yueqing Co.~~ 乐清县	330324	Yongjia Co. 永嘉县	330325	~~Rui'an Co.~~ 瑞安县
330326	Pingyang Co. 平阳县	330327	Cangnan Co. 苍南县	330328	Wencheng Co. 文成县	330329	Taishun Co. 泰顺县		
330381	Rui'an city 瑞安市	330382	Yueqing city 乐清市						
330400	Jiaxing city 嘉兴市								
330401	District 市辖区	330402	Nanhu 南湖区						
330401	District 市辖区			330411	Xiuzhou 秀洲区				
330421	Jiashan Co. 嘉善县	330422	~~Pinghu Co.~~ 平湖县	330423	~~Haining Co.~~ 海宁县	330424	Haiyan Co. 海盐县	330425	~~Tongxiang Co.~~ 桐乡县
330481	Haining city 海宁市	330482	Pinghu city 平湖市	330483	Tongxiang city 桐乡市				
330500	Huzhou city 湖州市								
330501	District 市辖区	330502	Wuxing 吴兴区	330503	Nanxun 南浔区				
330501	District 市辖区			330511	~~Jiao~~ 郊区				
330521	Deqing Co. 德清县	330522	Changxing Co. 长兴县	330523	Anji Co. 安吉县				
330600	Shaoxing city 绍兴市								
330601	District 市辖区	330602	Yuecheng 越城区	330603	Keqiao 柯桥区	330604	Shangyu 上虞区		
330621	~~Shaoxing Co.~~ 绍兴县	330622	~~Shangyu Co.~~ 上虞县	330623	~~Sheng Co.~~ 嵊县	330624	Xinchang Co. 新昌县	330625	~~Zhuji Co.~~ 诸暨县
330681	Zhuji city 诸暨市	330682	~~Shangyu city~~ 上虞市	330683	Shengzhou city 嵊州市				
330700	Jinhua city 金华市								
330701	District 市辖区	330702	Wucheng 婺城区	330703	Jindong 金东区				
330701	District 市辖区			330719	~~Lanxi Co.~~ 兰溪县				
330721	~~Jinghua Co.~~ 金华县	330722	~~Yongkang Co.~~ 永康县	330723	Wuyi Co. 武义县	330724	~~Dongyang Co.~~ 东阳县	330725	~~Yiwu Co.~~ 义乌县
330726	Pujiang Co. 浦江县	330727	Pan'an Co. 磐安县						
330781	Lanxi city 兰溪市	330782	Yiwu city 义乌市	330783	Dongyang city 东阳市	330784	Yongkang city 永康市		
330800	Quzhou city 衢州市								
330801	District 市辖区	330802	Kecheng 柯城区	330803	Qujiang 衢江区				
330821	~~Qu Co.~~ 衢县	330822	Changshan Co. 常山县	330823	~~Jiangshan Co.~~ 江山县	330824	Kaihua Co. 开化县	330825	Longyou Co. 龙游县
330881	Jiangshan city 江山市								
330900	Zhoushan city 舟山市								
330901	District 市辖区	330902	Dinghai 定海区	330903	Putuo 普陀区				
330921	Xiangshan Co. 岱山县	330922	Shengsi Co. 嵊泗县						
331000	Taizhou city 台州市								
331001	District 市辖区	331002	Jiaojiang 椒江区	331003	Huangyan 黄岩区	331004	Luqiao 路桥区		
331021	~~Yuhuan Co.~~ 玉环县	331022	Sanmen Co. 三门县	331023	Tiantai Co. 天台县	331024	Xianju Co. 仙居县		
331081	Wenling city 温岭市	331082	Linhai city 临海市	331083	Yuhuan city 玉环市				
331100	Lishui city 丽水市								
331101	District 市辖区	331102	Liandu 莲都区						
331121	Qingtian Co. 青田县	331122	Jinyun Co. 缙云县	331123	Suichang Co. 遂昌县	331124	Songyang Co. 松阳县	331125	Yunhe Co. 云和县
331126	Qingyuan Co. 庆元县	331127	Jingning Co. 景宁县						
331181	Longquan city 龙泉市								
332100	~~Jiaxing Prefecture~~ 嘉兴地区								
332200	~~Ningbo Prefecture~~ 宁波地区								
332300	~~Shaoxing Prefecture~~ 绍兴地区								
332400	~~Jinhua Prefecture~~ 金华地区								
332500	~~Lishui Prefecture~~ 丽水地区								
332600	~~Taizhou Prefecture~~ 台州地区								
332700	~~Zhoushan Prefecture~~ 舟山地区								
332800	~~Wenzhou Prefecture~~ 温州地区								
339000	~~Direct administration~~ 省直辖								
339001	~~Yuyao city~~ 余姚市	339002	~~Haining city~~ 海宁市	339003	~~Lanxi city~~ 兰溪市	339004	~~Ruian city~~ 瑞安市	339005	~~Xiaoshan city~~ 萧山市
339006	~~Jiangshan city~~ 江山市	339007	~~Yiwu city~~ 义乌市	339008	~~Dongyang city~~ 东阳市	339009	~~Cixi city~~ 慈溪市	339010	~~Fenghua city~~ 奉化市
339011	~~Zhuji city~~ 诸暨市								

== Anhui (34) ==
340000	Anhui Province 安徽省								
340100	Hefei city 合肥市								
340101	District 市辖区	340102	Yaohai 瑶海区	340103	Luyang 庐阳区	340104	Shushan 蜀山区		
340101	District 市辖区			340111	Baohe 包河区				
340101	District 市辖区					340120	~~Shi~~ 市区		
340121	Changfeng Co. 长丰县	340122	Feidong Co. 肥东县	340123	Feixi Co. 肥西县	340124	Lujiang Co. 庐江县		
340181	Chaohu city 巢湖市								
340200	Wuhu city 芜湖市								
340201	District 市辖区	340202	Jinghu 镜湖区	340203	Yijiang 弋江区	340204	~~Xinwu~~ 新芜区	340205	~~Yuxikou~~ 裕溪口区
340201	District 市辖区	340206	~~Siheshan~~ 四褐山区	340207	Jiujiang 鸠江区	340208	Sanshan 三山区		
340201	District 市辖区			340211	~~Jiao~~ 郊区				
340201	District 市辖区					340220	~~Shi~~ 市区		
340221	Wuhu Co. 芜湖县	340222	Fanchang Co. 繁昌县	340223	Nanling Co. 南陵县	340224	~~Qingyang Co.~~ 青阳县	340225	Wuwei Co. 无为县
340300	Bengbu city 蚌埠市								
340301	District 市辖区	340302	Longzihu 龙子湖区	340303	Bengshan 蚌山区	340304	Yuhui 禹会区		
340301	District 市辖区			340311	Huaishang 淮上区				
340321	Huaiyuan Co. 怀远县	340322	Wuhe Co. 五河县	340323	Guzhen Co. 固镇县				
340400	Huainan city 淮南市								
340401	District 市辖区	340402	Datong 大通区	340403	Tianjia'an 田家庵区	340404	Xiejiaji 谢家集区	340405	Bagongshan 八公山区
340401	District 市辖区	340406	Panji 潘集区						
340401	District 市辖区					340420	~~Shi~~ 市区		
340421	Fengtai Co. 凤台县	340422	Shou Co. 寿县						
340500	Ma'anshan city 马鞍山市								
340501	District 市辖区	340502	~~Jinjiazhuang~~ 金家庄区	340503	Huashan 花山区	340504	Yushan 雨山区	340505	~~Xiangshan~~ 向山区
340501	District 市辖区	340506	Bowang 博望区						
340521	Dangtu Co. 当涂县	340522	Hanshan Co. 含山县	340523	He Co. 和县				
340600	Huaibei city 淮北市								
340601	District 市辖区	340602	Duji 杜集区	340603	Xuanwu 相山区	340604	Lieshan 烈山区		
340601	District 市辖区					340620	~~Shi~~ 市区		
340621	Suixi Co. 濉溪县								
340700	Tongling city 铜陵市								
340701	District 市辖区	340702	~~Tongguanshan~~ 铜官山区	340703	~~Shizishan~~ 狮子山区	340704	~~Tongshan~~ 铜山区	340705	Tongguan 铜官区
340701	District 市辖区	340706	Yi'an 义安区						
340701	District 市辖区			340711	Jiao 郊区				
340701	District 市辖区					340720	~~Shi~~ 市区		
340721	~~Tongling Co.~~ 铜陵县	340722	Zongyang Co. 枞阳县						
340800	Anqing city 安庆市								
340801	District 市辖区	340802	Yingjiang 迎江区	340803	Daguan 大观区				
340801	District 市辖区			340811	Yixiu 宜秀区				
340821	~~Tongcheng Co.~~ 桐城县	340822	Huaining Co. 怀宁县	340823	~~Congyang Co.~~ 枞阳县	340824	Qianshan Co. 潜山县	340825	Taihu Co. 太湖县
340826	Susong Co. 宿松县	340827	Wangjiang Co. 望江县	340828	Yuexi Co. 岳西县				
340881	Tongcheng city 桐城市								
340900	~~Direct administration~~ 省直辖								
340901	~~Huangshan city~~ 黄山市								
341000	Huangshan city 黄山市								
341001	District 市辖区	341002	Tunxi 屯溪区	341003	Huangshan 黄山区	341004	Huizhou 徽州区		
341021	She Co. 歙县	341022	Xiuning Co. 休宁县	341023	Yi Co. 黟县	341024	Qimen Co. 祁门县		
341100	Chuzhou city 滁州市								
341101	District 市辖区	341102	Langya 琅琊区	341103	Nanqiao 南谯区				
341121	~~Tianchang Co.~~ 天长县	341122	Lai'an Co. 来安县	341123	~~Chu Co.~~ 滁县	341124	Quanjiao Co. 全椒县	341125	Dingyuan Co. 定远县
341126	Fengyang Co. 凤阳县	341127	~~Jiashan Co.~~ 嘉山县						
341181	Tianchang city 天长市	341182	Mingguang city 明光市						
341200	Fuyang city 阜阳市								
341201	District 市辖区	341202	Yingzhou 颍州区	341203	Yingdong 颍东区	341204	Yingquan 颍泉区		
341221	Linquan Co. 临泉县	341222	Taihe Co. 太和县	341223	~~Guoyang Co.~~ 涡阳县	341224	~~Mengcheng Co.~~ 蒙城县	341225	Funan Co. 阜南县
341226	Yingshang Co. 颍上县	341227	~~Lixin Co.~~ 利辛县						
341281	~~Bozhou city~~ 亳州市	341282	Jieshou city 界首市						
341300	Suzhou city 宿州市								
341301	District 市辖区	341302	Yongqiao 埇桥区						
341321	Dangshan Co. 砀山县	341322	Xiao Co. 萧县	341323	Lingbi Co. 灵璧县	341324	Si Co. 泗县		
341400	~~Chaohu city~~ 巢湖市								
341401	~~District~~ 市辖区	341402	~~Juchao~~ 居巢区						
341421	~~Lujiang Co.~~ 庐江县	341422	~~Wuwei Co.~~ 无为县	341423	~~Hanshan Co.~~ 含山县	341424	~~He Co.~~ [和县		
341500	Lu'an city 六安市								
341501	District 市辖区	341502	Jin'an 金安区	341503	Yu'an 裕安区	341504	Yeji 叶集区		
341521	~~Shou Co.~~ 寿县	341522	Huoqiu Co. 霍邱县	341523	Shucheng Co. 舒城县	341524	Jinzhai Co. 金寨县	341525	Huoshan Co. 霍山县
341600	Bozhou city 亳州市								
341601	District 市辖区	341602	Qiaocheng 谯城区						
341621	Guoyang Co. 涡阳县	341622	Mengcheng Co. 蒙城县	341623	Lixin Co. 利辛县				
341700	Chizhou city 池州市								
341701	District 市辖区	341702	Guichi 贵池区						
341721	Dongzhi Co. 东至县	341722	Shitai Co. 石台县	341723	Qingyang Co. 青阳县				
341800	Xuancheng city 宣城市								
341801	District 市辖区	341802	Xuanzhou 宣州区						
341821	Langxi Co. 郎溪县	341822	Guangde Co. 广德县	341823	Jing Co. 泾县	341824	Jixi Co. 绩溪县	341825	Jingde Co. 旌德县
341881	Ningguo city 宁国市								
342100	~~Fuyang Prefecture~~ 阜阳地区								
342200	~~Suxian Prefecture~~ 宿县地区								
342300	~~Chuxian Prefecture~~ 滁县地区								
342400	~~Lu'an Prefecture~~ 六安地区								
342500	~~Xuancheng Prefecture~~ 宣城地区								
342600	~~Chaohu Prefecture~~ 巢湖地区								
342700	~~Huizhou Prefecture~~ 徽州地区								
342800	~~Anqing Prefecture~~ 安庆地区								
342900	~~Chizhou Prefecture~~ 池州地区								

== Fujian (35) ==
350000	Fujian Province 福建省								
350100	Fuzhou city 福州市								
350101	District 市辖区	350102	Gulou 鼓楼区	350103	Taijiang 台江区	350104	Cangshan 仓山区	350105	Mawei 马尾区
350101	District 市辖区			350111	Jin'an 晋安区	350112	Changle 长乐区		
350101	District 市辖区					350120	~~Shi~~ 市区		
350121	Minhou Co. 闽侯县	350122	Lianjiang Co. 连江县	350123	Luoyuan Co. 罗源县	350124	Minqing Co. 闽清县	350125	Yongtai Co. 永泰县
350126	~~Changle Co.~~ 长乐县	350127	~~Fuqing Co.~~ 福清县	350128	Pingtan Co. 平潭县				
350181	Fuqing city 福清市	350182	~~Changle city~~ 长乐市						
350200	Xiamen city 厦门市								
350201	District 市辖区	350202	~~Gulangyu~~ 鼓浪屿区	350203	Siming 思明区	350204	~~Kaiyuan~~ 开元区	350205	Haicang 海沧区
350201	District 市辖区	350206	Huli 湖里区						
350201	District 市辖区			350211	Jimei 集美区	350212	Tong'an 同安区	350213	Xiang'an 翔安区
350201	District 市辖区					350220	~~Shi~~ 市区		
350221	~~Tong'an Co.~~ 同安县								
350300	Putian city 莆田市								
350301	District 市辖区	350302	Chengxiang 城厢区	350303	Hanjiang 涵江区	350304	Licheng 荔城区	350305	Xiuyu 秀屿区
350321	~~Putian Co.~~ 莆田县	350322	Xianyou Co. 仙游县						
350400	Sanming city 三明市								
350401	District 市辖区	350402	Meilie 梅列区	350403	Sanyuan 三元区				
						350420	~~Yong'an city~~ 永安市		
350421	Mingxi Co. 明溪县	350422	~~Yong'an Co.~~ 永安县	350423	Qingliu Co. 清流县	350424	Ninghua Co. 宁化县	350425	Datian Co. 大田县
350426	Youxi Co. 尤溪县	350427	Sha Co. 沙县	350428	Jiangle Co. 将乐县	350429	Taining Co. 泰宁县	350430	Jianning Co. 建宁县
350481	Yong'an city 永安市								
350500	Quanzhou city 泉州市								
350501	District 市辖区	350502	Licheng 鲤城区	350503	Fengze 丰泽区	350504	Luojiang 洛江区	350505	Quangang 泉港区
350521	Hui'an Co. 惠安县	350522	~~Jinjiang Co.~~ 晋江县	350523	~~Nan'an Co.~~ 南安县	350524	Anxi Co. 安溪县	350525	Yongchun Co. 永春县
350526	Dehua Co. 德化县	350527	Kinmen Co. 金門縣						
350581	Shishi city 石狮市	350582	Jinjiang city 晋江市	350583	Nan'an city 南安市				
350600	Zhangzhou city 漳州市								
350601	District 市辖区	350602	Xiangcheng 芗城区	350603	Longwen 龙文区				
350621	~~Longhai Co.~~ 龙海县	350622	Yunxiao Co. 云霄县	350623	Zhangpu Co. 漳浦县	350624	Zhao'an Co. 诏安县	350625	Changtai Co. 长泰县
350626	Dongshan Co. 东山县	350627	Nanjing Co. 南靖县	350628	Pinghe Co. 平和县	350629	Hua'an Co. 华安县		
350681	Longhai city 龙海市								
350700	Nanping city 南平市								
350701	District 市辖区	350702	Yanping 延平区	350703	Jianyang 建阳区				
350721	Shunchang Co. 顺昌县	350722	Pucheng Co. 浦城县	350723	Guangze Co. 光泽县	350724	Songxi Co. 松溪县	350725	Zhenghe Co. 政和县
350781	Shaowu city 邵武市	350782	Wuyishan city 武夷山市	350783	Jian'ou city 建瓯市	350784	~~Jianyang city~~ 建阳市		
350800	Longyan city 龙岩市								
350801	District 市辖区	350802	Xinluo 新罗区	350803	Yongding 永定区				
350821	Changting Co. 长汀县	350822	~~Yongding Co.~~ 永定县	350823	Shanghang Co. 上杭县	350824	Wuping Co. 武平县	350825	Liancheng Co. 连城县
350881	Zhangping city 漳平市								
350900	Ningde city 宁德市								
350901	District 市辖区	350902	Jiaocheng 蕉城区						
350921	Xiapu Co. 霞浦县	350922	Gutian Co. 古田县	350923	Pingnan Co. 屏南县	350924	Shouning Co. 寿宁县	350925	Zhouning Co. 周宁县
350926	Zherong Co. 柘荣县								
350981	Fu'an city 福安市	350982	Fuding city 福鼎市						
352100	~~Nanping Prefecture~~ 南平地区								
352200	~~Ningde Prefecture~~ 宁德地区								
352300	~~Putian Prefecture~~ 莆田地区								
352400	~~Jinjiang Prefecture~~ 晋江地区								
352500	~~Longxi Prefecture~~ 龙溪地区								
352600	~~Longyan Prefecture~~ 龙岩地区								
352700	~~Sanming Prefecture~~ 三明地区								
359000	~~Direct administration~~ 省直辖								
359001	~~Yong'an city~~ 永安市	359002	~~Shishi city~~ 石狮市						

== Jiangxi (36) ==
360000	Jiangxi Province 江西省								
360100	Nanchang city 南昌市								
360101	District 市辖区	360102	Donghu 东湖区	360103	Xihu 西湖区	360104	Qingyunpu 青云谱区	360105	Wanli 湾里区
360101	District 市辖区			360111	Qingshanhu 青山湖区	360112	Xinjian 新建区		
360101	District 市辖区					360120	~~Shi~~ 市区		
360121	Nanchang Co. 南昌县	360122	~~Xinjian Co.~~ 新建县	360123	Anyi Co. 安义县	360124	Jinxian Co. 进贤县		
360200	Jingdezhen city 景德镇市								
360201	District 市辖区	360202	Changjiang 昌江区	360203	Zhushan 珠山区				
360201	District 市辖区			360211	~~Ehu~~ 鹅湖区	360212	~~Jiaotan~~ 蛟潭区		
360221	~~Leping Co.~~ 乐平县	360222	Fuliang Co. 浮梁县						
360281	Leping city 乐平市								
360300	Pingxiang city 萍乡市								
360301	District 市辖区	360302	Anyuan 安源区						
360301	District 市辖区			360311	~~Shangli~~ 上栗区	360312	~~Luxi~~ 芦溪区	360313	Xiangdong 湘东区
360321	Lianhua Co. 莲花县	360322	Shangli Co. 上栗县	360323	Luxi Co. 芦溪县				
360400	Jiujiang city 九江市								
360401	District 市辖区	360402	Lianxi 濂溪区	360403	Xunyang 浔阳区	360404	Chaisang 柴桑区		
360421	~~Jiujiang Co.~~ 九江县	360422	~~Ruichang Co.~~ 瑞昌县	360423	Wuning Co. 武宁县	360424	Xiushui Co. 修水县	360425	Yongxiu Co. 永修县
360426	De'an Co. 德安县	360427	~~Xingzi Co.~~ 星子县	360428	Duchang Co. 都昌县	360429	Hukou Co. 湖口县	360430	Pengze Co. 彭泽县
360481	Ruichang city 瑞昌市	360482	Gongqingcheng city 共青城市	360483	Lushan city 庐山市				
360500	Xinyu city 新余市								
360501	District 市辖区	360502	Yushui 渝水区						
360521	Fenyi Co. 分宜县								
360600	Yingtan city 鹰潭市								
360601	District 市辖区	360602	Yuehu 月湖区	360603	Yujiang 余江区				
360621	~~Guixi Co.~~ 贵溪县	360622	~~Yujiang Co.~~ 余江县						
360681	Guixi city 贵溪市								
360700	Ganzhou city 赣州市								
360701	District 市辖区	360702	Zhanggong 章贡区	360703	Nankang 南康区	360704	Ganxian 赣县区		
360721	~~Gan Co.~~ 赣县	360722	Xinfeng Co. 信丰县	360723	Dayu Co. 大余县	360724	Shangyou Co. 上犹县	360725	Chongyi Co. 崇义县
360726	Anyuan Co. 安远县	360727	Longnan Co. 龙南县	360728	Dingnan Co. 定南县	360729	Quannan Co. 全南县	360730	Ningdu Co. 宁都县
360731	Yudu Co. 于都县	360732	Xingguo Co. 兴国县	360733	Huichang Co. 会昌县	360734	Xunwu Co. 寻乌县	360735	Shicheng Co. 石城县
360781	Ruijin city 瑞金市	360782	~~Nankang city~~ 南康市						
360800	Ji'an city 吉安市								
360801	District 市辖区	360802	Qingyuan 吉州区	360803	Jizhou 青原区				
360821	Ji'an Co. 吉安县	360822	Jishui Co. 吉水县	360823	Xiajiang Co. 峡江县	360824	Xingan Co. 新干县	360825	Yongfeng Co. 永丰县
360826	Taihe Co. 泰和县	360827	Suichuan Co. 遂川县	360828	Wan'an Co. 万安县	360829	Anfu Co. 安福县	360830	Yongxin 永新县
360881	Jinggangshan city 井冈山市								
360900	Yichun city 宜春市								
360901	District 市辖区	360902	Yuanzhou 袁州区						
360921	Fengxin Co. 奉新县	360922	Wanzai Co. 万载县	360923	Shanggao Co. 上高县	360924	Yifeng Co. 宜丰县	360925	Jing'an Co. 靖安县
360926	Tonggu Co. 铜鼓县								
360981	Fengcheng city 丰城市	360982	Zhangshu city 樟树市	360983	Gao'an city 高安市				
361000	Fuzhou city 抚州市								
361001	District 市辖区	361002	Linchuan 临川区	361003	Dongxiang 东乡区				
361021	Nancheng Co. 南城县	361022	Lichuan Co. 黎川县	361023	Nanfeng Co. 南丰县	361024	Chongren Co. 崇仁县	361025	Le'an Co. 乐安县
361026	Yihuang Co. 宜黄县	361027	Jinxi Co. 金溪县	361028	Zixi Co. 资溪县	361029	~~Dongxiang Co.~~ 东乡县	361030	Guangchang Co. 广昌县
361100	Shangrao city 上饶市								
361101	District 市辖区	361102	Xinzhou 信州区	361103	Guangfeng 广丰区				
361121	Shangrao Co. 上饶县	361122	~~Guangfeng Co.~~ 广丰县	361123	Yushan Co. 玉山县	361124	Yanshan Co. 铅山县	361125	Hengfeng Co. 横峰县
361126	Yiyang Co. 弋阳县	361127	Yugan Co. 余干县	361128	Poyang Co. 鄱阳县	361129	Wannian Co. 万年县	361130	Wuyuan Co. 婺源县
361181	Dexing 德兴市								
362100	~~Ganzhou Prefecture~~ 赣州地区								
362200	~~Yichun Prefecture~~ 宜春地区								
362300	~~Shangrao Prefecture~~ 上饶地区								
362400	~~Ji'an Prefecture~~ 吉安地区								
362500	~~Fuzhou Prefecture~~ 抚州地区								
362600	~~Jiujiang Prefecture~~ 九江地区								

== Shandong (37) ==
370000	Shandong Province 山东省								
370100	Jinan city 济南市								
370101	District 市辖区	370102	Lixia 历下区	370103	Shizhong 市中区	370104	Huaiyin 槐荫区	370105	Tianqiao 天桥区
370101	District 市辖区			370111	~~Jiao~~ 郊区	370112	Licheng 历城区	370113	Changqing 长清区
370101	District 市辖区	370114	Zhangqiu 章丘区	370115	Jiyang 济阳区	370116	Laiwu 莱芜区	370117	Gangcheng 钢城区
370101	District 市辖区					370120	~~Shi~~ 市区		
370121	~~Licheng Co.~~ 历城县	370122	~~Zhangqiu Co.~~ 章丘县	370123	~~Changqing Co.~~ 长清县	370124	Pingyin Co. 平阴县	370125	~~Jiyang Co.~~ 济阳县
370126	Shanghe Co. 商河县								
370181	~~Zhangqiu city~~ 章丘市								
370200	Qingdao city 青岛市								
370201	District 市辖区	370202	Shinan 市南区	370203	Shibei 市北区	370204	~~Taidong~~ 台东区	370205	~~Sifang~~ 四方区
370201	District 市辖区	370206	~~Cangkou~~ 沧口区			370208	~~Licang~~ 李沧区	370209	~~Chengyang~~ 城阳区
370201	District 市辖区			370211	Xihai'an 西海岸新区	370212	Laoshan 崂山区	370213	Licang 李沧区
370201	District 市辖区	370214	Chengyang 城阳区	370215	Jimo 即墨区				
370201	District 市辖区					370220	~~Shi~~ 市区		
370221	~~Laoshan Co.~~ 崂山县	370222	~~Jimo Co.~~ 即墨县	370223	~~Jiaonan Co.~~ 胶南县	370224	~~Jiao Co.~~ 胶县	370225	~~Laixi Co.~~ 莱西县
370226	~~Pingdu Co.~~ 平度县								
370281	Jiaozhou city 胶州市	370282	~~Jimo city~~ 即墨市	370283	Pingdu city 平度市	370284	~~Jiaonan city~~ 胶南市	370285	Laixi city 莱西市
370300	Zibo city 淄博市								
370301	District 市辖区	370302	Zichuan 淄川区	370303	Zhangdian 张店区	370304	Boshan 博山区	370305	Linzi 临淄区
370301	District 市辖区	370306	Zhoucun 周村区						
370321	Huantai Co. 桓台县	370322	Gaoqing Co. 高青县	370323	Yiyuan Co. 沂源县				
370400	Zaozhuang city 枣庄市								
370401	District 市辖区	370402	Shizhong 市中区	370403	Xuecheng 薛城区	370404	Yicheng 峄城区	370405	Tai'erzhuang 台儿庄区
370401	District 市辖区	370406	Shanting 山亭区						
370401	District 市辖区					370420	~~Shi~~ 市区		
370421	~~Teng Co.~~ 滕县								
370481	Tengzhou city 滕州市								
370500	Dongying city 东营市								
370501	District 市辖区	370502	Dongying 东营区	370503	Hekou 河口区	370504	~~Niuzhuang~~ 牛庄区	370505	Kenli 垦利区
370521	~~Kenli Co.~~ 垦利县	370522	Lijin Co. 利津县	370523	Guangrao Co. 广饶县				
370600	Yantai city 烟台市								
370601	District 市辖区	370602	Zhifu 芝罘区			370604	~~Muping~~ 牟平区	370605	~~Laishan~~ 莱山区
370601	District 市辖区			370611	Fushan 福山区	370612	Muping 牟平区	370613	Laishan 莱山区
				370619	~~Weihai city~~ 威海市				
370621	~~Fushan Co.~~ 福山县	370622	~~Penglai Co.~~ 蓬莱县	370623	~~Huang Co.~~ 黄县	370624	~~Zhaoyuan Co.~~ 招远县	370625	~~Ye Co.~~ 掖县
370626	~~Laixi Co.~~ 莱西县	370627	~~Laiyang Co.~~ 莱阳县	370628	~~Qixia Co.~~ 栖霞县	370629	~~Haiyang Co.~~ 海阳县	370630	~~Rushan Co.~~ 乳山县
370631	~~Muping Co.~~ 牟平县	370632	~~Wendeng Co.~~ 文登县	370633	~~Rongcheng Co.~~ 荣成县	370634	Changdao Co. 长岛县		
370681	Longkou city 龙口市	370682	Laiyang city 莱阳市	370683	Laizhou city 莱州市	370684	Penglai city 蓬莱市	370685	Zhaoyuan city 招远市
370686	Qixia city 栖霞市	370687	Haiyang city 海阳市						
370700	Weifang city 潍坊市								
370701	District 市辖区	370702	Weicheng 潍城区	370703	Hanting 寒亭区	370704	Fangzi 坊子区	370705	Kuiwen 奎文区
				370719	~~Qingzhou city~~ 青州市				
370721	~~Yidu Co.~~ 益都县	370722	~~Anqiu Co.~~ 安丘县	370723	~~Shouguang Co.~~ 寿光县	370724	Linqu Co. 临朐县	370725	Changle Co. 昌乐县
370726	~~Changyi Co.~~ 昌邑县	370727	~~Gaomi Co.~~ 高密县	370728	~~Zhucheng Co.~~ 诸城县	370729	~~Wulian Co.~~ 五莲县		
370781	Qingzhou city 青州市	370782	Zhucheng city 诸城市	370783	Shouguang city 寿光市	370784	Anqiu city 安丘市	370785	Gaomi city 高密市
370786	Changyi city 昌邑市								
370800	Jining city 济宁市								
370801	District 市辖区	370802	~~Shizhong~~ 市中区	370803	Rencheng 任城区	370804	Yanzhou 兖州区		
				370819	~~Qufu city~~ 曲阜市				
370821	~~Jining Co.~~ 济宁县	370822	~~Yanzhou Co.~~ 兖州县	370823	~~Qufu Co.~~ 曲阜县	370824	~~Sishui Co.~~ 泗水县	370825	~~Zou Co.~~ 邹县
370826	Weishan Co. 微山县	370827	Yutai Co. 鱼台县	370828	Jinxiang Co. 金乡县	370829	Jiaxiang Co. 嘉祥县	370830	Wenshang Co. 汶上县
370831	Sishui Co. 泗水县	370832	Liangshan Co. 梁山县						
370881	Qufu city 曲阜市	370882	~~Yanzhou city~~ 兖州市	370883	Zoucheng city 邹城市				
370900	Tai'an city 泰安市								
370901	District 市辖区	370902	Taishan 泰山区	370903	~~Daiyue~~ 岱岳区				
370901	District 市辖区			370911	Daiyue 岱岳区				
				370919	~~Laiwu city~~ 莱芜市	370920	~~Xintai city~~ 新泰市		
370921	Ningyang Co. 宁阳县	370922	~~Feicheng Co.~~ 肥城县	370923	Dongping Co. 东平县				
370981	~~Laiwu city~~ 莱芜市	370982	Xintai city 新泰市	370983	Feicheng city 肥城市				
371000	Weihai city 威海市								
371001	District 市辖区	371002	Huancui 环翠区	371003	Wendeng 文登区				
371021	~~Rushan Co.~~ 乳山县	371022	~~Wendeng Co.~~ 文登县						
371081	~~Wendeng city~~ 文登市	371082	Rongcheng city 荣成市	371083	Rushan city 乳山市				
371100	Rizhao city 日照市								
371101	District 市辖区	371102	Donggang 东港区	371103	Lanshan 岚山区				
371121	Wulian Co. 五莲县	371122	Ju Co. 莒县						
371200	~~Laiwu city~~ 莱芜市								
371201	~~District~~ 市辖区	371202	~~Laicheng~~ 莱城区	371203	~~Gangcheng~~ 钢城区				
371300	Linyi city 临沂市								
371301	District 市辖区	371302	Lanshan 兰山区						
				371311	Luozhuang 罗庄区	371312	Hedong 河东区		
371321	Yinan Co. 沂南县	371322	Tancheng Co. 郯城县	371323	Yishui Co. 沂水县	371324	Lanling Co. 兰陵县	371325	Fei Co. 费县
371326	Pingyi Co. 平邑县	371327	Junan Co. 莒南县	371328	Mengyin Co. 蒙阴县	371329	Linshu Co. 临沭县		
371400	Dezhou city 德州市								
371401	District 市辖区	371402	Decheng 德城区	371403	Lingcheng 陵城区				
371421	~~Ling Co.~~ 陵县	371422	Ningjin Co. 宁津县	371423	Qingyun Co. 庆云县	371424	Linyi Co. 临邑县	371425	Qihe Co. 齐河县
371426	Pingyuan Co. 平原县	371427	Xiajin Co. 夏津县	371428	Wucheng Co. 武城县				
371481	Leling city 乐陵市	371482	Yucheng city 禹城市						
371500	Liaocheng city 聊城市								
371501	District 市辖区	371502	Dongchangfu 东昌府区						
371521	Yanggu Co. 阳谷县	371522	Shen Co. 莘县	371523	Chiping Co. 茌平县	371524	Dong'e Co. 东阿县	371525	Guan Co. 冠县
371526	Gaotang Co. 高唐县								
371581	Linqing city 临清市								
371600	Binzhou city 滨州市								
371601	District 市辖区	371602	Bincheng 滨城区	371603	Zhanhua 沾化区				
371621	Huimin Co. 惠民县	371622	Yangxin Co. 阳信县	371623	Wudi Co. 无棣县	371624	~~Zhanhua Co.~~ 沾化县	371625	Boxing Co. 博兴县
371626	Zouping 邹平县								
371700	Heze city 菏泽市								
371701	District 市辖区	370002	Mudan 牡丹区	371703	Dingtao 定陶区				
371721	Cao Co. 曹县	371722	Shan Co. 单县	371723	Chengwu Co. 成武县	371724	Juye Co. 巨野县	371725	Yuncheng 郓城县
371726	Juancheng Co. 鄄城县	371727	~~Dingtao Co.~~ 定陶县	371728	Dongming Co. 东明县				
372100	~~Yantai Prefecture~~ 烟台地区								
372200	~~Weifang Prefecture~~ 潍坊地区								
372300	~~Binzhou Prefecture~~ 滨州地区								
372400	~~Dezhou Prefecture~~ 德州地区								
372500	~~Liaocheng Prefecture~~ 聊城地区								
372600	~~Tai'an Prefecture~~ 泰安地区								
372700	~~Jining Prefecture~~ 济宁地区								
372800	~~Linyi Prefecture~~ 临沂地区								
372900	~~Heze Prefecture~~ 菏泽地区								
379000	~~Direct administration~~ 省直辖								
379001	~~Qingzhou city~~ 青州市	379002	~~Longkou city~~ 龙口市	379003	~~Qufu city~~ 曲阜市	379004	~~Laiwu city~~ 莱芜市	379005	~~Xintai city~~ 新泰市
379006	~~Jiaozhou City~~ 胶州市	379007	~~Zhucheng city~~ 诸城市	379008	~~Laiyang city~~ 莱阳市	379009	~~Laizhou city~~ 莱州市	379010	~~Tengzhou city~~ 滕州市
379011	~~Wendeng city~~ 文登市	379012	~~Rongcheng city~~ 荣成市						
