= List of administrative divisions of Anhui =

Anhui Province
- Province
- Capital: Hefei

Prefecture-level divisions
- Prefectural cities: 16

County level divisions
- County cities: 9
- Counties: 50
- Districts: 45

Township level divisions
- Towns: 898
- Townships: 377
- Ethnic townships: 7
- Subdistricts: 225

Villages level divisions
- Communities: 3,480
- Administrative villages: 14,514

Anhui, a province of the People's Republic of China, is made up of the following three levels of administrative division.

== Administrative divisions ==
All of these administrative divisions are explained in greater detail at Administrative divisions of the People's Republic of China. This chart lists only prefecture-level and county-level divisions of Anhui.

Prefecture level (Division code)	County Level				
Prefecture level (Division code)	Name	Chinese	Hanyu Pinyin	Division code	
Hefei city 合肥市; Héféi Shì (Capital) (3401 / HFE)	Yaohai District	瑶海区	Yáohǎi Qū	340102	YAI
Hefei city 合肥市; Héféi Shì (Capital) (3401 / HFE)	Luyang District	庐阳区	Lúyáng Qū	340103	LUG
Hefei city 合肥市; Héféi Shì (Capital) (3401 / HFE)	Shushan District	蜀山区	Shǔshān Qū	340104	SSA
Hefei city 合肥市; Héféi Shì (Capital) (3401 / HFE)	Baohe District	包河区	Bāohé Qū	340111	BAH
Hefei city 合肥市; Héféi Shì (Capital) (3401 / HFE)	Changfeng County	长丰县	Chángfēng Xiàn	340121	CFG
Hefei city 合肥市; Héféi Shì (Capital) (3401 / HFE)	Feidong County	肥东县	Féidōng Xiàn	340122	FDO
Hefei city 合肥市; Héféi Shì (Capital) (3401 / HFE)	Feixi County	肥西县	Féixī Xiàn	340123	FIX
Hefei city 合肥市; Héféi Shì (Capital) (3401 / HFE)	Lujiang County	庐江县	Lújiāng Xiàn	340124	LJG
Hefei city 合肥市; Héféi Shì (Capital) (3401 / HFE)	Chaohu city	巢湖市	Cháohú Shì	340181	CHB
Wuhu city 芜湖市; Wúhú Shì (3402 / WHI)	Jinghu District	镜湖区	Jìnghú Qū	340202	JHW
Wuhu city 芜湖市; Wúhú Shì (3402 / WHI)	Yijiang District	弋江区	Yìjiāng Qū	340203	YIJ
Wuhu city 芜湖市; Wúhú Shì (3402 / WHI)	Jiujiang District	鸠江区	Jiūjiāng Qū	340207	JJW
Wuhu city 芜湖市; Wúhú Shì (3402 / WHI)	Wanzhi District	湾沚区	Wānzhǐ Qū	340209	
Wuhu city 芜湖市; Wúhú Shì (3402 / WHI)	Fanchang District	繁昌区	Fánchāng Qū	340210	
Wuhu city 芜湖市; Wúhú Shì (3402 / WHI)	Nanling County	南陵县	Nánlíng Xiàn	340223	NLX
Wuhu city 芜湖市; Wúhú Shì (3402 / WHI)	Wuwei city	无为市	Wúwéi shì	340281	
Bengbu city 蚌埠市; Bèngbù Shì (Note: not Bàngbù) (3403 / BBU)	Longzihu District	龙子湖区	Lóngzǐhú Qū	340302	LOZ
Bengbu city 蚌埠市; Bèngbù Shì (3403 / BBU)	Bengshan District	蚌山区	Bèngshān Qū (Note: not Bàngshān)	340303	BES
Bengbu city 蚌埠市; Bèngbù Shì (3403 / BBU)	Yuhui District	禹会区	Yǔhuì Qū	340304	YUI
Bengbu city 蚌埠市; Bèngbù Shì (3403 / BBU)	Huaishang District	淮上区	Huáishàng Qū	340311	HIQ
Bengbu city 蚌埠市; Bèngbù Shì (3403 / BBU)	Huaiyuan County	怀远县	Huáiyuǎn Xiàn	340321	HYW
Bengbu city 蚌埠市; Bèngbù Shì (3403 / BBU)	Wuhe County	五河县	Wǔhé Xiàn	340322	WHE
Bengbu city 蚌埠市; Bèngbù Shì (3403 / BBU)	Guzhen County	固镇县	Gùzhèn Xiàn	340323	GZX
Huainan city 淮南市; Huáinán Shì (3404 / HNS)	Datong District	大通区	Dàtōng Qū	340402	DTQ
Huainan city 淮南市; Huáinán Shì (3404 / HNS)	Tianjia'an District	田家庵区	Tiánjiā'ān Qū	340403	TJA
Huainan city 淮南市; Huáinán Shì (3404 / HNS)	Xiejiaji District	谢家集区	Xièjiājí Qū	340404	XJJ
Huainan city 淮南市; Huáinán Shì (3404 / HNS)	Bagongshan District	八公山区	Bāgōngshān Qū	340405	BGS
Huainan city 淮南市; Huáinán Shì (3404 / HNS)	Panji District	潘集区	Pānjí Qū	340406	PJI
Huainan city 淮南市; Huáinán Shì (3404 / HNS)	Fengtai County	凤台县	Fèngtái Xiàn	340421	FTX
Huainan city 淮南市; Huáinán Shì (3404 / HNS)	Shouxian County (Note: Official name registered by the Ministry of Civil Affairs.)	寿县	Shòuxiàn	340422	SHO
Ma'anshan city 马鞍山市; Mǎ'ānshān Shì (3405 / MAA)	Huashan District	花山区	Huāshān Qū	340503	HSM
Ma'anshan city 马鞍山市; Mǎ'ānshān Shì (3405 / MAA)	Yushan District	雨山区	Yǔshān Qū	340504	YSQ
Ma'anshan city 马鞍山市; Mǎ'ānshān Shì (3405 / MAA)	Bowang District	博望区	Bówàng Qū	340506	BWG
Ma'anshan city 马鞍山市; Mǎ'ānshān Shì (3405 / MAA)	Dangtu County	当涂县	Dāngtú Xiàn	340521	DTU
Ma'anshan city 马鞍山市; Mǎ'ānshān Shì (3405 / MAA)	Hanshan County	含山县	Hánshān Xiàn	340522	HSW
Ma'anshan city 马鞍山市; Mǎ'ānshān Shì (3405 / MAA)	Hexian County	和县	Héxiàn	340523	HEX
Huaibei city 淮北市; Huáiběi Shì (3406 / HBE)	Duji District	杜集区	Dùjí Qū	340602	DJQ
Huaibei city 淮北市; Huáiběi Shì (3406 / HBE)	Xiangshan District	相山区	Xiàngshān Qū	340603	XSA
Huaibei city 淮北市; Huáiběi Shì (3406 / HBE)	Lieshan District	烈山区	Lièshān Qū	340604	LHB
Huaibei city 淮北市; Huáiběi Shì (3406 / HBE)	Suixi County	濉溪县	Suīxī Xiàn	340621	SXW
Tongling city 铜陵市; Tónglíng Shì (3407 / TOL)	Tongguan District	铜官区	Tóngguān Qū	340705	TGG
Tongling city 铜陵市; Tónglíng Shì (3407 / TOL)	Yi'an District	义安区	Yì'ān Qū	340706	YIA
Tongling city 铜陵市; Tónglíng Shì (3407 / TOL)	Jiaoqu District	郊区	Jiāoqū	340711	JTL
Tongling city 铜陵市; Tónglíng Shì (3407 / TOL)	Zongyang County	枞阳县	Zōngyáng Xiàn	340722	ZYW
Anqing city 安庆市; Ānqìng Shì (3408 / AQG)	Yingjiang District	迎江区	Yíngjiāng Qū	340802	YJQ
Anqing city 安庆市; Ānqìng Shì (3408 / AQG)	Daguan District	大观区	Dàguān Qū	340803	DGQ
Anqing city 安庆市; Ānqìng Shì (3408 / AQG)	Yixiu District	宜秀区	Yíxiù Qū	340811	YUU
Anqing city 安庆市; Ānqìng Shì (3408 / AQG)	Huaining County	怀宁县	Huáiníng Xiàn	340822	HNW
Anqing city 安庆市; Ānqìng Shì (3408 / AQG)	Taihu County	太湖县	Tàihú Xiàn	340825	THU
Anqing city 安庆市; Ānqìng Shì (3408 / AQG)	Susong County	宿松县	Sùsōng Xiàn	340826	SUS
Anqing city 安庆市; Ānqìng Shì (3408 / AQG)	Wangjiang County	望江县	Wàngjiāng Xiàn	340827	WJX
Anqing city 安庆市; Ānqìng Shì (3408 / AQG)	Yuexi County	岳西县	Yuèxī Xiàn	340828	YXW
Anqing city 安庆市; Ānqìng Shì (3408 / AQG)	Tongcheng city	桐城市	Tóngchéng Shì	340881	TCW
Anqing city 安庆市; Ānqìng Shì (3408 / AQG)	Qianshan city	潜山市	Qiánshān Shì	340882	
Huangshan city 黄山市; Huángshān Shì (3410 / HSN)	Tunxi District	屯溪区	Túnxī Qū	341002	TXN
Huangshan city 黄山市; Huángshān Shì (3410 / HSN)	Huangshan District	黄山区	Huángshān Qū	341003	HSK
Huangshan city 黄山市; Huángshān Shì (3410 / HSN)	Huizhou District	徽州区	Huīzhōu Qū	341004	HZQ
Huangshan city 黄山市; Huángshān Shì (3410 / HSN)	Shexian County	歙县	Shèxiàn	341021	SEX
Huangshan city 黄山市; Huángshān Shì (3410 / HSN)	Xiuning County	休宁县	Xiūníng Xiàn	341022	XUN
Huangshan city 黄山市; Huángshān Shì (3410 / HSN)	Yixian County	黟县	Yīxiàn	341023	YIW
Huangshan city 黄山市; Huángshān Shì (3410 / HSN)	Qimen County	祁门县	Qímén Xiàn	341024	QMN
Chuzhou city 滁州市; Chúzhōu Shì (3411 / CUZ)	Langya District	琅琊区	Lángyá Qū	341102	LYV
Chuzhou city 滁州市; Chúzhōu Shì (3411 / CUZ)	Nanqiao District	南谯区	Nánqiáo Qū	341103	NQQ
Chuzhou city 滁州市; Chúzhōu Shì (3411 / CUZ)	Lai'an County	来安县	Lái'ān Xiàn	341122	LAX
Chuzhou city 滁州市; Chúzhōu Shì (3411 / CUZ)	Quanjiao County	全椒县	Quánjiāo Xiàn	341124	QJO
Chuzhou city 滁州市; Chúzhōu Shì (3411 / CUZ)	Dingyuan County	定远县	Dìngyuǎn Xiàn	341125	DYW
Chuzhou city 滁州市; Chúzhōu Shì (3411 / CUZ)	Fengyang County	凤阳县	Fèngyáng Xiàn	341126	FYG
Chuzhou city 滁州市; Chúzhōu Shì (3411 / CUZ)	Tianchang city	天长市	Tiāncháng Shì	341181	TNC
Chuzhou city 滁州市; Chúzhōu Shì (3411 / CUZ)	Mingguang city	明光市	Míngguāng Shì	341182	MGG
Fuyang city 阜阳市; Fùyáng Shì (3412 / FYS)	Yingzhou District	颍州区	Yǐngzhōu Qū	341202	YGZ
Fuyang city 阜阳市; Fùyáng Shì (3412 / FYS)	Yingdong District	颍东区	Yǐngdōng Qū	341203	YDO
Fuyang city 阜阳市; Fùyáng Shì (3412 / FYS)	Yingquan District	颍泉区	Yǐngquán Qū	341204	YQQ
Fuyang city 阜阳市; Fùyáng Shì (3412 / FYS)	Linquan County	临泉县	Línquán Xiàn	341221	LQN
Fuyang city 阜阳市; Fùyáng Shì (3412 / FYS)	Taihe County	太和县	Tàihé Xiàn	341222	TIH
Fuyang city 阜阳市; Fùyáng Shì (3412 / FYS)	Funan County	阜南县	Fùnán Xiàn	341225	FNX
Fuyang city 阜阳市; Fùyáng Shì (3412 / FYS)	Yingshang County	颍上县	Yǐngshàng Xiàn	341226	YSW
Fuyang city 阜阳市; Fùyáng Shì (3412 / FYS)	Jieshou city	界首市	Jièshǒu Shì	341282	JSW
Suzhou city 宿州市; Sùzhōu Shì (3413 / SUZ)	Yongqiao District	埇桥区	Yǒngqiáo Qū	341302	YQO
Suzhou city 宿州市; Sùzhōu Shì (3413 / SUZ)	Dangshan County	砀山县	Dàngshān Xiàn	341321	DSW
Suzhou city 宿州市; Sùzhōu Shì (3413 / SUZ)	Xiaoxian County	萧县	Xiāoxiàn	341322	XIO
Suzhou city 宿州市; Sùzhōu Shì (3413 / SUZ)	Lingbi County	灵璧县	Língbì Xiàn	341323	LBI
Suzhou city 宿州市; Sùzhōu Shì (3413 / SUZ)	Sixian County	泗县	Sìxiàn	341324	SIX
Lu'an city 六安市; Lù'ān Shì (Note: not Liù'ān) (3415 / LAW)	Jin'an District	金安区	Jīn'ān Qū	341502	JAU
Lu'an city 六安市; Lù'ān Shì (3415 / LAW)	Yu'an District	裕安区	Yù'ān Qū	341503	YAQ
Lu'an city 六安市; Lù'ān Shì (3415 / LAW)	Yeji District	叶集区	Yèjí Qū	341504	YEJ
Lu'an city 六安市; Lù'ān Shì (3415 / LAW)	Huoqiu County	霍邱县	Huòqiū Xiàn	341522	HQI
Lu'an city 六安市; Lù'ān Shì (3415 / LAW)	Shucheng County	舒城县	Shūchéng Xiàn	341523	SCW
Lu'an city 六安市; Lù'ān Shì (3415 / LAW)	Jinzhai County	金寨县	Jīnzhài Xiàn	341524	JZX
Lu'an city 六安市; Lù'ān Shì (3415 / LAW)	Huoshan County	霍山县	Huòshān Xiàn	341525	HOS
Bozhou city 亳州市; Bózhōu Shì (3416 / BOZ)	Qiaocheng District	谯城区	Qiáochéng Qū	341602	QCH
Bozhou city 亳州市; Bózhōu Shì (3416 / BOZ)	Guoyang County	涡阳县	Guōyáng Xiàn (Note: not Wōyáng)	341621	GOY
Bozhou city 亳州市; Bózhōu Shì (3416 / BOZ)	Mengcheng County	蒙城县	Méngchéng Xiàn	341622	MCX
Bozhou city 亳州市; Bózhōu Shì (3416 / BOZ)	Lixin County	利辛县	Lìxīn Xiàn	341623	LIX
Chizhou city 池州市; Chízhōu Shì (3417 / CIZ)	Guichi District	贵池区	Guìchí Qū	341702	GCI
Chizhou city 池州市; Chízhōu Shì (3417 / CIZ)	Dongzhi County	东至县	Dōngzhì Xiàn	341721	DZI
Chizhou city 池州市; Chízhōu Shì (3417 / CIZ)	Shitai County	石台县	Shítái Xiàn	341722	SHT
Chizhou city 池州市; Chízhōu Shì (3417 / CIZ)	Qingyang County	青阳县	Qīngyáng Xiàn	341723	QGY
Xuancheng city 宣城市; Xuānchéng Shì (3418 / XCI)	Xuanzhou District	宣州区	Xuānzhōu Qū	341802	XZO
Xuancheng city 宣城市; Xuānchéng Shì (3418 / XCI)	Langxi County	郎溪县	Lángxī Xiàn	341821	LGX
Xuancheng city 宣城市; Xuānchéng Shì (3418 / XCI)	Jingxian County	泾县	Jīngxiàn	341823	JXA
Xuancheng city 宣城市; Xuānchéng Shì (3418 / XCI)	Jingde County	旌德县	Jīngdé Xiàn	341824	JXW
Xuancheng city 宣城市; Xuānchéng Shì (3418 / XCI)	Jixi County	绩溪县	Jìxī Xiàn	341825	JDE
Xuancheng city 宣城市; Xuānchéng Shì (3418 / XCI)	Ningguo city	宁国市	Níngguó Shì	341881	NGU
Xuancheng city 宣城市; Xuānchéng Shì (3418 / XCI)	Guangde city	广德市	Guǎngdé shì	341882	

== Administrative divisions history ==
=== Recent changes in administrative divisions ===
Date	Before	After	Note	Reference
1980-01-29	Wuhu Prefecture	Xuancheng Prefecture	renamed	
1980-01-29	parts of Huizhou Prefecture	Xuancheng Prefecture	transferred	
1980-01-29	↳ Ningguo County	↳ Ningguo County	transferred	
1980-01-29	parts of Wuhu Prefecture	Wuhu (P-City)	transferred	
1980-01-29	↳ Wuhu County	↳ Wuhu County	transferred	
1980-01-29	Chizhou Prefecture	Anqing Prefecture	disestablished	
1980-01-29	↳ Guichi County	↳ Guichi County	transferred	
1980-01-29	↳ Dongzhi County	↳ Dongzhi County	transferred	
1980-01-29	Chizhou Prefecture	Huizhou Prefecture	disestablished	
1980-01-29	↳ Taiping County	↳ Taiping County	transferred	
1980-01-29	↳ Shitai County	↳ Shitai County	transferred	
1980-01-29	Chizhou Prefecture	Xuancheng Prefecture	disestablished	
1980-01-29	↳ Qingyang County	↳ Qingyang County	transferred	
1980-05-08	parts of Xiangshan District	Duji District	established	
1980-05-08	parts of Xiangshan District	Lieshan District	established	
1980-05-08	parts of Dongshi District	Jiao District, Bengbu	established	
1980-05-08	parts of Xishi District	Jiao District, Bengbu	established	
1980-05-08	parts of Zhongshi District	Jiao District, Bengbu	established	
1980-07-30	Xiangyang District	Tongguanshan District	renamed	
1980-07-30	Hongxing District	Shizishan District	renamed	
1980-10-03	Gugou District	Panji District	renamed	
1982-11-15	Chu County	Chuzhou (PC-City)	reorganized	
1982-11-15	parts of Chao County	Chaohu (PC-City)	reorganized	
1983-01-18	all Province-controlled city (P-City) → Prefecture-level city (PL-City)			Civil Affairs Announcement
1983-01-18	all Prefecture-controlled city (PC-City) → County-level city (CL-City)			Civil Affairs Announcement
1983-09-06	parts of Jinjiazhuang District	Jiao District, Ma'anshan	established	
1983-09-06	parts of Huashan District	Jiao District, Ma'anshan	established	
1983-09-06	parts of Yushan District	Jiao District, Ma'anshan	established	
1983-09-06	parts of Xiangshan District	Jiao District, Ma'anshan	established	
1983-10-08	parts of Chaohu Prefecture	Hefei (PL-City)	transferred	
1983-10-08	↳ Feidong County	↳ Feidong County	transferred	
1983-10-08	parts of Lu'an Prefecture	Hefei (PL-City)	transferred	
1983-10-08	↳ Feixi County	↳ Feixi County	transferred	
1983-10-08	parts of Xuancheng Prefecture	Wuhu (PL-City)	transferred	
1983-10-08	↳ Fanchang County	↳ Fanchang County	transferred	
1983-10-08	↳ Nanling County	↳ Nanling County	transferred	
1983-10-08	↳ Qingyang County	↳ Qingyang County	transferred	
1983-10-08	parts of Xuancheng Prefecture	Ma'anshan (PL-City)	transferred	
1983-10-08	↳ Dangtu County	↳ Dangtu County	transferred	
1983-10-08	parts of Suxian Prefecture	Bengbu (PL-City)	transferred	
1983-10-08	↳ Huaiyuan County	↳ Huaiyuan County	transferred	
1983-10-08	↳ Guzhen County	↳ Guzhen County	transferred	
1983-10-08	↳ Wuhe County	↳ Wuhe County	transferred	
1983-10-08	Chao County	Chaohu (CL-City)	merged into	
1983-10-08	Taiping County	Huangshan (CL-City)	reorganized	
1984-02-01	Jiao District, Huaibei	Xiangshan District	merged into	
1984-02-01	Jiao District, Huaibei	Lieshan District	merged into	
1984-02-01	Jiao District, Huaibei	Duji District	merged into	
1984-10-29	Jiao District, Ma'anshan	Xiangshan District	merged into	
1984-10-29	Siheshan District	Sihe District	renamed	
1986-03-11	Bo County	Bozhou (CL-City)	reorganized	
1987-06-10	Xuancheng County	Xuanzhou (CL-City)	reorganized	
1987-07-17	Tongshan District	Jiao District, Tongling	merged into	
1987-11-27	Huizhou Prefecture	Huangshan (PL-City)	reorganized	
1987-11-27	Tunxi (CL-City)	Tunxi District	reorganized	
1987-11-27	Huangshan (CL-City)	Huangshan District	reorganized	
1987-11-27	parts of She County	Huizhou District	established	
1988-08-17	Anqing Prefecture	Anqing (PL-City)	reorganized	
1988-08-17	parts of Anqing Prefecture	Chizhou Prefecture	established	
1988-08-17	↳ Guichi County	↳ Guichi (CL-City)	transferred & reorganized	
1988-08-17	↳ Dongzhi County	↳ Dongzhi County	transferred	
1988-08-17	↳ Shitai County	↳ Shitai County	transferred	
1988-08-17	parts of Wuhu (PL-City)	Chizhou Prefecture	established	
1988-08-17	↳ Qingyang County	↳ Qingyang County	transferred	
1989-08-17	Jieshou County	Jieshou (CL-City)	reorganized	
1990-02-28	Yuxikou District	Jiujiang District	disestablished & established	
1990-02-28	Siheshan District	Jiujiang District	disestablished & established	
1990-02-28	Jiao District, Wuhu	Jiujiang District	disestablished & established	
1992-11-20	Fuyang County	Fuyang (CL-City)	merged into	Civil Affairs [1992]152
1992-11-20	Lu'an County	Lu'an (CL-City)	merged into	Civil Affairs [1992]152
1992-11-20	Su County	Suzhou (CL-City)	merged into	Civil Affairs [1992]152
1992-12-20	Chuxian Prefecture	Chuzhou (PL-City)	reorganized	State Council [1992]201
1992-12-20	Chuzhou (CL-City)	Langya District	reorganized	State Council [1992]201
1992-12-20	Chuzhou (CL-City)	Nanqiao District	reorganized	State Council [1992]201
1993-09-18	Tianchang County	Tianchang (CL-City)	reorganized	Civil Affairs [1993]187
1994-05-31	Jiashan County	Mingguang (CL-City)	reorganized	Civil Affairs [1994]87
1996-01-01	Fuyang Prefecture	Fuyang (PL-City)	reorganized	State Council [1996]1
1996-01-01	Fuyang (CL-City)	Yingzhou District	disestablished & established	State Council [1996]1
1996-01-01	Fuyang (CL-City)	Yingdong District	disestablished & established	State Council [1996]1
1996-01-01	Fuyang (CL-City)	Yingquan District	disestablished & established	State Council [1996]1
1996-08-20	Tongcheng County	Tongcheng (CL-City)	reorganized	Civil Affairs [1996]59
1997-03-11	Ningguo County	Ningguo (CL-City)	reorganized	
1998-02-01	Fuyang (PL-City)	provincial-controlled	transferred	
1998-02-01	↳ Bozhou (CL-City)	↳ Bozhou (CL-City)	transferred	
1998-12-06	Suxian Prefecture	Suzhou (PL-City)	reorganized	
1998-12-06	Suzhou (CL-City)	Yongqiao District	reorganized	
1999-07-09	Chaohu Prefecture	Chaohu (PL-City)	reorganized	State Council [1999]80
1999-07-09	Chaohu (CL-City)	Juchao District	reorganized	State Council [1999]80
1999-09-02	Lu'an Prefecture	Lu'an (PL-City)	reorganized	State Council [1999]109
1999-09-02	Lu'an (CL-City)	Jin'an District	disestablished & established	State Council [1999]109
1999-09-02	Lu'an (CL-City)	Yu'an District	disestablished & established	State Council [1999]109
2000-05-21	provincial-controlled	Bozhou (PL-City)	established	State Council [2000]47
2000-05-21	↳ Bozhou (CL-City)	Qiaocheng District	transferred & reorganized	State Council [2000]47
2000-05-21	parts of Fuyang (PL-City)	Bozhou (PL-City)	transferred	State Council [2000]47
2000-05-21	↳ Woyang County	↳ Woyang County	transferred	State Council [2000]47
2000-05-21	↳ Mengcheng County	↳ Mengcheng County	transferred	State Council [2000]47
2000-05-21	↳ Lixin County	↳ Lixin County	transferred	State Council [2000]47
2000-06-25	Chizhou Prefecture	Chizhou (PL-City)	reorganized	State Council [2000]85
2000-06-25	Chizhou (CL-City)	Guichi District	reorganized	State Council [2000]85
2000-06-25	Xuancheng Prefecture	Xuancheng (PL-City)	reorganized	State Council [2000]87
2000-06-25	Xuanzhou (CL-City)	Xuanzhou District	reorganized	State Council [2000]87
2001-07-01	parts of Xiangshan District	Jinjiazhuang District	disestablished & merged into	State Council [2001]75
2001-07-01	parts of Xiangshan District	Huashan District	disestablished & merged into	State Council [2001]75
2001-07-01	parts of Xiangshan District	Yushan District	disestablished & merged into	State Council [2001]75
2002-02-01	Dongshi District, Hefei	Yaohai District	renamed	State Council [2002]10
2002-02-01	Zhongshi District, Hefei	Luyang District	renamed	State Council [2002]10
2002-02-01	Xishi District, Hefei	Shushan District	renamed	State Council [2002]10
2002-02-01	Shijiao District, Hefei	Baohe District	renamed	State Council [2002]10
2004-01-10	Dongshi District, Bengbu	Longzihu District	renamed	State Council [2004]4
2004-01-10	Zhongshi District, Bengbu	Bengshan District	renamed	State Council [2004]4
2004-01-10	Xishi District, Bengbu	Yuhui District	renamed	State Council [2004]4
2004-01-10	Jiao District, Bengbu	Huaishang District	renamed	State Council [2004]4
2005-05-30	Jiao District, Anqing	Yixiu District	renamed	State Council [2005]38
2005-09-30	Xinwu District	Jinghu District	merged into	State Council [2005]77
2005-09-30	parts of Matang District	Sanshan District	established	State Council [2005]77
2005-09-30	Matang District	Yijiang District	renamed	State Council [2005]77
2011-07-14	Chaohu (PL-City)	Hefei (PL-City)	disestablished & merged into	State Council [2011]84
2011-07-14	↳ Lujiang County	↳ Lujiang County	transferred	State Council [2011]84
2011-07-14	↳ Juchao District	↳ Chaohu (CL-City)	transferred & reorganized	State Council [2011]84
2011-07-14	Chaohu (PL-City)	Ma'anshan (PL-City)	disestablished & merged into	State Council [2011]84
2011-07-14	↳ Hanshan County	↳ Hanshan County	transferred	State Council [2011]84
2011-07-14	↳ He County	↳ He County	transferred	State Council [2011]84
2011-07-14	Chaohu (PL-City)	Wuhu (PL-City)	disestablished & merged into	State Council [2011]84
2011-07-14	↳ Wuwei County	↳ Wuwei County	transferred	State Council [2011]84
2012-09-17	Jinjiazhuang District	Huashan District	merged into	State Council [2012]103
2012-09-17	parts of Dangtu County	Bowang District	established	State Council [2012]103
2015-10-13	Tongguanshan District	Tongguan District	merged	State Council [2015]181
2015-10-13	Shizishan District	Tongguan District	merged	State Council [2015]181
2015-10-13	parts of Huoqiu County	Yeji District	established	State Council [2015]181
2015-10-13	parts of Anqing (PL-City)	Tongling (PL-City)	transferred	State Council [2015]181
2015-10-13	↳ Zongyang County	↳ Zongyang County	transferred	State Council [2015]181
2015-12-03	parts of Lu'an (PL-City)	Huainan (PL-City)	transferred	State Council [2015]206
2015-12-03	↳ Shou County	↳ Shou County	transferred	State Council [2015]206
2015-12-03	Tongling County	Yi'an District	reorganized	State Council [2015]206
2018-07-02	Qianshan County	Qianshan (CL-City)	reorganized	Civil Affairs [2018]104
2019-11-20	Wuwei County	Wuwei (CL-City)	reorganized	Civil Affairs [2019]125
2020-07-??	Sanshan District	Yijiang District	merged into	
2020-07-??	Wuhu County	Wanzhi District	reorganized	

== Population composition ==
=== Prefectures ===
Prefecture	2010	2000
Hefei	5,702,466	4,467,384
Anqing	5,311,000	5,180,000
Bengbu	3,164,467	3,040,605
Bozhou	4,850,657	5,078,908
Chizhou	1,402,518	1,389,469
Chuzhou	3,937,868	4,001,488
Fuyang	7,599,918	8,003,963
Huaibei	2,114,276	1,8746,00
Huainan	2,333,896	2,040,649
Huangshan	1,359,000	1,370,000
Lu'an	5,611,701	5,953,440
Ma'anshan	1,366,302	1,196,916
Suzhou	5,352,924	5,189,425
Tongling	723,958	684,600
Wuhu	2,263,123	2,115,421
Xuancheng	2,532,900	2,658,600
Chaohu (disestablished)	3,873,000	3,574,000

=== Counties ===
Name	Prefecture	2010
Yaohai	Hefei	902,830
Luyang	Hefei	609,239
Shushan	Hefei	1,022,321
Baohe	Hefei	817,686
Changfeng	Hefei	629,535
Feidong	Hefei	861,960
Feixi	Hefei	858,895
Lujiang	Hefei	973,850
Juchao → Chaohu	Hefei	780,700
Jinghu	Wuhu	533,330
Yijiang	Wuhu	309,514
Jiujiang	Wuhu	421,695
Wuhu → Wanzhi	Wuhu	294,039
Fanchang	Wuhu	257,764
Nanling	Wuhu	404,278
Wuwei	Wuhu	1,180,069
Longzihu	Bengbu	243,123
Bengshan	Bengbu	334,426
Yuhui	Bengbu	249,361
Huaishang	Bengbu	145,874
Huaiyuan	Bengbu	1,028,066
Wuhe	Bengbu	621,973
Guzhen	Bengbu	541,644
Datong	Huainan	180,917
Tianjia'an	Huainan	593,981
Xiejiaji	Huainan	320,251
Bagongshan	Huainan	175,993
Panji	Huainan	395,684
Fengtai	Huainan	667,070
Shou(xian)	Lu'an → Huainan	1,008,116
Huashan	Ma'anshan	431,859
Yushan	Ma'anshan	309,672
Bowang	Ma'anshan	169,888
Dangtu	Ma'anshan	624,771
Hanshan	Ma'anshan	376,436
He(xian)	Ma'anshan	460,161
Duji	Huaibei	324,398
Xiangshan	Huaibei	467,358
Lieshan	Huaibei	321,565
Suixi	Huaibei	1,000,955
Tongguanshan	Tongling	(not established)
Jiao(qu)	Tongling	72,301
Tongling	Tongling	249,595
Zongyang	Tongling	839,000
Yingjiang	Anqing	251,000
Daguan	Anqing	275,000
Yixiu	Anqing	254,000
Huaining	Anqing	593,000
Qianshan	Anqing	500,000
Taihu	Anqing	515,000
Susong	Anqing	571,000
Wangjiang	Anqing	527,000
Yuexi	Anqing	322,000
Tongcheng	Anqing	664,000
Tunxi	Huangshan	217,600
Huangshan	Huangshan	147,600
Huizhou	Huangshan	95,500
She(xian)	Huangshan	409,300
Xiuning	Huangshan	250,500
Yi(xian)	Huangshan	80,700
Qimen	Huangshan	157,800
Langya	Chuzhou	310427
Nanqiao	Chuzhou	251,894
Lai'an	Chuzhou	432,021
Quanjiao	Chuzhou	383,885
Dingyuan	Chuzhou	779,174
Fengyang	Chuzhou	644,895
Mingguang	Chuzhou	602,840
Tianchang	Chuzhou	532,732
Yingzhou	Fuyang	691,698
Yingdong	Fuyang	519,562
Yingquan	Fuyang	557,687
Linquan	Fuyang	1,543,218
Taihe	Fuyang	1,361,145
Funan	Fuyang	1,168,117
Yingshang	Fuyang	1,196,535
Jieshou	Fuyang	561,956
Yongqiao	Suzhou	1,647,642
Dangshan	Suzhou	800,408
Xiao(xian)	Suzhou	1,130,916
Lingbi	Suzhou	975,308
Si(xian)	Suzhou	798,650
Jin'an	Lu'an	923,938
Yu'an	Lu'an	854,645
Yeji	Lu'an	(not established)
Huoqiu	Lu'an	1,246,129
Shucheng	Lu'an	749,273
Jinzhai	Lu'an	514,456
Huoshan	Lu'an	315,144
Qiaocheng	Bozhou	1,409,436
Guoyang	Bozhou	1212054
Mengcheng	Bozhou	1,062,080
Lixin	Bozhou	1,167,087
Guichi	Chizhou	595,268
Dongzhi	Chizhou	468,280
Shitai	Chizhou	92,238
Qingyang	Chizhou	246,732
Xuanzhou	Xuancheng	772,500
Langxi	Xuancheng	320,600
Guangde	Xuancheng	487,200
Jing(xian)	Xuancheng	299,600
Jixi	Xuancheng	156100
Jingde	Xuancheng	120,000
Ningguo	Xuancheng	376,900
Tongguanshan (disestablished)	Tongling	287,765
Shizishan (disestablished)	Tongling	114,297
Sanshan (disestablished)	Wuhu	144,378
