= Yu Hui =

Yu Hui is the name of:

- Yu Hui (actress) (born 1965), Chinese actress
- Yu Hui (archer) (born 1980), Chinese Olympic archer

== See also ==
- Yuhui District, a district in Bengbu, Anhui, China
