= Gurao =

Gurao may refer to:

- Gurao, Huaibei (古饶镇), town in Lieshan District, Huaibei, Anhui, China
- Gurao, Shantou (谷饶镇), town in Chaoyang District, Shantou, Guangdong, China
