= Prefecture-level division (China) =

Second-level administrative divisions of China

Prefecture-level division 地级行政区
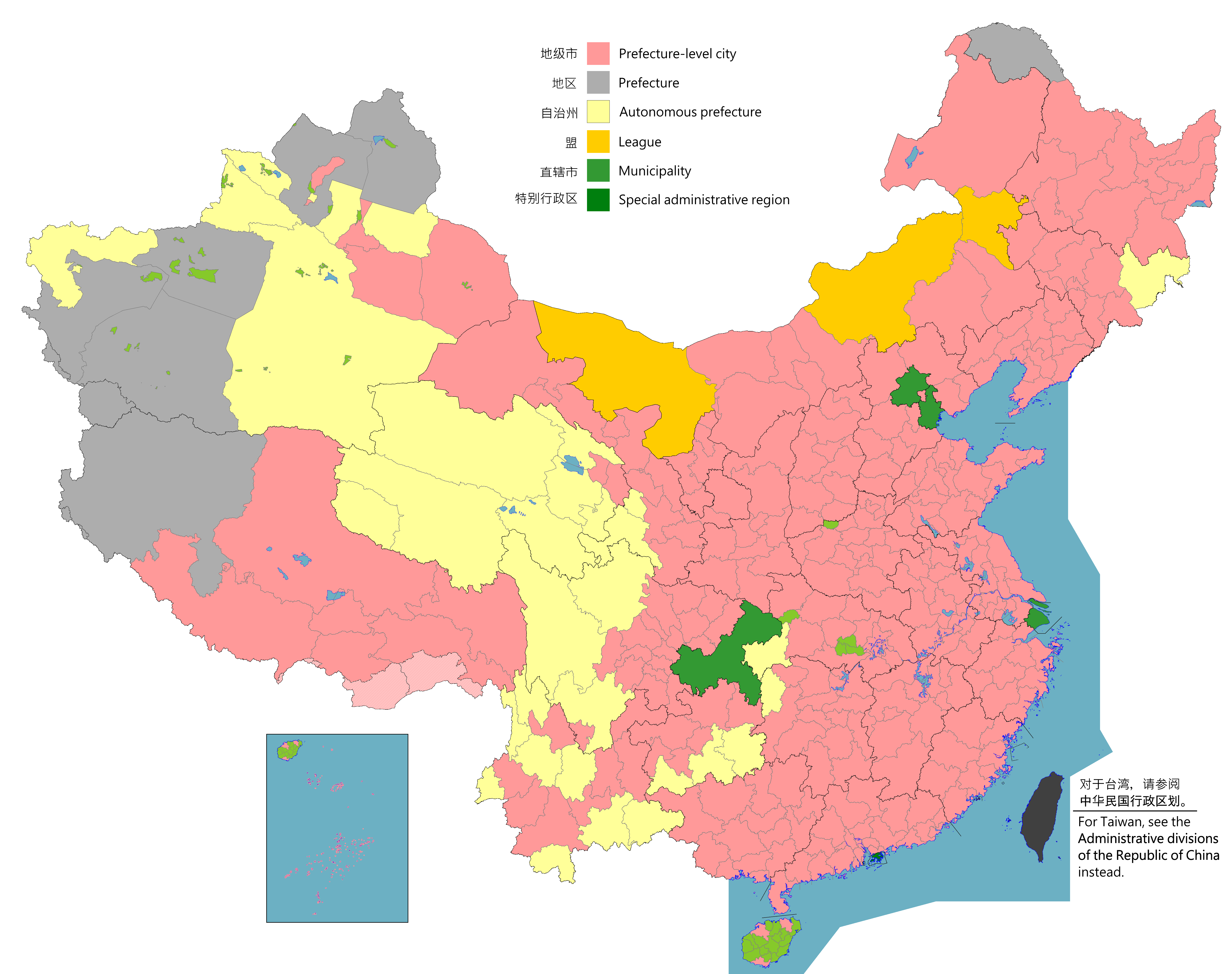
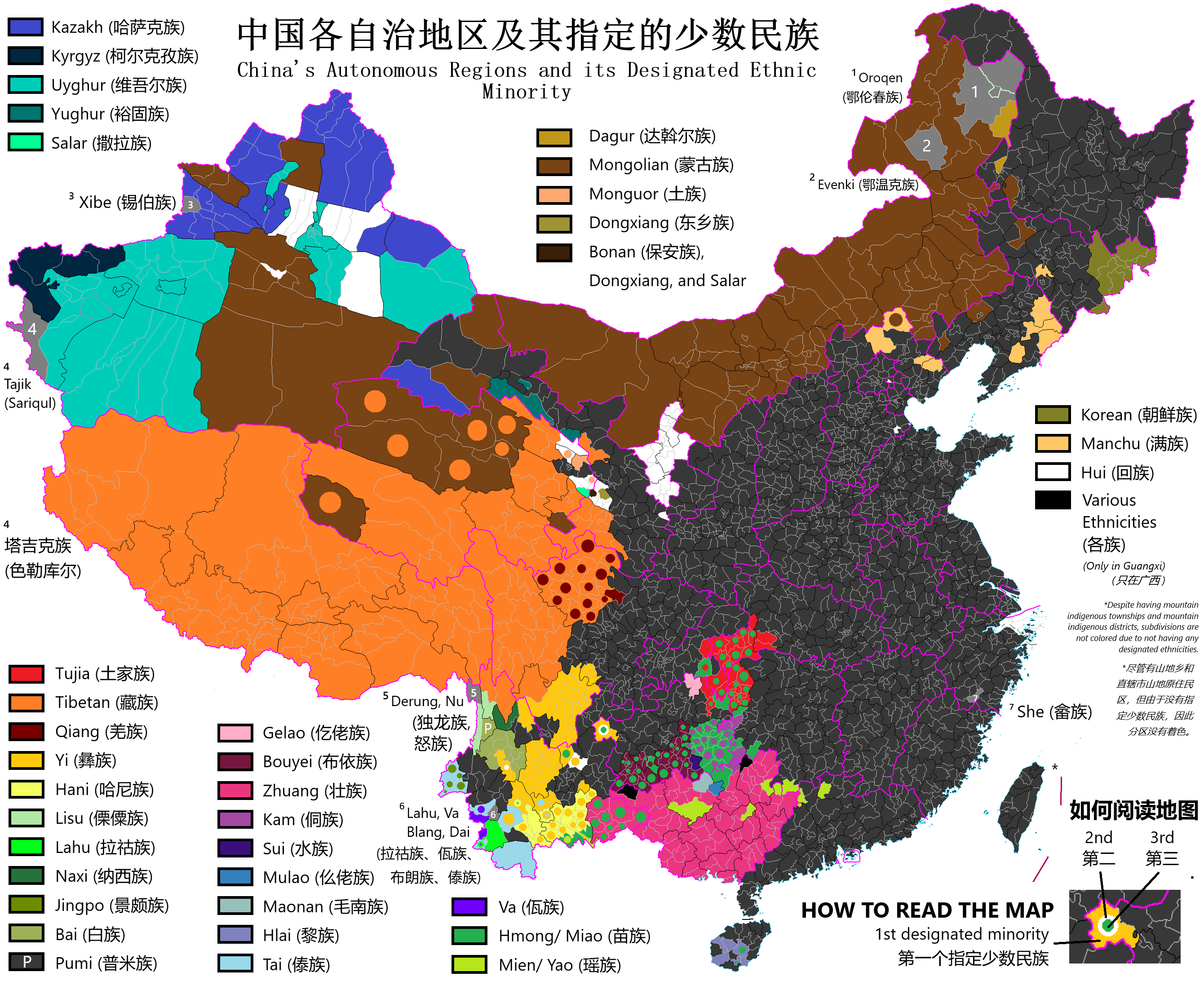
- China's Autonomous Regions and their Designated Ethnic Minority
- Category: Second level administrative division of a unitary state
- Location: China
- Number: 339 prefecture-level divisions including 6 in Taiwan Province (Note: As Taiwan is currently administered by the Republic of China, its administrative divisions differ from those in provinces administered by the People's Republic of China. The claimed official borders and divisions of the Taiwan Province of People's Republic of China mirror those of the ROC Taiwan Province before 1949. The PRC has not acknowledged any changes made post-1949 by the ROC. PRC once treated Taipei (still regarded as capital city, instead of Zhongxing New Village) and Kaohsiung as prefecture-level cities (they are actually Special municipality of Republic of China at that time), all other cities and counties as county-level cities and counties, and display them on maps as such. This is analogous to the previous practice of the ROC in producing maps depicting mainland administrative boundaries the way they were in 1949. However, this practice has also declined.)
- Populations: 444 (Sansha) – 14,047,625 (Chengdu)
- Areas: 13 km^{2} (5.0 sq mi) (Sansha) – 472,472 km^{2} (182,422 sq mi) (Bayingolin)
- Government: Various, provincial government, central government
- Subdivisions: Counties

Prefecture-level divisions
- Simplified Chinese: 地级行政区
- Traditional Chinese: 地級行政區
Transcriptions
Standard Mandarin
- Hanyu Pinyin: Dì Jí Xíngzhèngqū

China is divided into 339 prefecture-level divisions, which rank below province-level and above counties as the second-level administrative division in the country. Of these, 333 are located in territory controlled by the People's Republic of China, while 6 are located in land controlled by Taiwan.

There are four types of prefecture-level divisions:

- 299 Prefecture-level cities (293 in mainland China and 6 in the claimed Taiwan Province)
- 30 Autonomous prefectures
- 7 Prefectures
- 3 Leagues

Of these, leagues and prefectures are in the process of being abolished and transformed into one of the other two types of prefecture-level divisions.

== History ==
Modern prefectures emerged from successive attempts by Yuan Shikai and later the Nationalist Government of the Republic of China to abolish the second level of administrative divisions. When these attempts eventually failed, modern prefectures were created in 1936. Chinese provinces are relatively large by international standards, and provincial administrations have difficulty administering counties without an intermediary level of government. However, prefecture-level divisions are still not a formally recognized level of government in the same way as provinces and counties.

== Types ==
=== Prefecture-level cities ===
By far the most common type of prefecture-level division, prefecture-level cities are cities with the right to administer surrounding counties. This arrangement is known as "cities governing counties." Although there have been at least a few prefecture-level cities since the beginning of the PRC, they were relatively uncommon until the 1980s. Since then, hundreds of prefectures have been converted into prefecture-level cities. They are each headed by a People's Government, whose officials are appointed by the province but subject to approval by the local People's Congress. As with other levels of Chinese government, the People's Congress can adopt local regulations and elects a standing committee to exercise its powers when not in session.

=== Prefectures ===
Until the 1980s, the most common prefecture-level division was the prefecture, which operated as the field agencies of the provincial government. Unlike other prefecture-level governments, they do not have their own People's Governments or People's Congresses. They are instead the field agencies of the province whose role is to supervise the local county governments. However, the number of prefectures has declined rapidly since the 1980s. There are now only six prefectures left, mainly in rural areas of outlying provinces.

=== Autonomous prefectures ===
Unlike other prefecture-level divisions, autonomous prefectures are a formal part of the Chinese administrative structure. They were established in 1953 as part of a series of administrative reforms giving greater autonomy to ethnic minorities. Like leagues and prefecture-level cities, autonomous prefectures have a locally elected People's Government and People's Congress.

=== Leagues ===
Leagues are similar to autonomous prefectures but are unique to Inner Mongolia. Their numbers have been declining in recent years as most are converted to prefecture-level cities. Only three leagues remain.

== List of prefecture-level divisions ==
Notes:

- Municipalities (Beijing, Chongqing, Shanghai, & Tianjin) are not included, but their internal divisions are similar to prefectures.
- Sub-provincial cities are included, but other types of sub-provincial divisions are not.
- The six prefectures of Taiwan Province are not listed.
- * Indicates capital of province.
- Bold: indicates sub-provincial city or above.

Name	Province	Type	Population (2010)	Area (km^{2})	Prefecture Seat
Hefei*	Anhui	City	7,457,027	11,323	Shushan District
Anqing	Anhui	City	5,311,000	15,398	Daguan District
Bengbu	Anhui	City	3,164,000	5,952	Bengshan District
Bozhou	Anhui	City	4,851,000	8,394	Qiaocheng District
Chizhou	Anhui	City	1,403,000	9,423	Guichi District
Chuzhou	Anhui	City	3,938,000	13,398	Langya District
Fuyang	Anhui	City	7,600,000	13,300	Yingzhou District
Huaibei	Anhui	City	2,114,000	2,725	Xiangshan District
Huainan	Anhui	City	3,342,000	5,533	Tianjia'an District
Huangshan	Anhui	City	1,359,000	9,807	Tunxi District
Lu'an	Anhui	City	4,610,000	15,447	Jin'an District
Ma'anshan	Anhui	City	1,366,000	1,686	Yushan District
Suzhou, Anhui	Anhui	City	5,353,000	9,939	Yongqiao District
Tongling	Anhui	City	724,000	1,113	Tongguanshan District
Wuhu	Anhui	City	2,263,000	3,317	Jiujiang District
Xuancheng	Anhui	City	2,533,000	12,340	Xuanzhou District
Fuzhou, Fujian*	Fujian	City	7,115,370	12,000	Gulou District
**Xiamen**	Fujian	City	3,531,347	1,573	Siming District
Longyan	Fujian	City	2,559,545	19,069	Xinluo District
Nanping	Fujian	City	2,645,549	26,300	Yanping District
Ningde	Fujian	City	2,821,996	13,452	Jiaocheng District
Putian	Fujian	City	2,778,508	4,200	Chengxiang District
Quanzhou	Fujian	City	8,128,530	11,015	Fengze District
Sanming	Fujian	City	2,503,388	22,929	Meilie District
Zhangzhou	Fujian	City	4,809,983	12,607	Xiangcheng District
Jiuquan	Gansu	City	1,095,947	191,342	Suzhou District
Jiayuguan	Gansu	City	231,853	1,133	Xiongguan District
Zhangye	Gansu	City	1,199,515	16,216	Ganzhou District
Jinchang	Gansu	City	464,050	8,896	Jinchuan District
Wuwei	Gansu	City	1,815,054	33,000	Liangzhou District
Baiyin	Gansu	City	1,708,751	8,185	Baiyin District
Lanzhou*	Gansu	City	3,616,163	13,100	Chengguan District
Gannan	Gansu	Autonomous prefecture (Tibetan)	689,132	40,898	Hezuo City
Dingxi	Gansu	City	2,698,622	7,837	Anding District
Linxia	Gansu	Autonomous prefecture (Hui)	1,946,677	8,169	Linxia City
Longnan	Gansu	City	2,567,718	27,000	Wudu District
Tianshui	Gansu	City	3,262,548	14,300	Qinzhou District
Pingliang	Gansu	City	2,068,033	11,325	Kongtong District
Qingyang	Gansu	City	2,211,191	10,470	Xifeng District
Qingyuan	Guangdong	City	3,698,394	19,000	Qingcheng District
Shaoguan	Guangdong	City	2,826,612	18,645	Zhenjiang District
Heyuan	Guangdong	City	2,953,019	15,478	Yuancheng District
Meizhou	Guangdong	City	4,240,139	15,836	Meijiang District
Chaozhou	Guangdong	City	2,669,844	3,614	Xiangqiao District
Zhaoqing	Guangdong	City	3,918,085	22,322	Duanzhou District
Yunfu	Guangdong	City	2,360,128	7,813	Yuncheng District
Foshan	Guangdong	City	7,194,311	3,813	Chancheng District
**Guangzhou***	Guangdong	City	12,700,800	7,434	Yuexiu District
Dongguan	Guangdong	City	8,220,237	2,465	Nancheng District
Huizhou	Guangdong	City	4,597,002	11,158	Huicheng District
Shanwei	Guangdong	City	2,935,717	5,271	Cheng District
Jieyang	Guangdong	City	5,877,025	5,240	Rongcheng District
Shantou	Guangdong	City	5,391,028	2,064	Jinping District
Zhanjiang	Guangdong	City	6,993,304	12,490	Chikan District
Maoming	Guangdong	City	5,817,753	11,458	Maonan District
Yangjiang	Guangdong	City	2,421,812	7,813	Jiangcheng District
Jiangmen	Guangdong	City	4,448,871	9,443	Pengjiang District
Zhongshan	Guangdong	City	3,120,884	1,800	Dong District
Zhuhai	Guangdong	City	1,560,229	1,653	Xiangzhou District
**Shenzhen**	Guangdong	City	10,357,938	2,050	Futian District
Baise	Guangxi	City	3,466,800	36,252	Youjiang District
Hechi	Guangxi	City	3,369,200	13,706	Jinchengjiang District
Liuzhou	Guangxi	City	3,758,700	16,877	Liubei District
Guilin	Guangxi	City	4,748,000	27,809	Lingui District
Hezhou	Guangxi	City	1,954,100	11,854	Babu District
Chongzuo	Guangxi	City	1,994,300	17,345	Jiangzhou District
Nanning*	Guangxi	City	6,661,600	22,293	Qingxiu District
Laibin	Guangxi	City	2,099,700	13,400	Xingbin District
Guigang	Guangxi	City	4,118,800	10,595	Gangbei District
Wuzhou	Guangxi	City	2,882,200	12,588	Changzhou District
Fangchenggang	Guangxi	City	866,900	2,386	Gangkou District
Qinzhou	Guangxi	City	3,079,700	5,250	Qinbei District
Beihai	Guangxi	City	1,539,300	1,288	Haicheng District
Yulin, Guangxi	Guangxi	City	5,487,400	12,839	Yuzhou District
Bijie	Guizhou	City	6,536,370	26,853	Qixingguan District
Zunyi	Guizhou	City	6,127,009	11,877	Huichuan District
Tongren	Guizhou	City	3,092,365	18,006	Bijiang District
Liupanshui	Guizhou	City	2,851,180	9,926	Zhongshan District
Anshun	Guizhou	City	2,297,339	9,269	Xixiu District
Guiyang*	Guizhou	City	4,324,561	8,034	Guanshanhu District
Qianxinan	Guizhou	Autonomous prefecture (Buyei & Miao)	2,805,857	16,804	Xingyi City
Qiannan	Guizhou	Autonomous prefecture (Buyei & Miao)	3,231,161	26,207	Duyun City
Qiandongnan	Guizhou	Autonomous prefecture (Miao & Dong)	3,480,626	30,339	Kaili City
Danzhou	Hainan	City	932,362	3,400	Nada Town
Haikou*	Hainan	City	2,046,189	2,304	Longhua District
Sanya	Hainan	City	685,408	1,919	Jiyang District
Sansha	Hainan	City	444	13	Xisha District (Xisha Islands)
Shijiazhuang*	Hebei	City	9,547,869	14,771	Chang'an District
Baoding	Hebei	City	10,029,197	20,911	Xinshi District
Cangzhou	Hebei	City	7,134,053	14,383	Yunhe District
Chengde	Hebei	City	3,473,197	39,519	Shuangqiao District
Handan	Hebei	City	9,174,679	12,068	Congtai District
Hengshui	Hebei	City	4,340,773	8,815	Taocheng District
Langfang	Hebei	City	4,358,839	6,417	Guangyang District
Qinhuangdao	Hebei	City	2,987,605	7,812	Haigang District
Tangshan	Hebei	City	7,577,284	17,040	Lubei District
Xingtai	Hebei	City	7,104,114	12,486	Qiaodong District
Zhangjiakou	Hebei	City	4,345,491	36,947	Qiaoxi District
**Harbin***	Heilongjiang	City	10,635,971	53,068	Songbei District
Daqing	Heilongjiang	City	2,904,532	8,556	Sartu District
Hegang	Heilongjiang	City	1,058,665	14,784	Xiangyang District
Heihe	Heilongjiang	City	1,673,898	54,390	Aihui District
Jiamusi	Heilongjiang	City	2,552,097	12,173	Jiao District
Jixi	Heilongjiang	City	1,862,161	22,351	Jiguan District
Mudanjiang	Heilongjiang	City	2,798,723	40,435	Dong'an District
Qiqihar	Heilongjiang	City	5,367,003	42,469	Jianhua District
Qitaihe	Heilongjiang	City	920,419	6,221	Taoshan District
Shuangyashan	Heilongjiang	City	1,462,626	10,225	Jianshan District
Suihua	Heilongjiang	City	5,416,439	13,595	Beilin District
Yichun, Heilongjiang	Heilongjiang	City	1,148,126	15,064	Yichun District
Daxing'anling	Heilongjiang	Prefecture	511,564	46,755	Jiagedaqi District
Zhengzhou*	Henan	City	8,626,505	7,446	Zhongyuan District
Anyang	Henan	City	5,172,834	7,355	Wenfeng District
Hebi	Henan	City	1,569,100	2,182	Qibin District
Jiaozuo	Henan	City	3,539,860	4,071	Jiefang District
Kaifeng	Henan	City	4,676,159	6,444	Gulou District
Luohe	Henan	City	2,544,103	2,617	Yancheng District
Luoyang	Henan	City	6,549,486	15,208	Luolong District
Nanyang	Henan	City	10,263,006	26,600	Wolong District
Pingdingshan	Henan	City	4,904,367	7,882	Xinhua District
Puyang	Henan	City	3,598,494	4,188	Hualong District
Sanmenxia	Henan	City	2,233,872	10,496	Hubin District
Shangqiu	Henan	City	7,362,472	10,704	Liangyuan District
Xinxiang	Henan	City	5,707,801	8,169	Weibin District
Xinyang	Henan	City	6,108,683	18,819	Shihe District
Xuchang	Henan	City	4,307,199	4,996	Weidu District
Zhoukou	Henan	City	8,953,172	11,959	Chuanhui District
Zhumadian	Henan	City	7,230,744	15,083	Yicheng District
**Wuhan***	Hubei	City	9,785,392	8,494	Jiang'an District
Ezhou	Hubei	City	1,048,672	1,504	Echeng District
Huanggang	Hubei	City	6,162,072	17,446	Huangzhou District
Huangshi	Hubei	City	2,429,318	4,630	Xialu District
Jingmen	Hubei	City	2,873,687	12,404	Dongbao District
Jingzhou	Hubei	City	5,691,707	14,067	Shashi District
Shiyan	Hubei	City	3,340,843	23,600	Maojian District
Suizhou	Hubei	City	2,162,222	9,636	Zengdu District
Xiangyang	Hubei	City	5,500,307	19,700	Xiangcheng District
Xianning	Hubei	City	2,462,583	9,861	Xian'an District
Xiaogan	Hubei	City	4,814,542	8,910	Xiaonan District
Yichang	Hubei	City	4,059,686	21,227	Xiling District
Enshi	Hubei	Autonomous prefecture (Tujia & Miao)	3,290,294	9,266	Enshi City
Changsha*	Hunan	City	7,044,118	11,820	Yuelu District
Changde	Hunan	City	5,747,218	18,189	Wuling District
Chenzhou	Hunan	City	4,581,778	19,317	Beihu District
Hengyang	Hunan	City	7,141,462	15,310	Zhengxiang District
Huaihua	Hunan	City	4,741,948	27,600	Hecheng District
Loudi	Hunan	City	3,785,627	8,107	Louxing District
Shaoyang	Hunan	City	7,071,826	20,829	Daxiang District
Xiangtan	Hunan	City	2,748,552	5,015	Yuetang District
Yiyang	Hunan	City	4,313,084	12,144	Heshan District
Yongzhou	Hunan	City	5,180,235	22,255	Lengshuitan District
Yueyang	Hunan	City	5,477,911	5,799	Yueyanglou District
Zhangjiajie	Hunan	City	1,476,521	9,516	Yongding District
Zhuzhou	Hunan	City	3,855,609	11,262	Tianyuan District
Xiangxi	Hunan	Autonomous Prefecture (Tujia & Miao)	2,547,833	15,486	Jishou City
Alxa	Inner Mongolia	League	231,334	267,574	Bayanhot Elute Subdistrict, Alxa Left Banner
Bayannur	Inner Mongolia	City	1,669,915	65,788	Linhe District
Wuhai	Inner Mongolia	City	532,902	1,754	Haibowan District
Ordos	Inner Mongolia	City	1,940,653	87,000	Dongsheng District
Baotou	Inner Mongolia	City	2,650,364	27,768	Hondlon District
Hohhot*	Inner Mongolia	City	2,866,615	17,224	Xincheng District
Ulanqab	Inner Mongolia	City	2,143,590	54,491	Jining District
Xilingol	Inner Mongolia	League	1,028,022	202,580	Xilinhot City
Chifeng	Inner Mongolia	City	4,341,245	90,275	Hongshan District
Tongliao	Inner Mongolia	City	3,139,153	59,535	Horqin District
Hinggan	Inner Mongolia	League	1,613,250	59,806	Ulanhot City
Hulunbuir	Inner Mongolia	City	2,549,278	263,953	Hailar District
**Nanjing***	Jiangsu	City	8,004,680	6,598	Xuanwu District
Changzhou	Jiangsu	City	4,591,972	4,385	Xinbei District
Huai'an	Jiangsu	City	4,799,889	10,072	Qinghe District
Lianyungang	Jiangsu	City	4,393,914	7,444	Xinpu District
Nantong	Jiangsu	City	7,282,835	8,001	Chongchuan District
Suqian	Jiangsu	City	4,715,553	8,555	Sucheng District
Suzhou, Jiangsu	Jiangsu	City	10,465,994	8,488	Gusu District
Taizhou, Jiangsu	Jiangsu	City	4,618,558	5,790	Hailing District
Wuxi	Jiangsu	City	6,372,624	4,787	Binhu District
Xuzhou	Jiangsu	City	8,580,500	11,258	Yunlong District
Yancheng	Jiangsu	City	7,260,240	16,920	Tinghu District
Yangzhou	Jiangsu	City	4,459,760	6,658	Guangling District
Zhenjiang	Jiangsu	City	3,113,384	3,847	Runzhou District
Nanchang*	Jiangxi	City	5,042,565	7,402	Donghu District
Fuzhou, Jiangxi	Jiangxi	City	3,912,312	7,258	Linchuan District
Ganzhou	Jiangxi	City	8,368,440	39,400	Zhanggong District
Ji'an	Jiangxi	City	4,810,340	25,300	Jizhou District
Jingdezhen	Jiangxi	City	1,587,477	5,256	Changjiang District
Jiujiang	Jiangxi	City	4,728,763	18,823	Xunyang District
Pingxiang	Jiangxi	City	1,854,510	1,477	Anyuan District
Shangrao	Jiangxi	City	6,579,714	22,791	Xinzhou District
Xinyu	Jiangxi	City	1,138,873	1,227	Yushui District
Yichun, Jiangxi	Jiangxi	City	5,419,575	7,208	Yuanzhou District
Yingtan	Jiangxi	City	1,124,906	7,208	Yuehu District
**Changchun***	Jilin	City	7,677,089	20,532	Chaoyang District
Baicheng	Jilin	City	2,033,058	25,683	Taobei District
Baishan	Jilin	City	1,295,750	17,485	Hunjiang District
Jilin	Jilin	City	4,414,681	27,700	Chuanying District
Liaoyuan	Jilin	City	1,176,645	5,125	Longshan District
Siping	Jilin	City	3,386,325	14,323	Tiexi District
Songyuan	Jilin	City	2,881,082	22,000	Ningjiang District
Tonghua	Jilin	City	2,325,242	15,195	Dongchang District
Yanbian	Jilin	Autonomous Prefecture (Korean)	2,271,600	43,509	Yanji City
**Shenyang***	Liaoning	City	8,106,171	12,924	Shenhe District
**Dalian**	Liaoning	City	6,690,432	13,237	Xigang District
Anshan	Liaoning	City	3,645,884	9,252	Tiedong District
Benxi	Liaoning	City	1,709,538	8,411	Pingshan District
Chaoyang	Liaoning	City	3,044,641	19,698	Shuangta District
Dandong	Liaoning	City	2,444,697	14,981	Zhenxing District
Fushun	Liaoning	City	2,138,090	10,816	Shuncheng District
Fuxin	Liaoning	City	1,819,339	10,445	Xihe District
Huludao	Liaoning	City	2,623,541	10,415	Longgang District
Jinzhou	Liaoning	City	3,126,463	10,111	Taihe District
Liaoyang	Liaoning	City	1,858,768	4,731	Baita District
Panjin	Liaoning	City	1,392,493	4,071	Xinglongtai District
Tieling	Liaoning	City	2,717,732	13,000	Yinzhou District
Yingkou	Liaoning	City	2,428,534	5,402	Zhanqian District
Yinchuan*	Ningxia	City	1,993,088	4,467	Jinfeng District
Shizuishan	Ningxia	City	725,482	5,209	Dawukou District
Wuzhong	Ningxia	City	1,273,792	20,733	Litong District
Zhongwei	Ningxia	City	1,080,832	16,986	Shapotou District
Guyuan	Ningxia	City	1,228,156	14,412	Yuanzhou District
Haixi	Qinghai	Autonomous prefecture (Mongol & Tibetan)	489,338	325,785	Delingha
Haibei	Qinghai	Autonomous prefecture (Tibetan)	273,304	34,700	Sanjiaocheng Town, Haiyan County
Xining*	Qinghai	City	2,208,708	7,372	Chengzhong District
Haidong	Qinghai	City	1,396,846	12,810	Ledu District
Hainan	Qinghai	Autonomous prefecture (Tibetan)	441,689	46,000	Qabqa Town, Gonghe County
Huangnan	Qinghai	Autonomous prefecture (Tibetan)	256,716	17,921	Rongwo Town, Tongren County
Yushu	Qinghai	Autonomous prefecture (Tibetan)	378,439	188,794	Yushu City
Golog	Qinghai	Autonomous prefecture (Tibetan)	181,682	76,312	Dawu Town, Maqên County
**Xi'an***	Shaanxi	City	8,467,837	9,983	Weiyang District
Ankang	Shaanxi	City	2,629,906	23,529	Hanbin District
Baoji	Shaanxi	City	3,716,731	18,712	Jintai District
Hanzhong	Shaanxi	City	3,416,196	27,246	Hantai District
Shangluo	Shaanxi	City	2,341,742	19,292	Shangzhou District
Tongchuan	Shaanxi	City	834,437	3,882	Yaozhou District
Weinan	Shaanxi	City	5,286,077	13,000	Linwei District
Xianyang	Shaanxi	City	4,894,834	10,196	Qindu District
Yan'an	Shaanxi	City	2,187,009	37,000	Baota District
Yulin, Shaanxi	Shaanxi	City	3,351,437	43,578	Yuyang District
**Jinan***	Shandong	City	6,814,000	8,177	Lixia District
**Qingdao**	Shandong	City	8,715,100	10,654	Shinan District
Binzhou	Shandong	City	3,748,500	9,444	Bincheng District
Dezhou	Shandong	City	5,568,200	10,356	Decheng District
Dongying	Shandong	City	2,035,300	7,923	Dongying District
Heze	Shandong	City	8,287,800	12,238	Mudan District
Jining	Shandong	City	8,081,900	10,685	Shizhong District
Liaocheng	Shandong	City	5,789,900	8,715	Dongchangfu District
Linyi	Shandong	City	10,039,400	17,251	Lanshan District
Rizhao	Shandong	City	2,801,100	5,310	Donggang District
Tai'an	Shandong	City	5,494,200	7,762	Taishan District
Weifang	Shandong	City	9,086,200	15,800	Kuiwen District
Weihai	Shandong	City	2,804,800	5,436	Huancui District
Yantai	Shandong	City	6,968,200	13,739	Laishan District
Zaozhuang	Shandong	City	3,729,300	4,550	Shizhong District
Zibo	Shandong	City	4,530,600	5,938	Zhangdian District
Taiyuan*	Shanxi	City	4,201,591	6,956	Xinghualing District
Changzhi	Shanxi	City	3,334,564	13,864	Cheng District
Datong	Shanxi	City	3,318,057	14,176	Cheng District
Jincheng	Shanxi	City	2,279,151	9,484	Cheng District
Jinzhong	Shanxi	City	3,249,425	16,408	Yuci District
Linfen	Shanxi	City	4,316,612	20,275	Yaodu District
Lüliang	Shanxi	City	3,727,057	21,000	Lishi District
Shuozhou	Shanxi	City	1,714,857	5,737	Shuocheng District
Xinzhou	Shanxi	City	3,067,501	25,180	Xinfu District
Yangquan	Shanxi	City	1,368,502	4,452	Cheng District
Yuncheng	Shanxi	City	5,134,794	14,106	Yanhu District
Garzê	Sichuan	Autonomous prefecture (Tibetan)	1,091,872	151,078	Kangding City
Ngawa	Sichuan	Autonomous prefecture (Tibetan & Qiang)	898,713	83,201	Barkam Town, Barkam County
Mianyang	Sichuan	City	4,613,862	20,249	Fucheng District
Guangyuan	Sichuan	City	2,484,123	16,313	Lizhou District
Nanchong	Sichuan	City	6,278,622	12,479	Shunqing District
Bazhong	Sichuan	City	3,283,771	12,301	Bazhou District
Dazhou	Sichuan	City	5,468,092	16,591	Tongchuan District
Ya'an	Sichuan	City	1,507,264	15,300	Yucheng District
**Chengdu***	Sichuan	City	14,047,625	12,390	Qingyang District
Deyang	Sichuan	City	3,615,759	5,818	Jingyang District
Suining	Sichuan	City	3,252,551	5,326	Chuanshan District
Guang'an	Sichuan	City	3,205,476	6,344	Guang'an District
Meishan	Sichuan	City	2,950,548	7,186	Dongpo District
Ziyang	Sichuan	City	3,665,064	7,962	Yanjiang District
Leshan	Sichuan	City	3,235,756	12,826	Shizhong District
Neijiang	Sichuan	City	3,702,847	5,386	Shizhong District
Zigong	Sichuan	City	2,678,898	4,372	Ziliujing District
Yibin	Sichuan	City	4,472,001	13,283	Cuiping District
Luzhou	Sichuan	City	4,218,426	12,247	Jiangyang District
Liangshan	Sichuan	Autonomous prefecture (Yi)	4,532,809	60,423	Xichang City
Panzhihua	Sichuan	City	1,214,121	7,440	Dong District
Ngari	Tibet	Prefecture	95,465	304,683	Sênggêzangbo Town, Gar County
Nagqu	Tibet	City	462,382	450,537	Nagqu Town, Nagqu County
Qamdo	Tibet	City	657,505	110,154	Karub District
Xigazê	Tibet	City	703,292	182,000	Samzhubzê District
Lhasa*	Tibet	City	559,423	31,662	Chingoin District
Lhoka	Tibet	City	328,990	79,699	Zêtang Town, Nêdong County
Nyingchi	Tibet	City	195,109	116,175	Bayi District
Altay (Note: Ili (itself a prefecture with sub-provincial status) contains 2 other prefectures: Tacheng and Altay. Ili also directly controls 2 county-level cities, 7 counties, and 1 autonomous county, like a normal prefecture does. Tacheng and Altay is counted in Xinjiang's total number of prefectures here.)	Xinjiang	Prefecture	603,280	117,988	Altay City
Bortala	Xinjiang	Autonomous prefecture (Mongol)	443,680	24,896	Bole (Börtala) City
Tarbaĝatay	Xinjiang	Prefecture	1,219,212	94,891	Tacheng (Qoqek) City
Karamay	Xinjiang	City	391,008	7,734	Karamay District
Changji	Xinjiang	Autonomous prefecture (Hui)	1,428,592	73,659	Changji (Sanji) City
Ürümqi*	Xinjiang	City	3,110,280	14,217	Tianshan District
Turpan	Xinjiang	City	622,679	69,620	Gaochang District
Hami	Xinjiang	City	572,400	138,919	Yizhou District
**Ili**	Xinjiang	Autonomous prefecture (Kazakh)	2,482,627	269,502	Yining (Ĝulja) City
Kizilsu	Xinjiang	Autonomous prefecture (Kirgiz)	525,599	70,916	Atux City
Kashgar	Xinjiang	Prefecture	3,979,362	112,058	Kashi (Kashgar) City
Aksu	Xinjiang	Prefecture	2,370,887	128,099	Aksu City
Hotan	Xinjiang	Prefecture	2,014,365	248,946	Hotan City
Bayingolin	Xinjiang	Autonomous prefecture (Mongol)	1,278,492	472,472	Korla City
Kunming*	Yunnan	City	6,432,000	21,473	Chenggong District
Qujing	Yunnan	City	5,855,000	28,904	Qilin District
Yuxi	Yunnan	City	2,304,000	15,285	Hongta District
Baoshan	Yunnan	City	2,506,000	19,040	Longyang District
Zhaotong	Yunnan	City	5,213,000	23,192	Zhaoyang District
Lijiang	Yunnan	City	1,245,000	21,219	Gucheng District
Pu'er	Yunnan	City	2,543,000	45,385	Simao District
Lincang	Yunnan	City	2,430,000	24,469	Linxiang District
Dehong	Yunnan	Autonomous prefecture (Dai & Jingpo)	1,211,000	11,526	Mangshi
Nujiang	Yunnan	Autonomous prefecture (Lisu)	534,000	14,703	Liuku Town, Lushui County
Dêqên	Yunnan	Autonomous prefecture (Tibetan)	400,000	23,870	Shangri-La City
Dali	Yunnan	Autonomous prefecture (Bai)	3,456,000	29,459	Dali City
Chuxiong	Yunnan	Autonomous prefecture (Yi)	2,684,000	29,256	Chuxiong City
Honghe	Yunnan	Autonomous prefecture (Hani & Yi)	4,501,000	32,929	Mengzi City
Wenshan	Yunnan	Autonomous prefecture (Zhuang & Miao)	3,518,000	32,239	Wenshan City
Xishuangbanna	Yunnan	Autonomous prefecture (Dai)	1,134,000	19,700	Jinghong City
**Hangzhou***	Zhejiang	City	8,700,400	16,847	Jianggan District
**Ningbo**	Zhejiang	City	7,605,700	9,365	Yinzhou District
Huzhou	Zhejiang	City	2,893,500	5,818	Wuxing District
Jiaxing	Zhejiang	City	4,501,700	3,915	Nanhu District
Jinhua	Zhejiang	City	5,361,600	10,918	Wucheng District
Lishui	Zhejiang	City	2,117,000	17,298	Liandu District
Quzhou	Zhejiang	City	2,122,700	8,846	Kecheng District
Shaoxing	Zhejiang	City	4,912,200	8,256	Yuecheng District
Taizhou, Zhejiang	Zhejiang	City	5,968,800	9,411	Jiaojiang District
Wenzhou	Zhejiang	City	9,122,100	11,784	Lucheng District
Zhoushan	Zhejiang	City	1,121,300	1,440	Dinghai District

== See also ==
- Administrative divisions of China
- Prefecture-level city
- Leagues in China
- Prefectures in China
- Autonomous prefecture

== Sources ==
=== Bibliography ===
- Government Affairs Division (31 December 2020). National administrative division information query platform (Map) (in Chinese). Ministry of Civil Affairs of the People's Republic of China.
- Guo, Rongxing (2017). How the Chinese Economy Works (4th Revised ed.). Palgrave Macmillan.
- Sun, Caihong (2020). "The Relationship between Central and Local Authorities in China". In Fang, Ning (ed.). China's Political System. Translated by Fu, Yili. Singapore: Springer Nature & Chinese Social Sciences Press. pp. 91–124.
- Goodman, David S.G. (2015). Handbook of the Politics of China. Northampton, Massachusetts: Edward Elgar Publishing Limited.
- Zhang, Li; LeGates, Richard; Zhao, Min (2016). Understanding China's Urbanization: The Great Demographic, Spatial, Economic, and Social Transformation. Northampton, Massachusetts: Edward Elgar Publishing Limited.
- Saich, Tony (2015). Governance and Politics of China (Fourth ed.). New York: Palgrave Macmillan.
- Chung, Jae Ho; Lam, Chiu (2010). China's Local Administration: Traditions and Changes in the Sub-National Hierarchy. New York: Routledge.
- Fitzgerald, John (2002). Rethinking China's Provinces. New York: Routledge.
