= Gangzha District =

Gangzha 港闸区 (Chinese)
- District
- Location in Jiangsu
- Coordinates: 32°03′56″N 120°49′40″E
- Country: People's Republic of China
- Province: Jiangsu
- Prefecture-level city: Nantong

Area
  - Total: 134 km^{2} (52 sq mi)

Population (2014)
  - Total: 278,000
  - Density: 2,070/km^{2} (5,370/sq mi)
- Time zone: UTC+8 (China Standard)
- Postal code: 216002

Gangzha District (simplified Chinese: 港闸区; traditional Chinese: 港閘區; pinyin: Gǎngzhá Qū) is a former district of Nantong, Jiangsu province, China. In July 2020, it was merged into Chongchuan District.

The district had an area of 134 kilometres (83 mi) and the population was around 180,000 in 2001.

== Administrative divisions ==
Before being merged into Chongchuan District in July 2020, Gangzha District has 6 subdistricts.

- Yongxing (永兴街道)
- Tangzhazhen (唐闸镇街道)
- Tianshenggangzhen (天生港镇街道)
- Qinzao (秦灶街道)
- Chenqiao (陈桥街道)
- Xingfu (幸福街道)
