= Xiejiaji, Huainan =

Xiejiaji 谢家集区
- District
- Interactive map of Xiejiaji
- Coordinates: 32°36′00″N 116°51′32″E
- Country: China
- Province: Anhui
- Prefecture-level city: Huainan
- District seat: Pingshan Subdistrict

Area
  - Total: 275.7 km^{2} (106.4 sq mi)

Population (2020)
  - Total: 221,589
  - Density: 803.7/km^{2} (2,082/sq mi)
- Time zone: UTC+8 (China Standard)
- Postal code: 232000

Xiejiaji District (simplified Chinese: 谢家集区; traditional Chinese: 謝家集區; pinyin: Xièjiājí Qū) is a district of the city of Huainan, Anhui Province, China.

== Administrative divisions ==
In the present, Xiejiaji District has 5 subdistricts, 4 towns, 1 township and 1 ethnic township.

5 Subdistricts

- Xiejiaji (谢家集街道)
- Caijiagang (蔡家岗街道)
- Lixin (立新街道)
- Pingshan (平山街道)
- Xiesancun (谢三村街道)

4 Towns

- Wangfenggang (望峰岗镇)
- Liyingzi (李郢孜镇)
- Tangshan (唐山镇)
- Yanggong (杨公镇)

1 Township

- Sunmiao (孙庙乡)

1 Ethnic township

- Gudui Hui Ethnic Township (孤堆回族乡)
