= Huangshan District =

Huangshan 黄山区
- District
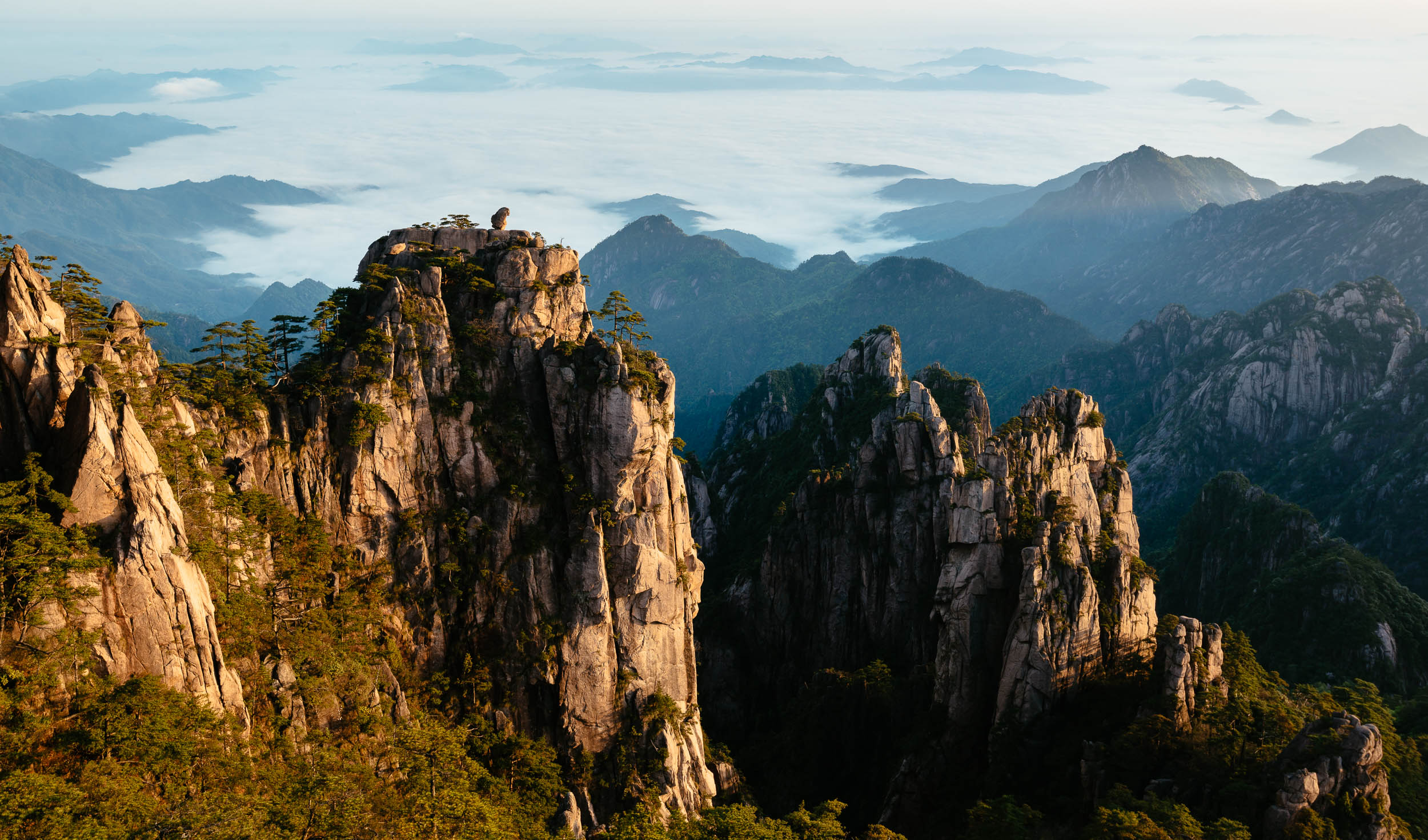
- Huangshan

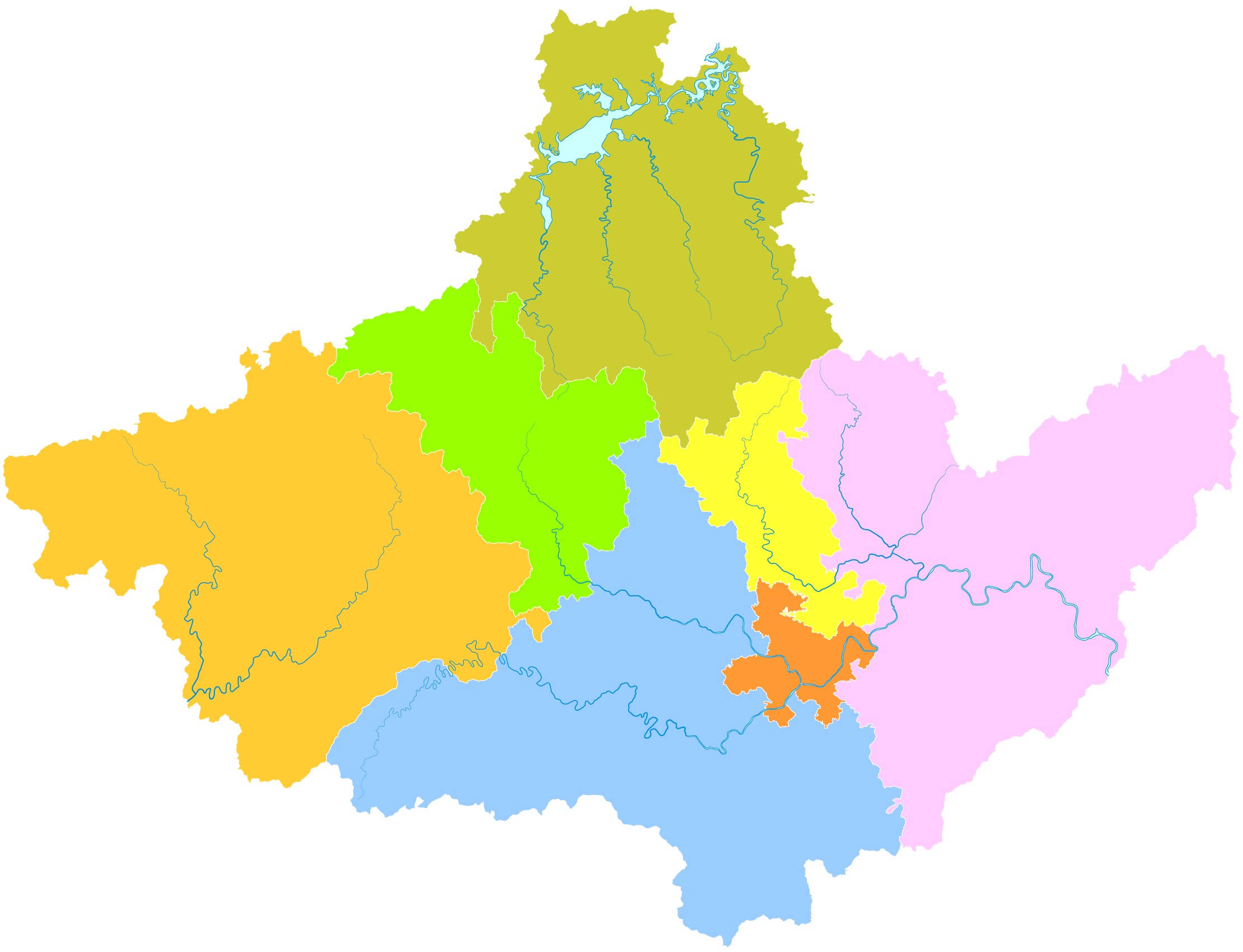
- Huangshan District is the northernmost division in this map of Huangshan City

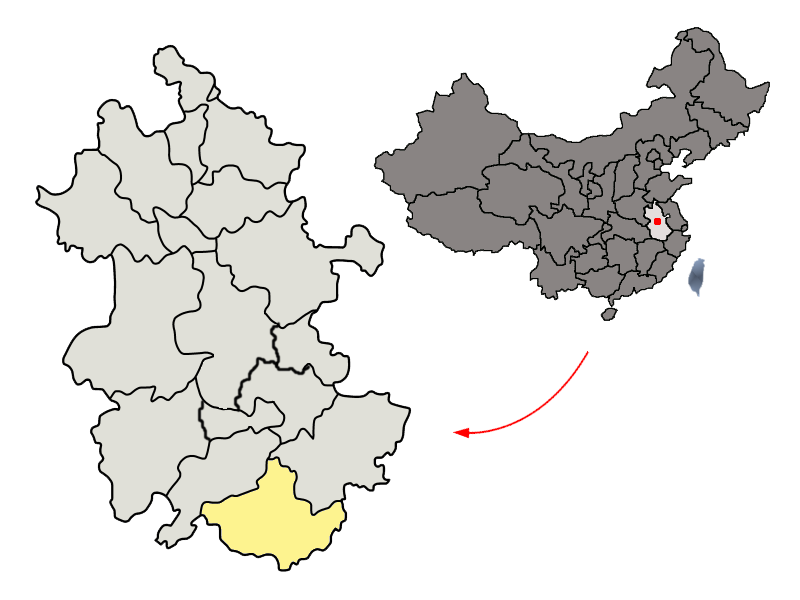
- Huangshan City in Anhui
- Coordinates: 30°16′22″N 118°08′30″E
- Country: China
- Province: Anhui
- Prefecture-level city: Huangshan
- District seat: Gantang

Area
  - Total: 1,747 km^{2} (675 sq mi)

Population (2020)
  - Total: 146,942
  - Density: 84.11/km^{2} (217.8/sq mi)
- Time zone: UTC+8 (China Standard)
- Postal code: 245700

Huangshan District (simplified Chinese: 黄山区; traditional Chinese: 黃山區; pinyin: Huángshān Qū) is a district of Huangshan City, Anhui province, China. It has a population of 163,000 and an area of 1,669 square kilometres (644 mi^{2}). The government of Huangshan District is located in Jintai Town. The renowned Huangshan Mountain is located within the district.

== Administrative divisions ==
Huangshan District is divided to 1 Subdistrict, 9 towns and 5 townships.

Subdistricts

- Xincheng Subdistrict (新城街道)

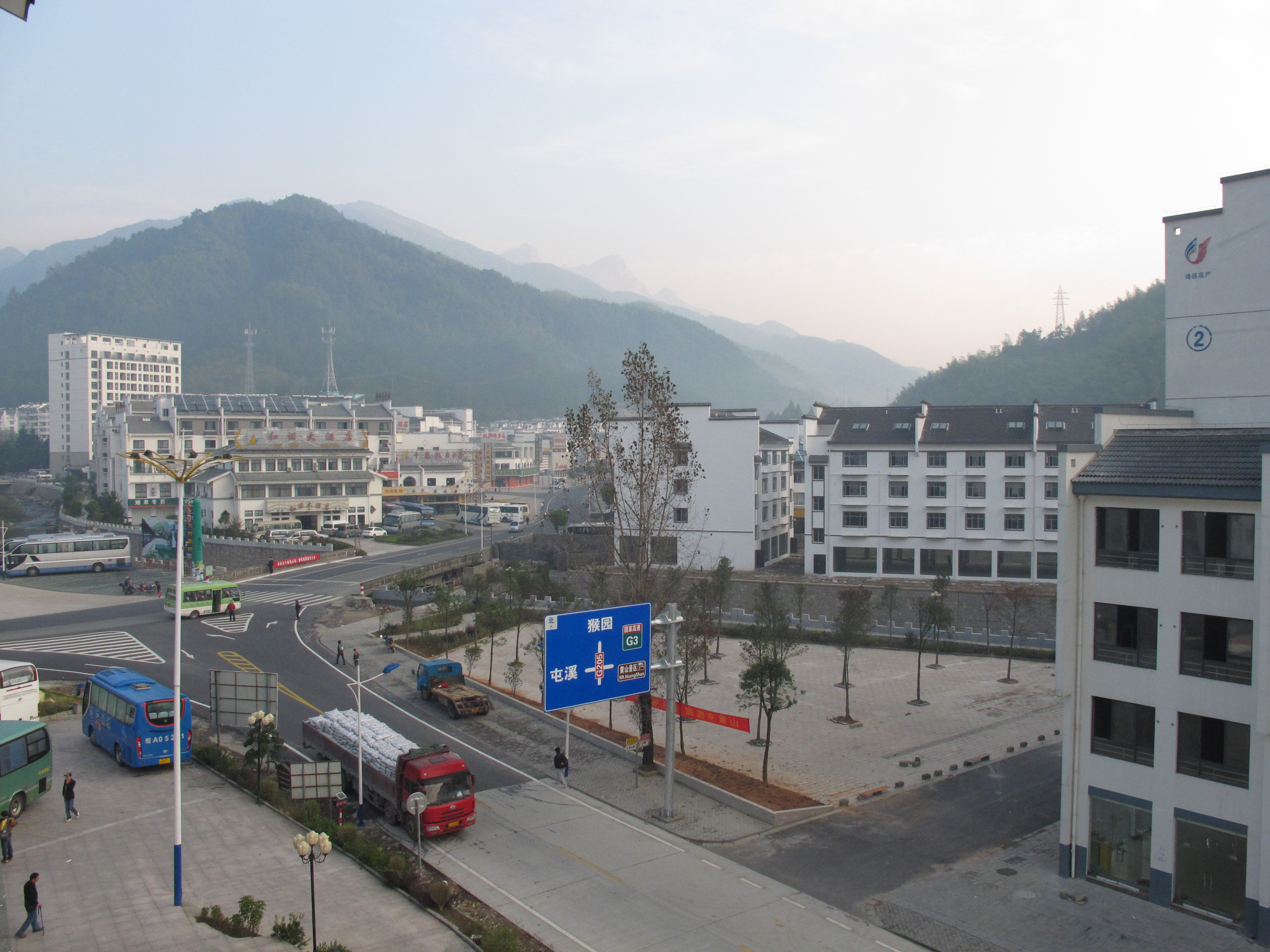
Zhaixi Village

Towns

- Gantang (甘棠镇)
- Xianyuan (仙源镇)
- Taipinghu (太平湖镇)
- Gengcheng (耿城镇)
- Tanjiaqiao (谭家桥镇)
- Tangkou (汤口镇)
- Sankou (三口镇)
- Jiaocun (焦村镇)
- Wushi (乌石镇)

Townships

- Xinfeng Township (新丰乡)
- Xinhua Township (新华乡)
- Yongfeng Township (永丰乡)
- Longmen Township (龙门乡)
- Xinming Township (新明乡)

== Climate ==
Climate data for Huangshan District, elevation 193 m (633 ft), (1991–2020 normals)
Month	Jan	Feb	Mar	Apr	May	Jun	Jul	Aug	Sep	Oct	Nov	Dec	Year
Mean daily maximum °C (°F)	8.9 (48.0)	11.9 (53.4)	16.7 (62.1)	22.9 (73.2)	27.4 (81.3)	29.7 (85.5)	33.3 (91.9)	32.7 (90.9)	28.7 (83.7)	23.7 (74.7)	17.8 (64.0)	11.6 (52.9)	22.1 (71.8)
Daily mean °C (°F)	3.4 (38.1)	6.0 (42.8)	10.3 (50.5)	16.3 (61.3)	21.1 (70.0)	24.4 (75.9)	27.7 (81.9)	26.9 (80.4)	22.7 (72.9)	17.0 (62.6)	10.9 (51.6)	5.1 (41.2)	16.0 (60.8)
Mean daily minimum °C (°F)	−0.3 (31.5)	1.8 (35.2)	5.6 (42.1)	11.2 (52.2)	16.3 (61.3)	20.6 (69.1)	23.6 (74.5)	23.2 (73.8)	18.9 (66.0)	12.5 (54.5)	6.3 (43.3)	0.7 (33.3)	11.7 (53.1)
Average precipitation mm (inches)	84.2 (3.31)	93.2 (3.67)	139.7 (5.50)	154.5 (6.08)	182.7 (7.19)	288.3 (11.35)	230.0 (9.06)	158.7 (6.25)	86.4 (3.40)	59.1 (2.33)	67.1 (2.64)	54.1 (2.13)	1,598 (62.91)
Average precipitation days (≥ 0.1 mm)	13.1	12.7	15.9	14.7	14.4	16.0	13.9	14.9	10.0	8.9	10.8	10.0	155.3
Average snowy days	4.6	2.4	0.8	0	0	0	0	0	0	0	0.2	1.9	9.9
Average relative humidity (%)	79	78	77	76	77	81	79	81	82	80	81	78	79
Mean monthly sunshine hours	96.4	98.1	119.3	134.8	151.5	126.2	191.6	169.7	140.6	141.8	122.5	121.7	1,614.2
Percentage possible sunshine	30	31	32	35	36	30	45	42	38	40	39	39	36
Source: China Meteorological Administration
