= Yeji, Lu'an =

Yeji 叶集区
- District
- Interactive map of Yeji
- Coordinates: 31°51′49″N 115°55′31″E
- Country: People's Republic of China
- Province: Anhui
- Prefecture-level city: Lu'an

Area
  - Total: 568 km^{2} (219 sq mi)

Population (2019)
  - Total: 279,100
  - Density: 491/km^{2} (1,270/sq mi)
- Time zone: UTC+8 (China Standard)
- Postal code: 237431

Yeji District (simplified Chinese: 叶集区; traditional Chinese: 葉集區; pinyin: Yèjí Qū) is a district of the city of Lu'an, Anhui Province, People's Republic of China, bordering Henan province to the west. It has an area of 320 square kilometres (120 sq mi). The government of Yeji District is located in Yeji Town. Yeji District was established from parts of Huoqiu County of two towns (Yeji and Sanyuan) and one township (Sungang).

== Administrative divisions ==
Yeji District has jurisdiction to 2 towns and 1 townships.

2 Towns

- Yeji (叶集镇)
- Sanyuan (三原镇)

1 Townships

- Sungang (孙岗乡)
