= Lieshan, Huaibei =

Coordinates: 33°53′25″N 116°49′17″E

Lieshan 烈山区
- District
- Interactive map of Lieshan
- Country: China
- Province: Anhui
- Prefecture-level city: Huaibei
- District seat: Yangzhuang

Area
  - Total: 388 km^{2} (150 sq mi)

Population (2020)
  - Total: 249,237
  - Density: 642/km^{2} (1,660/sq mi)
- Time zone: UTC+8 (China Standard)
- Postal code: 235025

Lieshan District (Chinese: 烈山区; pinyin: Lièshān Qū) is a district of Anhui Province, China. It is under the administration of Huaibei city.

== Administrative divisions ==
In the present, Lieshan District has 4 subdistricts and 3 towns.

4 Subdistricts

- Yangzhuang (杨庄街道)
- Renlou (任楼街道)
- Linhaitong (临海童街道)
- Baishan (百善街道)

3 Towns

- Songtuan (宋疃镇)
- Lieshan (烈山镇)
- Gurao (古饶镇)
