= Tongguanshan District =

District in Tongling, Anhui, China

Coordinates: 30°54′40″N 117°48′48″E

Tongguanshan District (simplified Chinese: 铜官山区; traditional Chinese: 銅官山區; pinyin: Tóngguānshān Qū) is a district under the administration of Tongling City in, Anhui Province, People's Republic of China. It has a total area of 30 square kilometres (12 sq mi), and a population of approximately 260,000. The district's postal code is 244000. It was merged with Shizishan District to form Tongguan District in October 2015.

== Administrative divisions ==
Tongguanshan District administers six streets. These include Changjianglu Street, Tongguanshan Street, Yangjiashan Street, Shichenglu Street, Saobagou Street, and Henggang Street.
