= Yuhui, Bengbu =

Coordinates: 32°55′51.52″N 117°20′11.68″E

Yuhui 禹会区
- District
- Interactive map of Yuhui
- Country: China
- Province: Anhui
- Prefecture-level city: Bengbu

Area
  - Total: 331 km^{2} (128 sq mi)

Population (2020)
  - Total: 325,814
  - Density: 984/km^{2} (2,550/sq mi)
- Time zone: UTC+8 (China Standard)
- Postal code: 233010

Yuhui District (simplified Chinese: 禹会区; traditional Chinese: 禹會區; pinyin: Yǔhuì Qū) is a district of the city of Bengbu, Anhui Province, China.

== Administrative divisions ==
Yuhui District is divided to 5 subdistricts, 1 town and 1 township.

5 Subdistricts

- Chaoyang (朝阳街道)
- Diaoyutai (钓鱼台街道)
- Zhanggongshan (张公山街道)
- Daqing (大庆街道)
- Weisi (纬四街道)

1 Town

- Qinji (秦集镇)

1 Township

- Changqing (长青乡)
