= Bengshan, Bengbu =

Coordinates: 32°56′38.67″N 117°21′45.62″E

Bengshan 蚌山区
- District
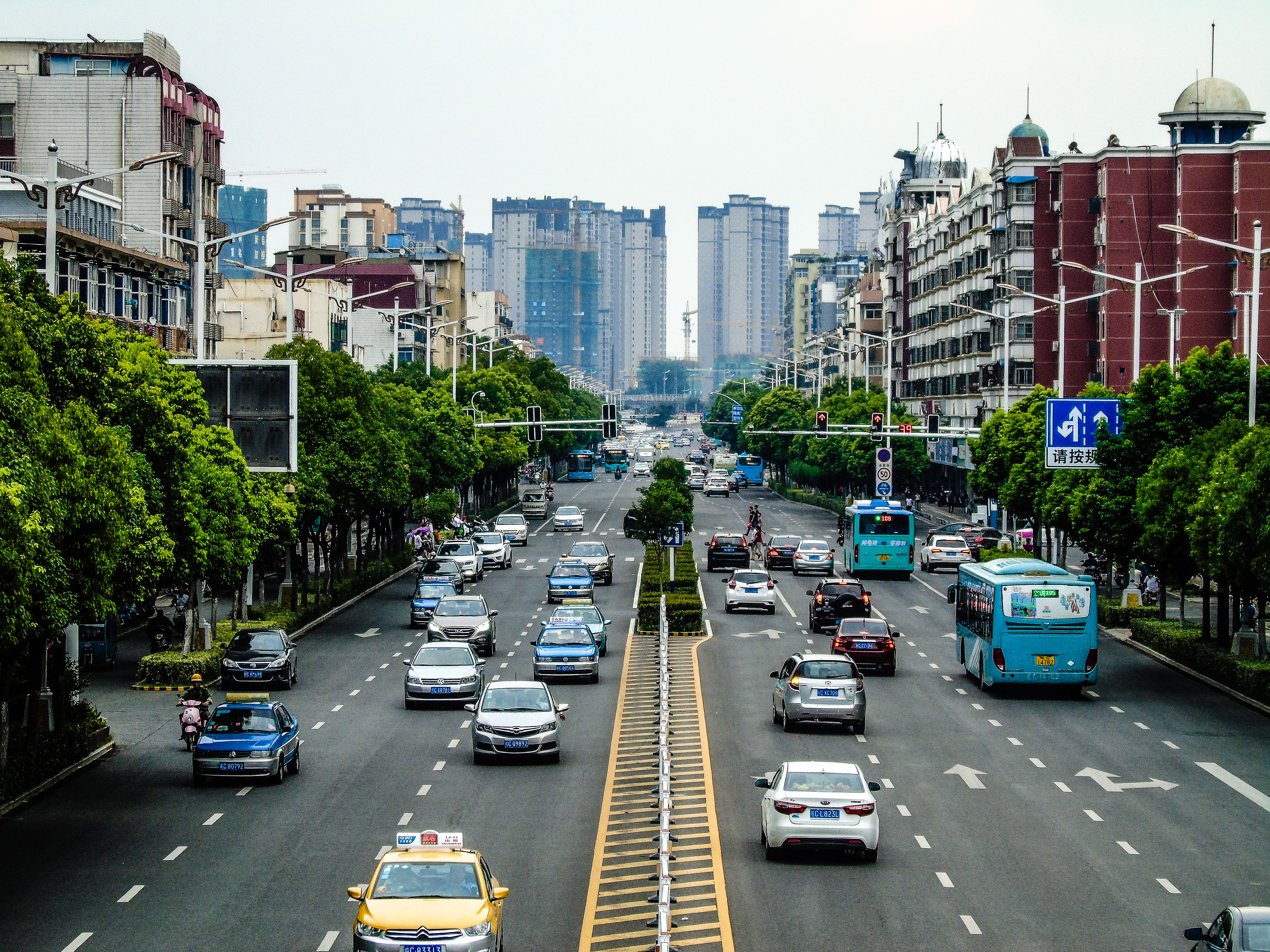

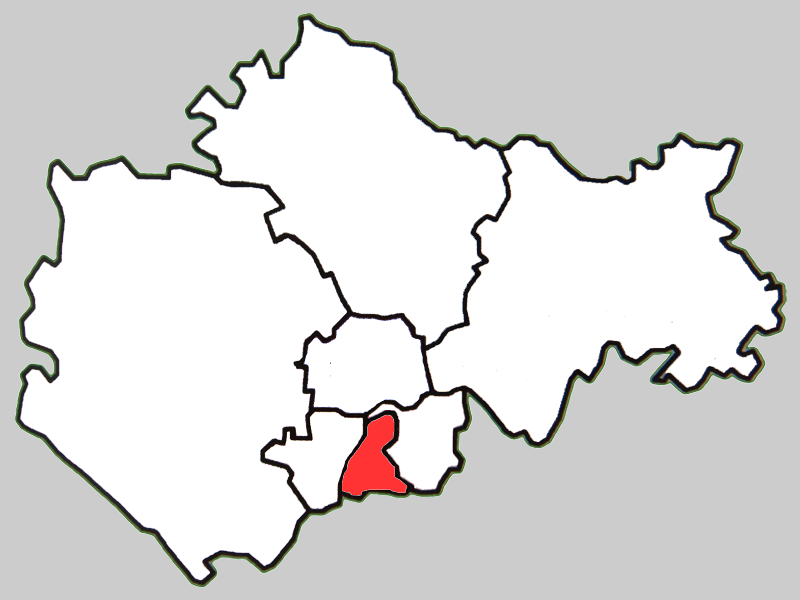
- Location in Bengbu

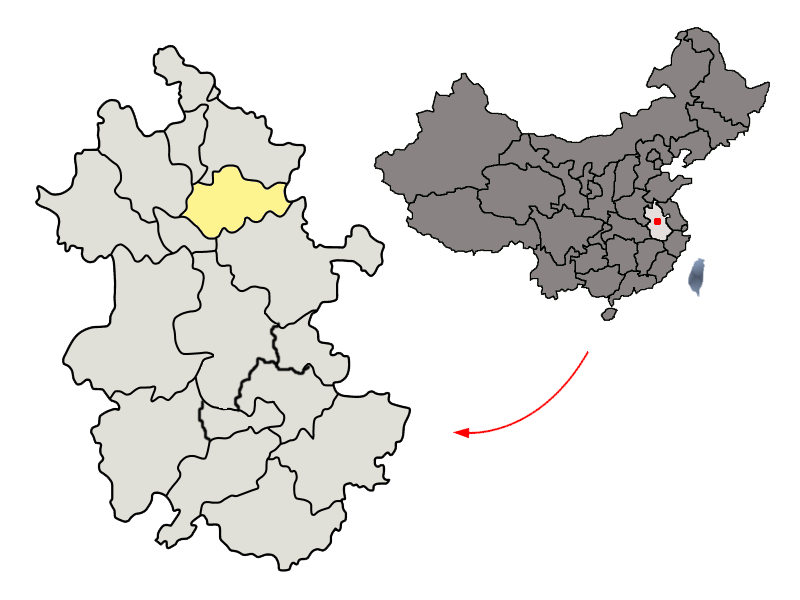
- Location of Bengbu in Anhui
- Country: China
- Province: Anhui
- Prefecture-level city: Bengbu

Area
  - Total: 83.08 km^{2} (32.08 sq mi)

Population (2020)
  - Total: 171,045
  - Density: 2,059/km^{2} (5,332/sq mi)
- Time zone: UTC+8 (China Standard)
- Postal code: 233000

Bengshan (Chinese: 蚌山; pinyin: Bèngshān) is a district of the city of Bengbu, Anhui Province, China.

== Administrative divisions ==
Bengshan District is divided to 7 subdistricts and 2 townships.

7 Subdistricts

- Tianqiao (天桥街道)
- Qingnian (青年街道)
- Wei'erlu (纬二路街道)
- Huangzhuang (黄庄街道)
- Hongyecun (宏业村街道)
- Shengli (胜利街道)
- Longhuxincun (龙湖新村街道)

2 Townships

- Xuehua (雪华乡)
- Yanshan (燕山乡)
