= Baishan (disambiguation) =

Baishan is a prefecture-level city in Jilin province of the People's Republic of China. It may also refer to:

== People ==
- Baishan (Apache) (c. 1816 – 1857), a Chihenne (Mimbres) Apache chieftain of the Warm Springs Apache Band

== Places in China ==
- Baekdu Mountain, known in Chinese as Changbaishan or Baishan in short
- Baishan, Lujiang County, town in Hefei, Anhui
- Baishan, Suixi County, town in Huaibei, Anhui
- Baishan Subdistrict, in Lieshan District, Huaibei, Anhui
- Baishan, Beijing, town in Changping District, Beijing
- Baishan, Guangxi, town in Mashan County, Guangxi
- Baishan, Heilongjiang, town in Longjiang County, Heilongjiang
- Baishan Township, Jilin, in Lishu County, Jilin
- Baishan Township, Liaoning, in Jianping County, Liaoning
- Baishan Township, Sichuan, in Cangxi County, Sichuan
- Baishan Dam, arch-gravity dam on the Second Songhua River in Huadian, Jilin

== See also ==
- Baishan Fir, see Abies beshanzuensis
- Bai Shan, Chinese actress
