= Tianmen Mountain =

Mountain in China

- 天门山
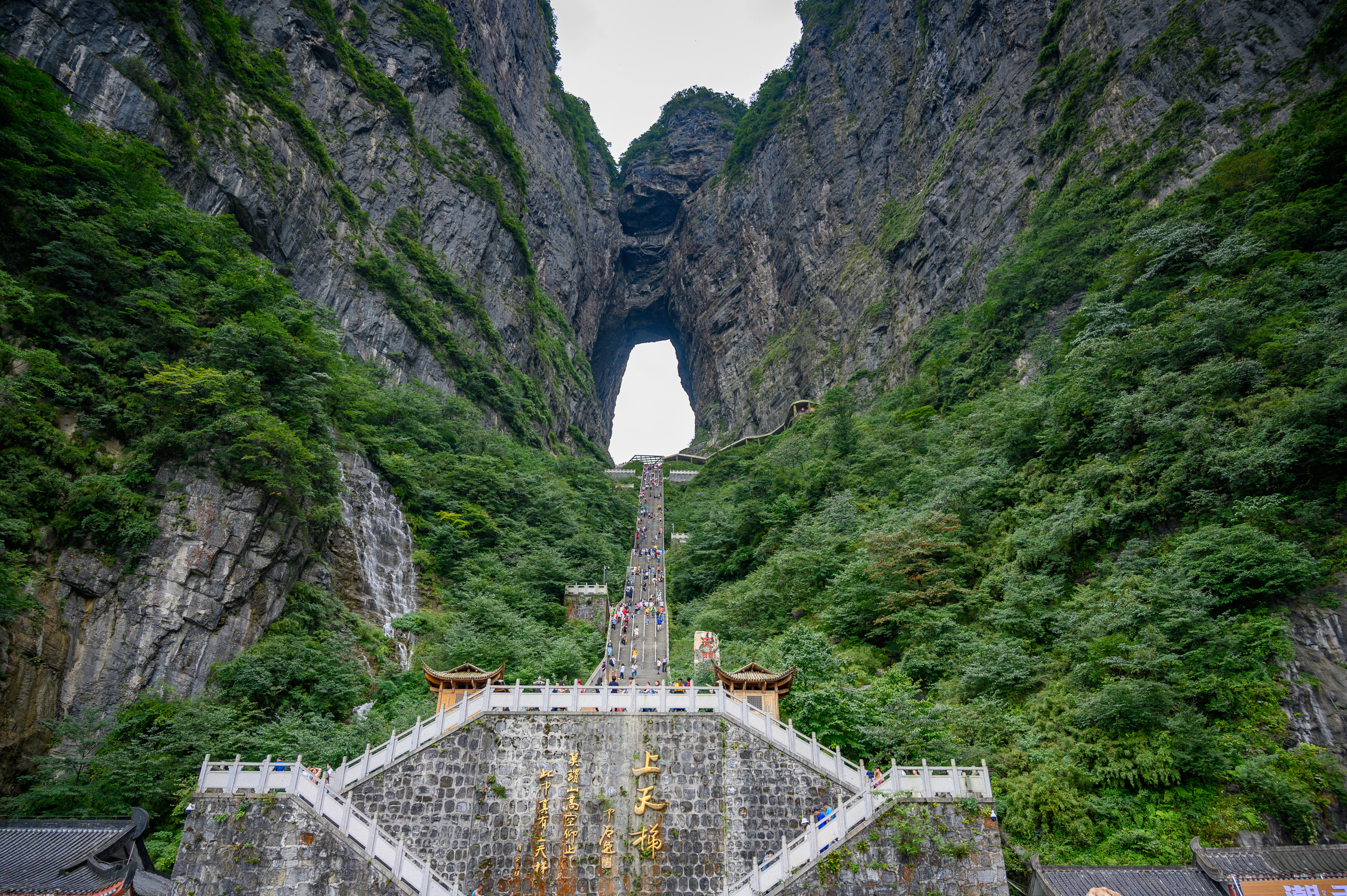

Highest point
- Elevation: 1,518.6 metres (4,982 ft)
- Prominence: 1,518.6 metres (4,982 ft)
- Coordinates: 29°2′59.57″N 110°28′44.00″E

Geography
- Location within Hunan

Tianmen Mountain (simplified Chinese: 天门山; traditional Chinese: 天門山; pinyin: Tiānmén Shān; lit. 'Heaven's Gate Mountain') is a mountain located within Tianmen Mountain National Park, Zhangjiajie, in the northwestern part of Hunan Province, China.

== Mountain ==
A cablecar was constructed in 2005 by the French company Poma from nearby Zhangjiajie railway station to the top of the mountain. Tianmen Mountain Cableway is claimed in tourist publications as the "longest passenger cableway of high mountains in the world", with 98 cars and a total length of 7,455 m (24,459 ft) and ascent of 1,279 m (4,196 ft). The highest gradient is 37 degrees. Tourists can walk on kilometers of paths built along the cliff face at the top of the mountain, including sections with glass floors. An 11 km (7 mi) road – Tongtian Avenue – with 99 bends also reaches the top of the mountain and takes visitors to Tianmen cave natural arch in the mountain of a height of 131.5 m (431.4 ft). As with the mountain, the cave translates as Heaven's Door/天门 and has a 999 step entrance known as "the Stairway to Heaven."

The Tianmenshan Temple is located on the summit, with chairlift or footpath access. The original temple there was built during the Tang dynasty and destroyed during the first part of the 20th century. In 1949, as the Chinese Communist Revolution neared its end, construction of a new temple, with Tang dynasty architecture, began; the temple now sits on landscaped grounds covering 2 hectares (4.9 acres).

In 2007, Alain Robert scaled the cliff below the arch, bare-handed and without protection; a plaque commemorates his feat.

The World Wingsuit League held the first and second World Wingsuit Championships in Tianmen. On October 8, 2013, during a training jump for the second world championships, Viktor Kováts plunged to his death when he was unable to open his parachute.

In August 2016, a glass skywalk overlooking Tongtian Avenue, called the "Coiling Dragon Cliff", opened to the public.

In September 2016, the Italian driver Fabio Barone set the first speed world record with his Ferrari 458 Italia, covering the nearly 11 km (6.8-mile) route in 10 minutes and 31 seconds.

In February 2018, a hybrid Range Rover Sport driven by Ho-Pin Tung climbed the 45-degree angle staircase of 999 steps to Heaven's Gate using a combination of gasoline and electric battery power.

In April 2023, four people died in a group suicide on one of the skywalks at Tianmen Mountain. Three men jumped to their deaths from the west line skywalk at a height of roughly 1,430 m (4,691.6 ft). The fourth person, a woman, was stopped from jumping but had already swallowed poison, causing her death.

In November 2025, Chery brought a Fulwin X3L to Tianmen Mountain in an attempt to duplicate the Range Rover Sport's 2018 climb to Heaven's Gate, but the hybrid SUV lost traction halfway and slid downwards before toppling part of the staircase's wall. Chery executives issued a formal apology and pledged to repair the damage.

On 21 June 2026, a projection mapping show hosted by Riot Games took place at the mountain as a teaser for Valorant's 13th map, Summit, ahead of the Masters London grand finals.

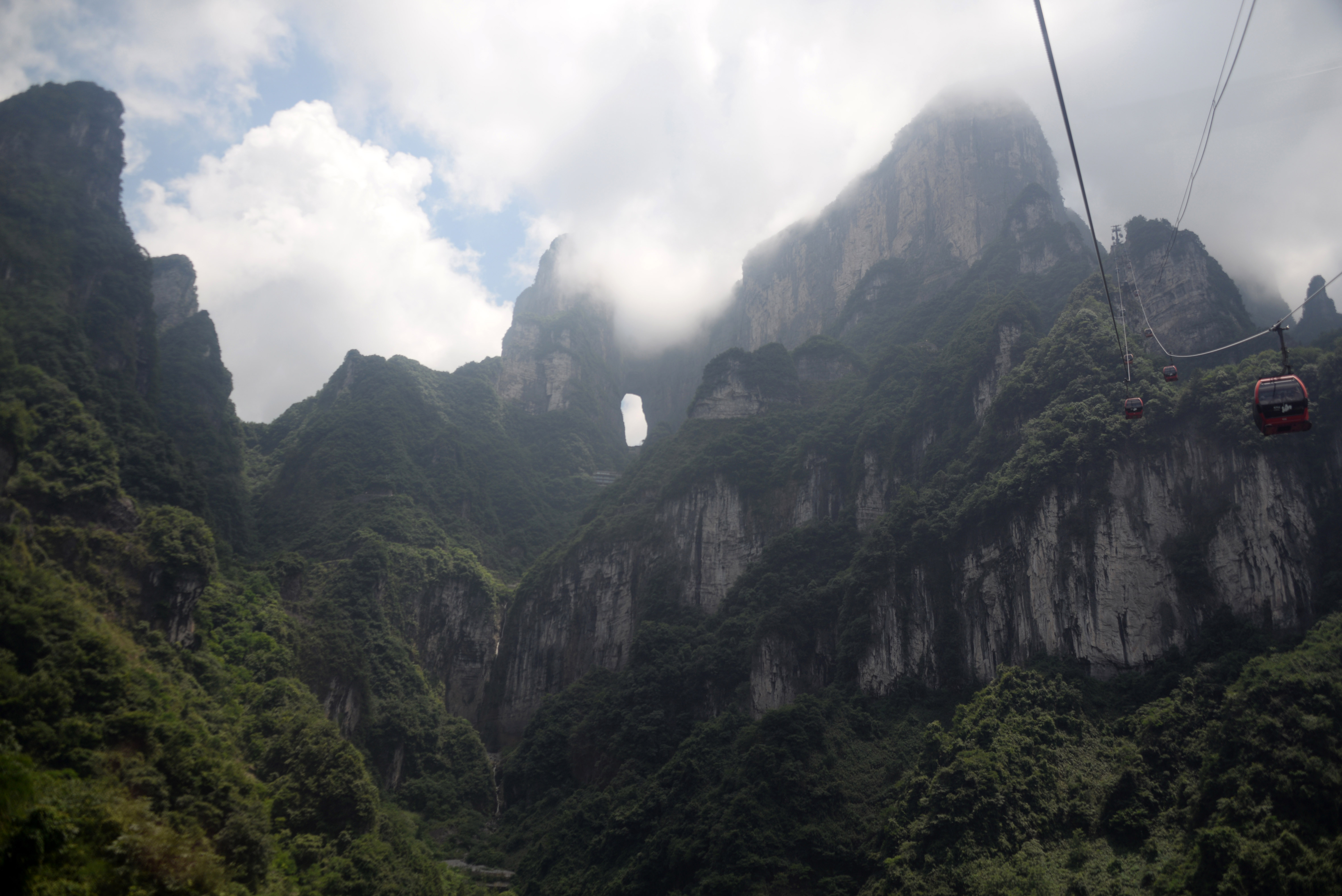
View from the aerial lift

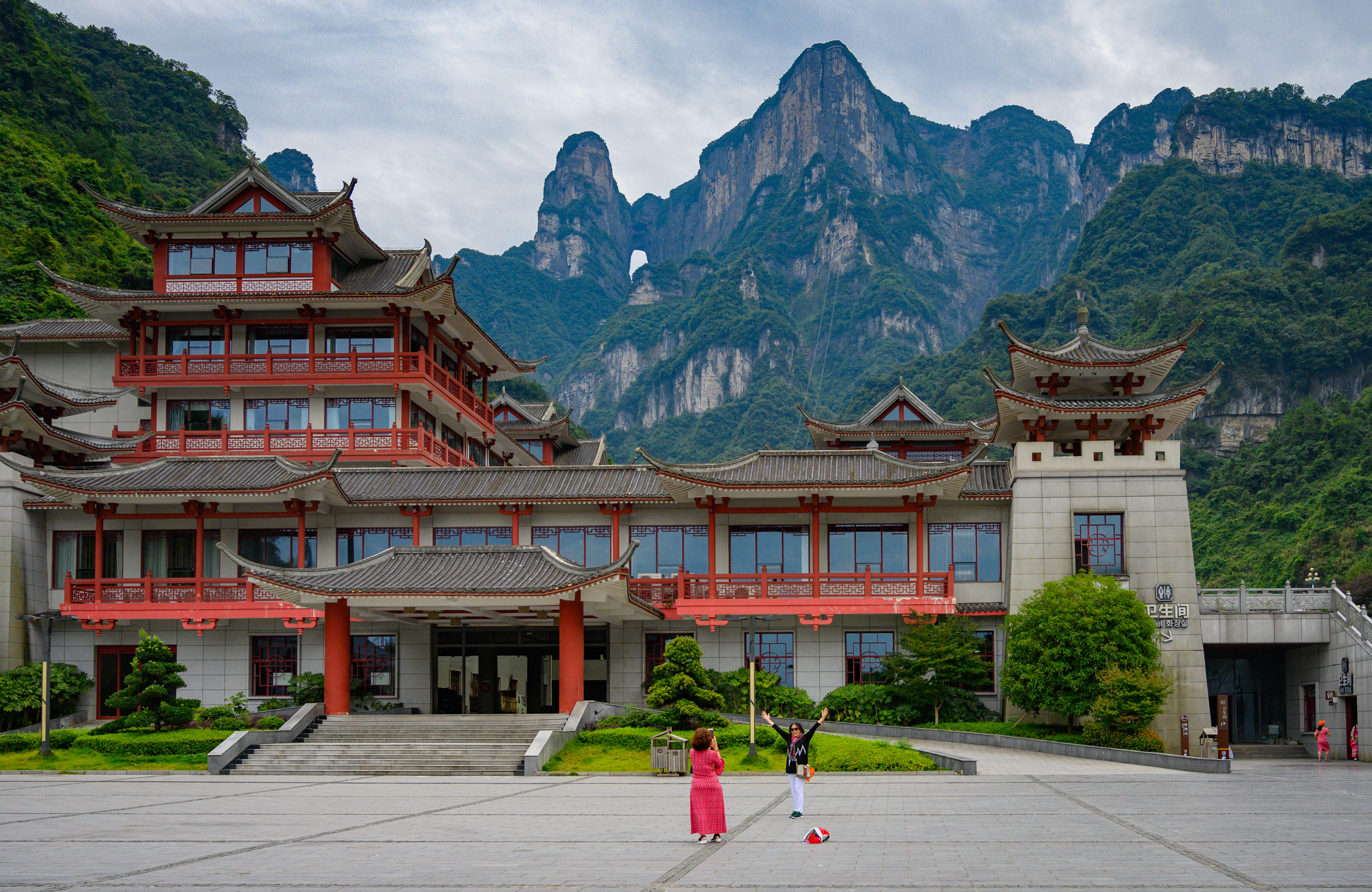
Main Gate

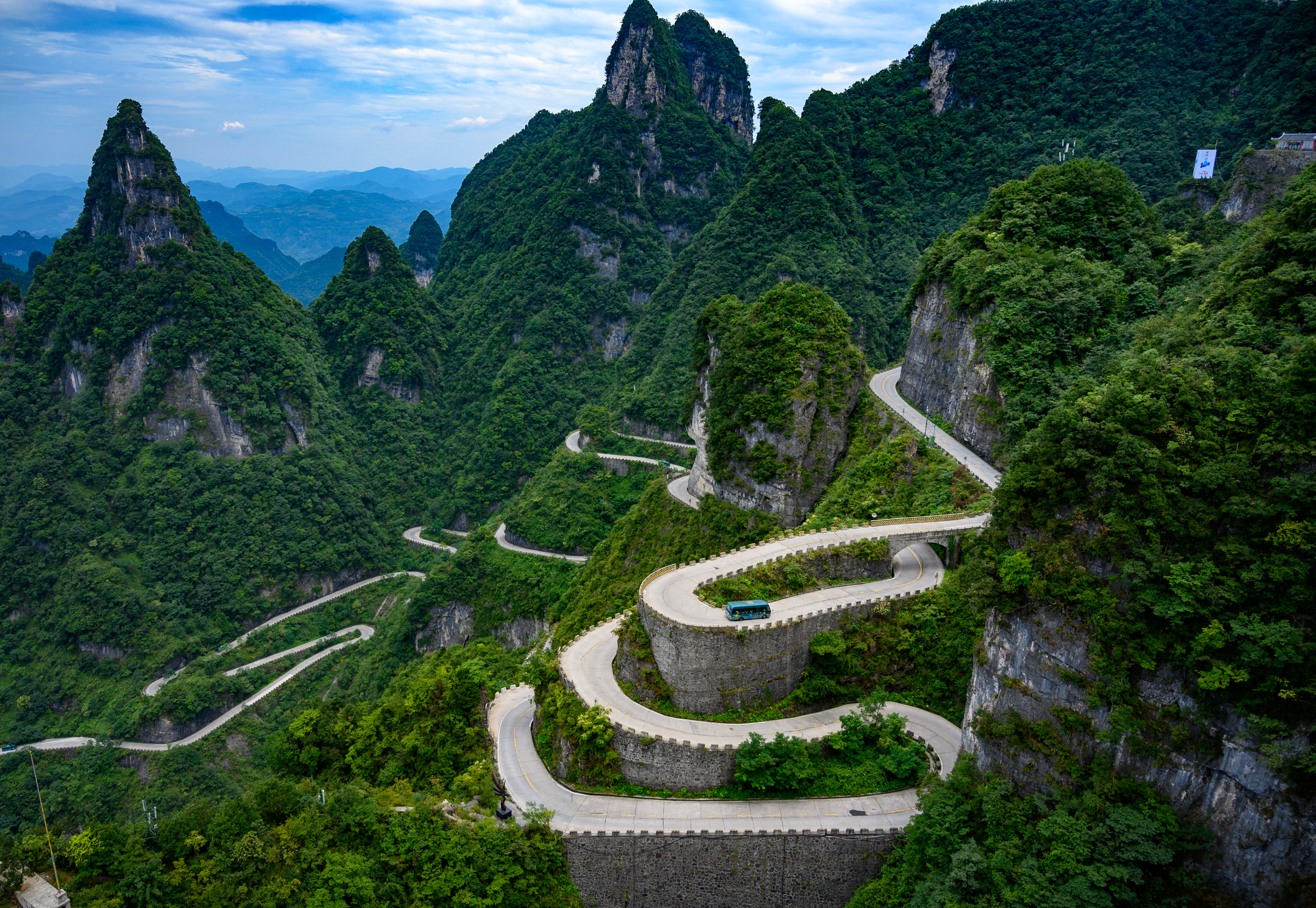
View of the Heaven-Linking Avenue from a cable car

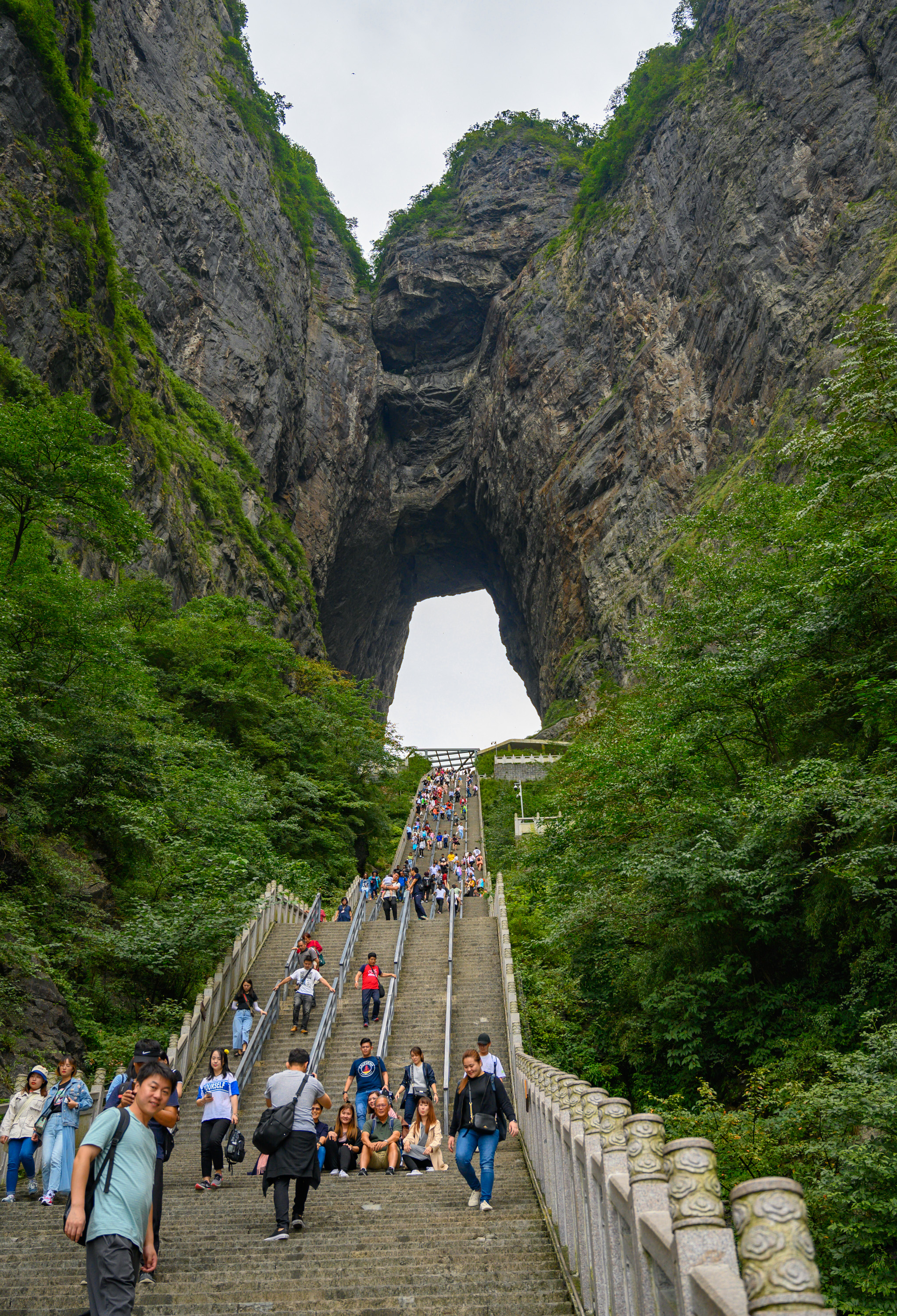
View of the natural arch and the stairway leading to it

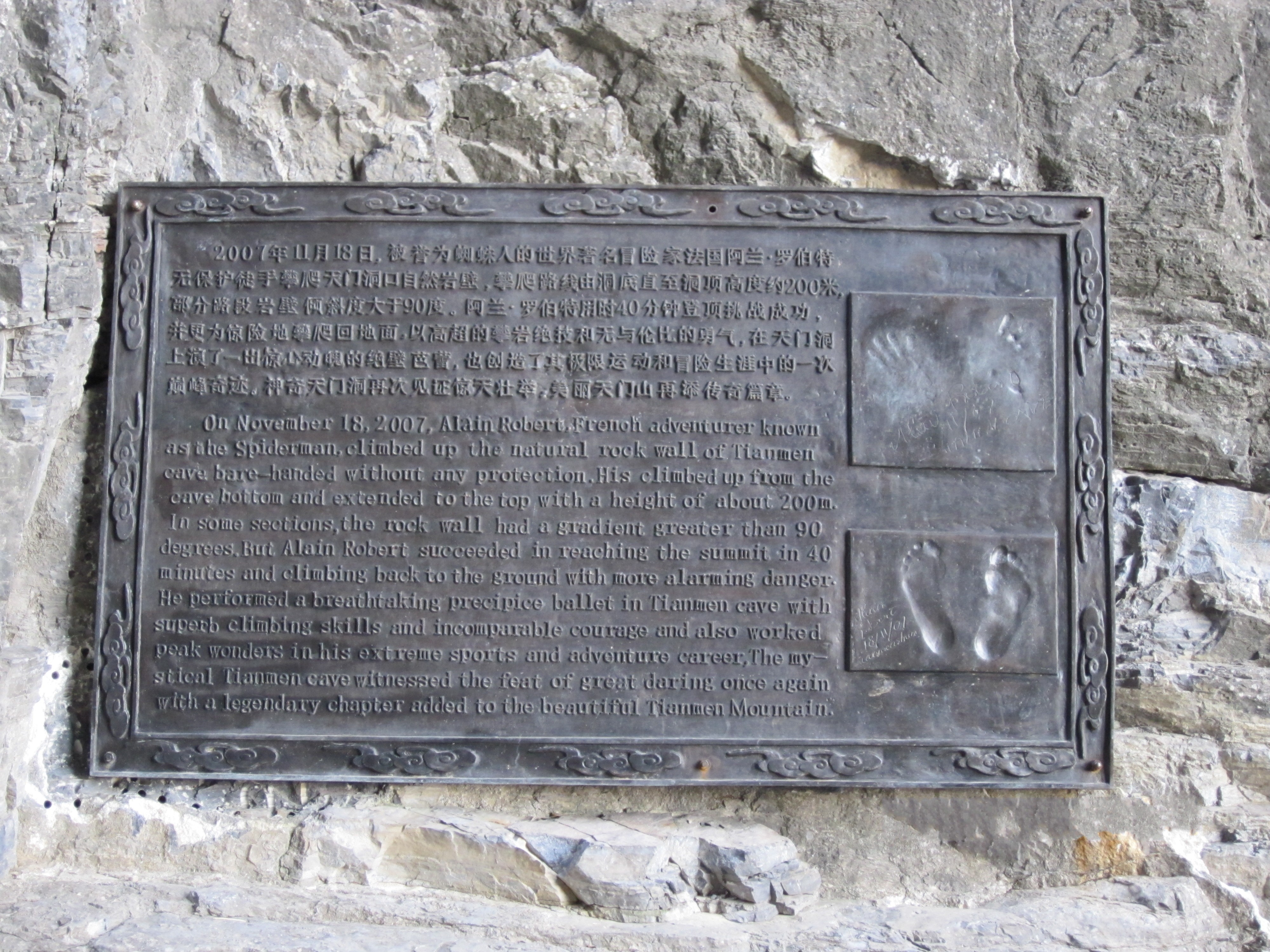
Plaque commemorating Alain Robert's climb in 2007

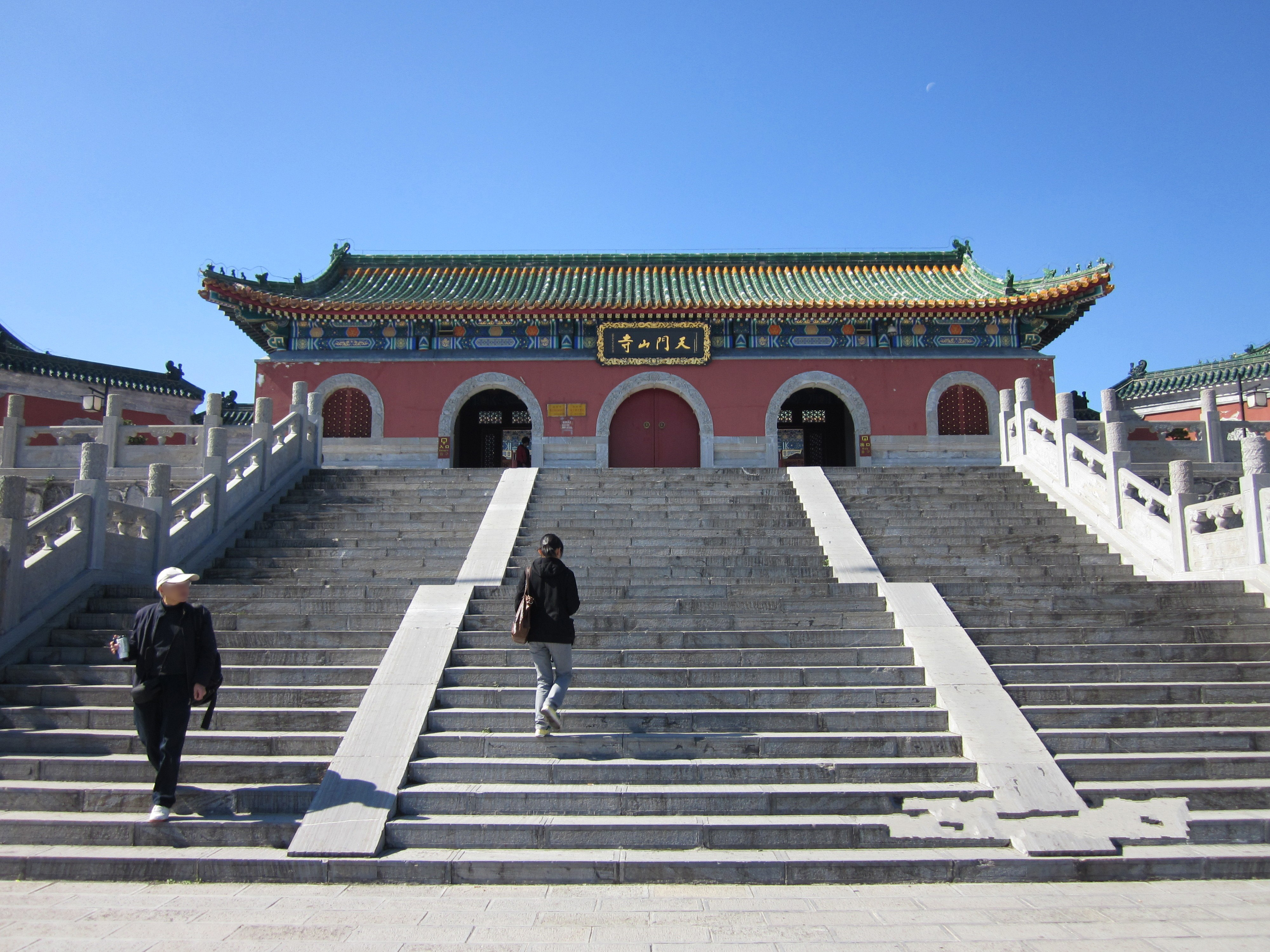
Tianmenshan Temple

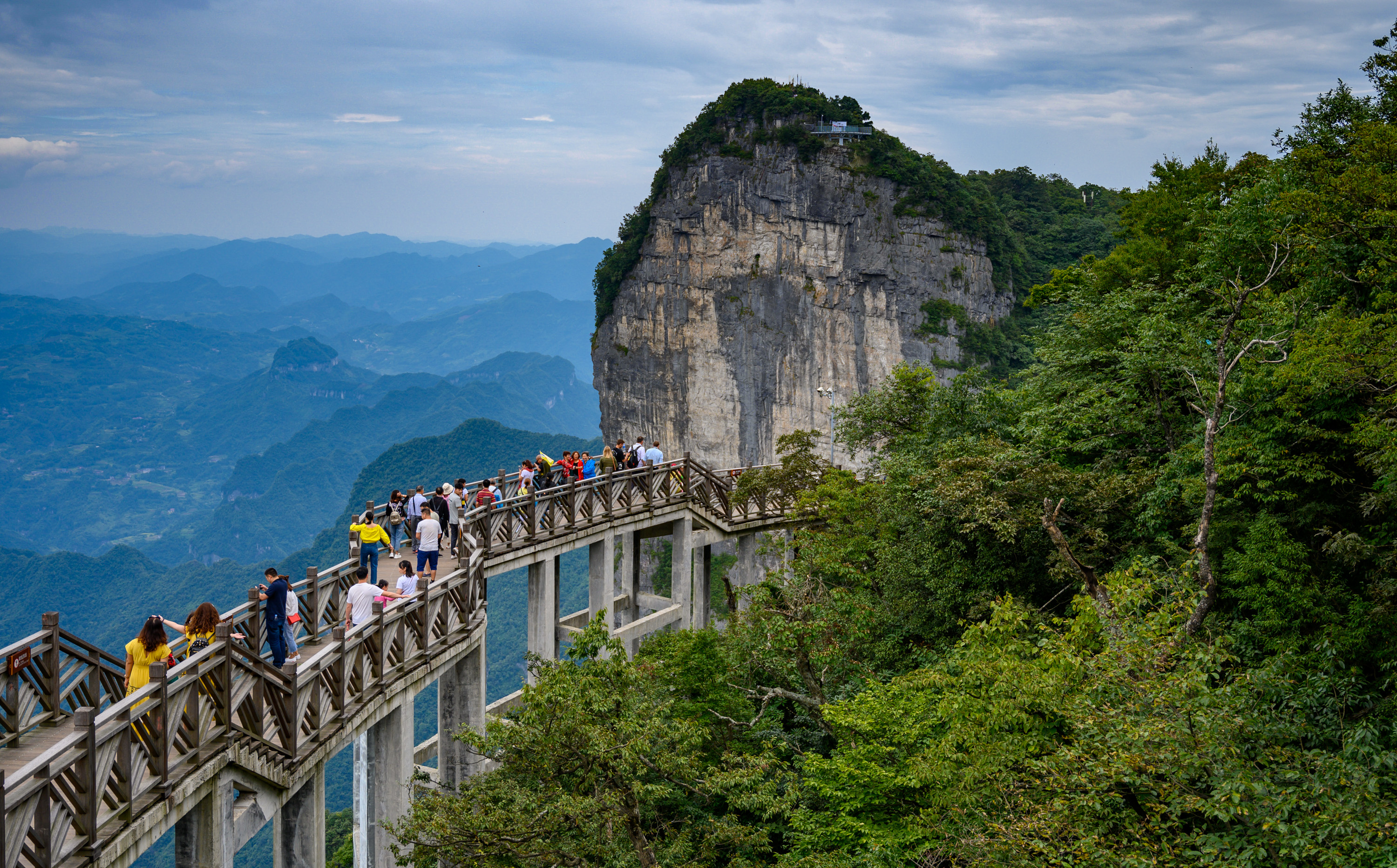
Stairway

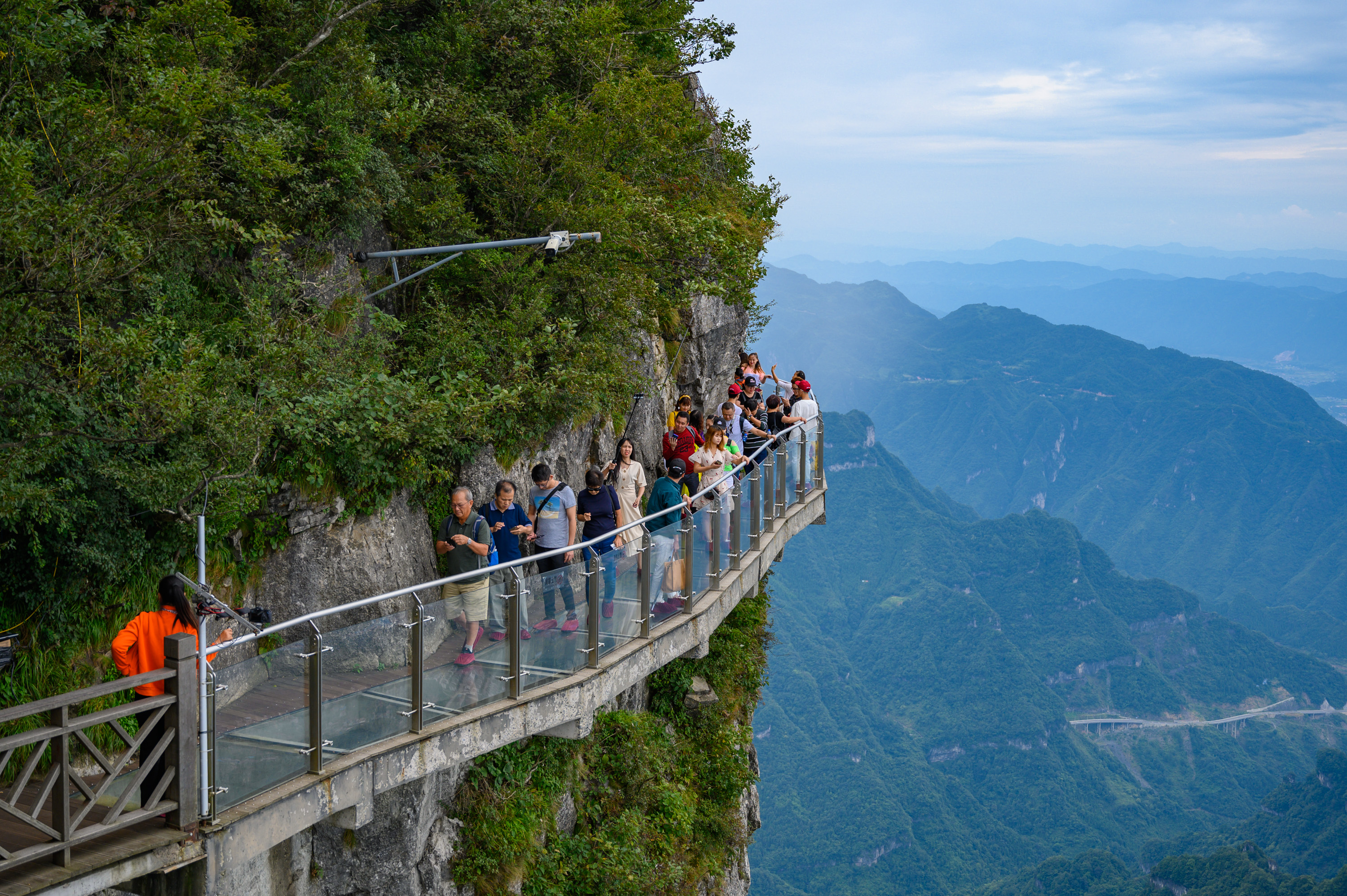
The glass cliff path

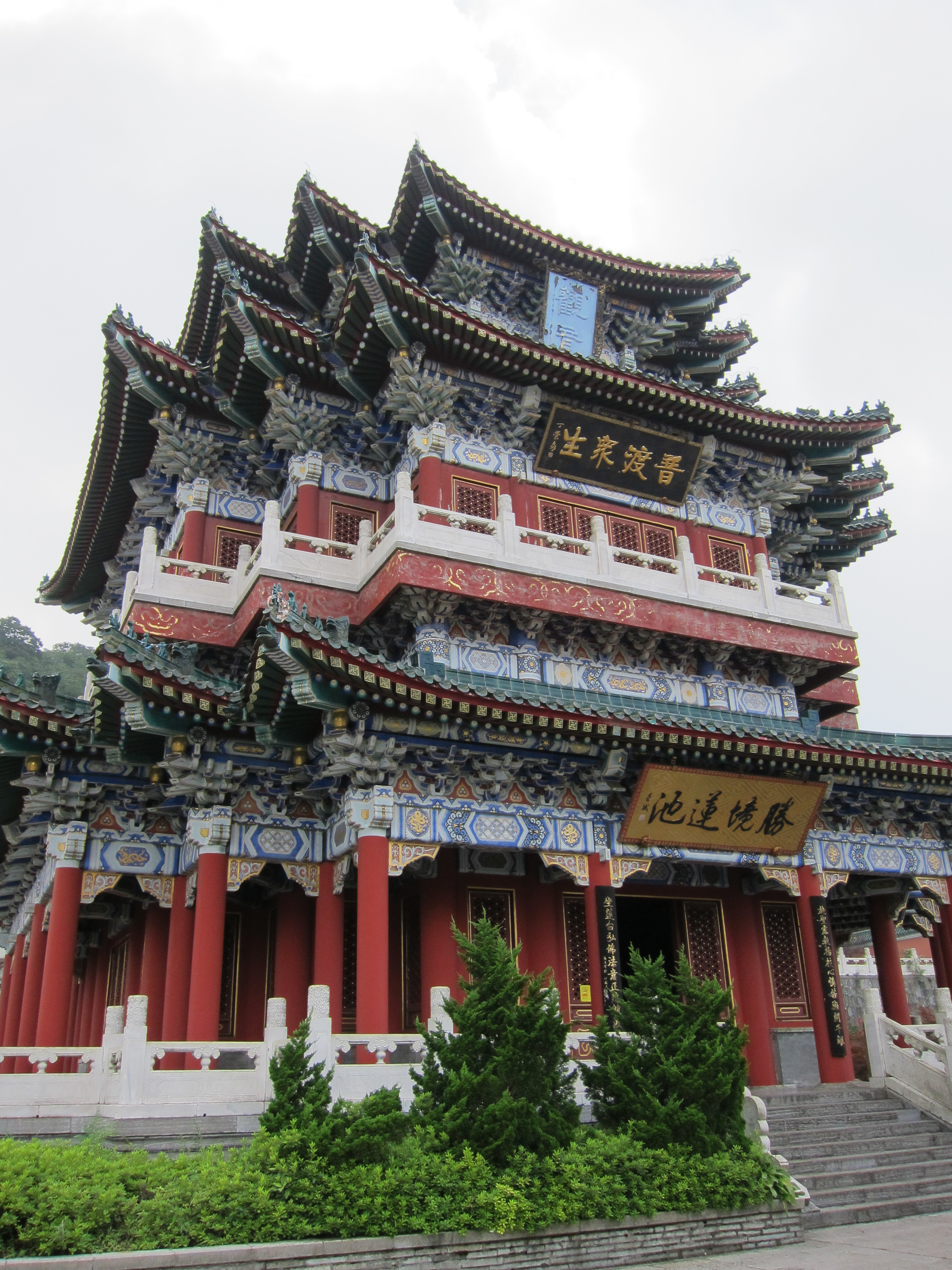
Guanyin Pavilion at Tianmenshan Temple

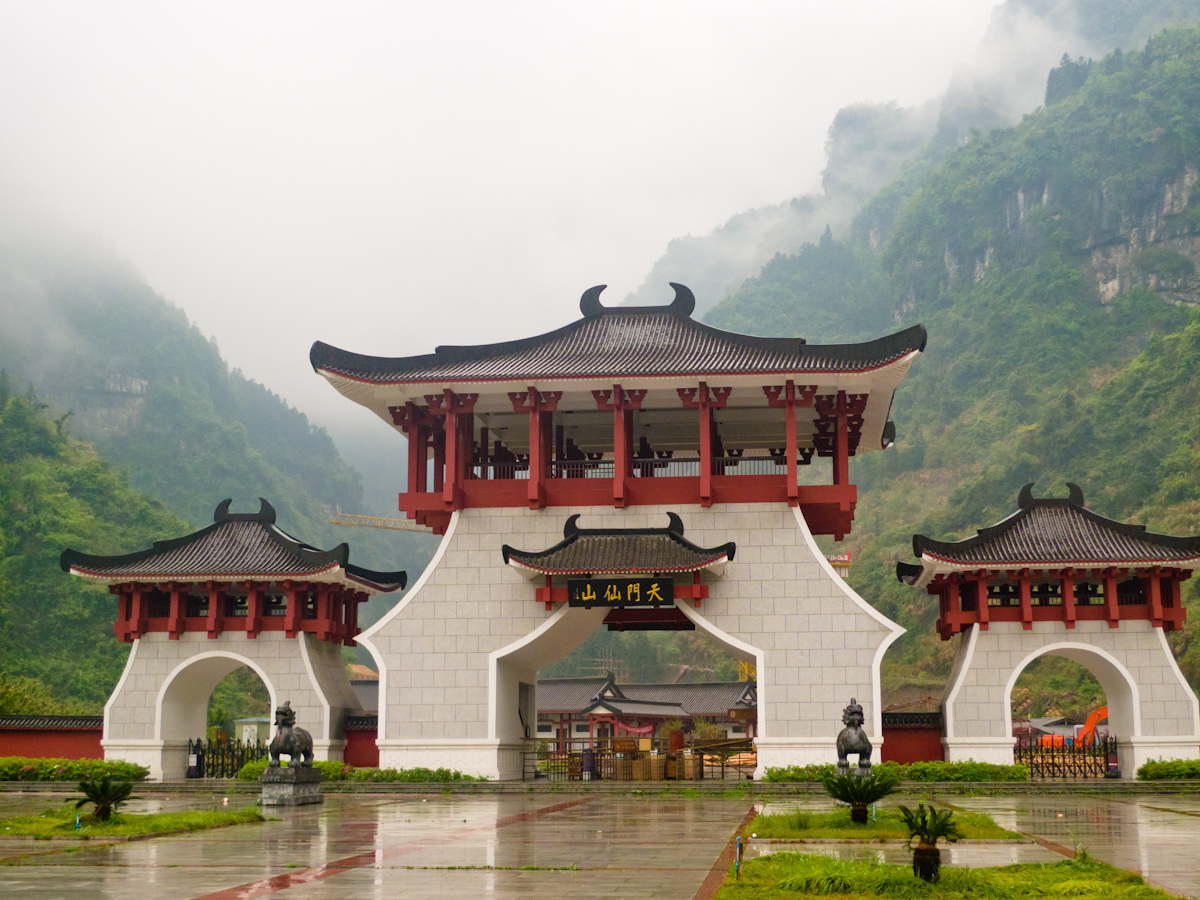
Tianmen Mountain National Park entrance
