= Longchen =

Longchen may refer to:

== Tibetan Buddhism ==
- Longchen Rabjam Drimé Özer (1308–1364), or simply Longchenpa, major Tibetan Buddhist master of the Nyingma Dzogchen lineage
- Longchen Nyingthig (Heart Essence of the Vast Expanse), cycle of Dzogchen teachings revealed by Jigme Lingpa (1730–1798) after visions of Longchenpa
  - Longchen Nyingthig Ngöndro, preliminary practices from the cycle

== Other uses ==
- Guo Longchen (born 1968), a Chinese former cyclist

== See also ==
- Dzogchen, a nongradual path in Indo-Tibetan Buddhism and Bön
- Longxing (disambiguation)
  - Longxing (competition), a contemporary Chinese Go tournament
