= Liu Liaoyi =

Chinese translator

- 刘辽逸
- Born: Liu Changsong (刘长菘); January 8, 1915; Suixi County, Anhui, China
- Died: 2001 (aged 85–86); China
- Education: Northwest United University
- Occupation: Translator
- Spouse: Wang Rong
- Children: 4
- Writing career
- Language: Chinese, Russian
- Period: 1943–2001
- Notable work: War and Peace

Liu Liaoyi (simplified Chinese: 刘辽逸; traditional Chinese: 劉遼逸; pinyin: Liú Liáoyì; 8 January 1915 – May 2001) was a Chinese translator. He was most notable for being one of the main translators into Chinese of the works of the Russian novelist Leo Tolstoy. Douban, a major Chinese book rating site, gave his translation of the novel War and Peace 9.3 out of 10.

== Biography ==
Liu was born in Suixi County, Anhui, in 1915. In 1939 he graduated from Northwest United University, where he majored in Russian language and literature. He started to publish works in 1943. After the founding of the Communist State in 1949, he worked in People's Literature Publishing House as a translator. He was a member of the Central Committee of the China Association for Promoting Democracy.

== Personal life ==
Liu married Wang Rong (Chinese: 汪蓉), the couple had four daughters.

== Translations ==
- Maxim Gorky (2019). 童年 [My Childhood] (in Chinese). Beijing: People's Literature Publishing House. ISBN 9787020147106.
- Leo Tolstoy (2015). 战争与和平 [War and Peace] (in Chinese). Beijing: People's Literature Publishing House. ISBN 9787020102747.
- Leo Tolstoy (2000). 列夫·托尔斯泰文集 [Collections of Leo Tolstoy] (in Chinese). Beijing: People's Literature Publishing House. ISBN 9787020030941.

== Award ==
- Lu Xun Literary Prize – National Outstanding Literary Translation Award (1995)
