= Longxing =

Longxing may refer to:

- Longxing (competition), a Chinese Go competition

== Places ==
- Longxing Temple, (隆興寺) a Buddhist temple in Zhengding County, Hebei, China
- Longxing Subdistrict (龙兴), a subdistrict in Shilong District, Pingdingshan, Henan, China
- Longxing, Heilongjiang (龙兴), a town in Longjiang County, Heilongjiang, China
- Longxing, Shanxi (龙兴), a town in Xinjiang County, Shanxi, China
- Longxing Prefecture, the name of Nanchang from 1164 to 1368

== Historical eras ==
- Longxing (龍興, 25–36), era name used by Gongsun Shu
- Longxing (隆興, 1163–1164), era name used by Emperor Xiaozong of Song

== See also ==
- Longxing Temple (disambiguation)
