= Longxing Temple (Yuanling County) =

Buddhist temple in Hunan, China

- 龙兴寺

- Location within Hunan

Religion
- Affiliation: Buddhism
- Sect: Chan Buddhism

Location
- Location: Yuanling County, Hunan, China
- Interactive map of Longxing Temple
- Coordinates: 28°27′26″N 110°24′03″E

Architecture
- Style: Chinese architecture
- Founder: Emperor Taizong
- Established: 628; 1398 years ago
- Materials: Wood, bricks, and cement

Longxing Temple (simplified Chinese: 龙兴寺; traditional Chinese: 龍興寺; pinyin: Lóngxīng Sì) is a Buddhist temple located in Yuanling County, Hunan, China. It is an ancient building that preserves the architectural styles of the Song dynasty to the Qing dynasty (960–1911), and is the oldest surviving wooden building complex in Hunan.

== History ==
=== Tang dynasty ===
Longxing Temple was originally built under the imperial decree of Emperor Taizong in 628, during the Tang dynasty (618–907). And renovations and redecorations were carried out throughout the following dynasties.

=== Ming dynasty ===
In the 5th year (1510) of the Zhengde reign (1506–1521) of the Ming dynasty (1368–1644), eunuch Liu Jin was executed, and Wang Shouren was exonerated. The next year, Wang left Longchang Post in Guizhou to serve as magistrate of Luling County (now Ji'an, Jiangxi). He passed through Yuanling County, and lived outside the Longxing Temple in the Pingxu Tower (凭虛樓), where he inscribed the plaque "Songyun Xuan" (松雲軒) originating from his childhood name "Wang Yun" (王雲) and taught "To Conscience" (致良知) in the temple for a month. He also left a poem on the wall inside the temple.

=== Qing dynasty ===
In the Qing dynasty (1644–1911), in the 29th year (1849) of Daoguang Emperor's reign (1821–1850), the Mahavira Hall, Shanmen and the corridor were repaired; in the 1st year (1851) of Xianfeng period (1851–1861), the Zhantan Pavilion (旃檀閣) and Maitreya Hall (彌陀殿) were renovated; in the 11th year (1872) of the Tongzhi reign (1862–1874), the Second Shanmen was renovated and east and west wing rooms were added to the temple; in the 1st year (1875) of the Guangxu era (1875–1908), the Zhantan Pavilion, Maitreya Hall, and Guanyin Pavilion were refurbished.

=== Republic of China ===
During the Republic of China, Longxing Temple became dilapidated for neglect.

=== People's Republic of China ===
Longxing Temple was inscribed as a provincial-level cultural heritage site by the Hunan Provincial People's Government in 1959. After the 3rd plenary session of the 11th Central Committee of the Chinese Communist Party, as policy of limited religious freedom was implemented, the local government successively repaired and redecorated the Mahavira Hall, Zhantan Pavilion, Maitreya Hall and Guanyin Pavilion. On 20 November 1996, it was listed among the fourth batch of "Major National Historical and Cultural Sites in Hunan" by the State Council of China.

== Architecture ==
Now the existing main buildings of Longxing Temple include Shanmen, Four Heavenly Kings Hall, Mahavira Hall, Maitreya Hall and Guanyin Pavilion.

=== Four Heavenly Kings Hall ===
The Four Heavenly Kings Hall was built in the Qing dynasty (1644–1911) and was later renovated during the Guangxu era (1875–1908). It has a width of 5 rooms and a depth of 3 rooms, with double-eave gable and hip roofs (重簷歇山頂). Statues of Four Heavenly Kings were enshrined in the Hall, but were completely destroyed by the Red Guards during the ten-year Cultural Revolution.

=== Mahavira Hall ===
The Mahavira Hall is the main building of the temple, which was built at the end of the Yuan dynasty and the beginning of the Ming dynasty (14th century). The Mahavira Hall faces south with nearly 20-metre (66 ft) high and covers an area of 362-square-metre (3,900 sq ft), and is supported by 24 nanmu pillars. The plaque under the eaves, which says "The Buddha Kingdom in Front of You" (眼前佛國), was written by Dong Qichang, a calligrapher in the Ming dynasty (1368–1644).

=== Guanyin Pavilion ===
The Guanyin Pavilion is situated at the rear of Longxing Temple, on the central axis, with double-eave gable and hip roofs (重簷歇山頂) of Ming dynasty (1368–1644) architectural style and black tiles. The walls are white gray, and the four corners of the eaves are upturned, facing the Yuan River.
