= Longjiang County =

Longjiang County 龙江县
- County
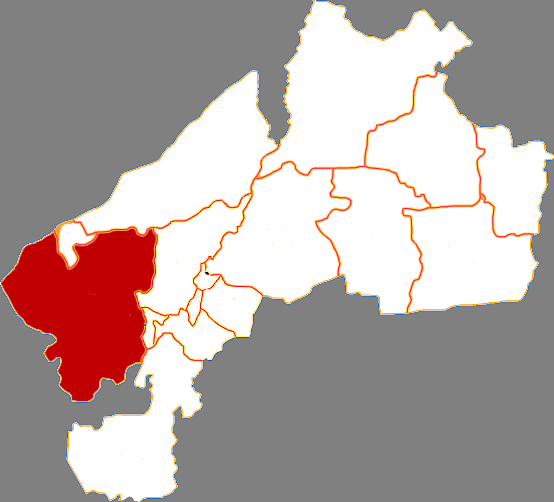

- Location of the seat in Heilongjiang
- Coordinates: 47°19′49″N 123°11′01″E
- Country: People's Republic of China
- Province: Heilongjiang
- Prefecture-level city: Qiqihar

Area
  - Total: 6,197 km^{2} (2,393 sq mi)

Population (2018)
  - Total: 580,847
  - Density: 93.73/km^{2} (242.8/sq mi)
- Time zone: UTC+8 (China Standard)
- Website: www.ljxrmzfw.gov.cn

Longjiang (simplified Chinese: 龙江; traditional Chinese: 龍江; pinyin: Lóngjiāng) is a county under the jurisdiction of Qiqihar City in the west of Heilongjiang province of the People's Republic of China, bordering Inner Mongolia to the west and southwest. It is the home of astronaut Zhai Zhigang.

The county has an area of 6,197 km^{2} (2,393 sq mi) and a population of approximately 600,000.

== Administrative divisions ==
Longjiang County is divided into 8 towns and 6 townships.

8 towns

- Longjiang (龙江镇), Jingxing (景星镇), Longxing (龙兴镇), Shanquan (山泉镇), Qikeshu (七棵树镇), Xingshan (杏山镇), Baishan (白山镇), Touzhan (头站镇)

6 townships

- Heigang (黑岗乡), Guanghou (广厚乡), Huamin (华民乡), Harahai (哈拉海乡), Luhe (鲁河乡), Jiqinhe (济沁河乡)

== Climate ==
Climate data for Longjiang, elevation 209 m (686 ft), (1991–2020 normals, extremes 1981–2010)
Month	Jan	Feb	Mar	Apr	May	Jun	Jul	Aug	Sep	Oct	Nov	Dec	Year
Record high °C (°F)	6.7 (44.1)	11.5 (52.7)	24.4 (75.9)	32.0 (89.6)	39.1 (102.4)	41.5 (106.7)	40.8 (105.4)	36.0 (96.8)	36.2 (97.2)	28.1 (82.6)	16.6 (61.9)	7.6 (45.7)	41.5 (106.7)
Mean daily maximum °C (°F)	−10.9 (12.4)	−5.1 (22.8)	3.6 (38.5)	14.0 (57.2)	22.0 (71.6)	26.8 (80.2)	28.2 (82.8)	26.4 (79.5)	21.2 (70.2)	12.0 (53.6)	−0.5 (31.1)	−9.8 (14.4)	10.7 (51.2)
Daily mean °C (°F)	−16.6 (2.1)	−11.6 (11.1)	−2.7 (27.1)	7.5 (45.5)	15.6 (60.1)	21.1 (70.0)	23.3 (73.9)	21.1 (70.0)	14.8 (58.6)	5.7 (42.3)	−6.0 (21.2)	−15.0 (5.0)	4.8 (40.6)
Mean daily minimum °C (°F)	−20.9 (−5.6)	−16.6 (2.1)	−8.5 (16.7)	1.1 (34.0)	9.2 (48.6)	15.5 (59.9)	18.6 (65.5)	16.4 (61.5)	9.1 (48.4)	0.4 (32.7)	−10.3 (13.5)	−19 (−2)	−0.4 (31.3)
Record low °C (°F)	−34.0 (−29.2)	−33.5 (−28.3)	−21.9 (−7.4)	−10.6 (12.9)	−1.9 (28.6)	3.9 (39.0)	10.0 (50.0)	4.7 (40.5)	−1.5 (29.3)	−15.4 (4.3)	−24.5 (−12.1)	−32.6 (−26.7)	−34.0 (−29.2)
Average precipitation mm (inches)	1.8 (0.07)	2.5 (0.10)	5.1 (0.20)	17.2 (0.68)	33.8 (1.33)	93.6 (3.69)	146.1 (5.75)	115.4 (4.54)	50.8 (2.00)	16.3 (0.64)	5.1 (0.20)	5.1 (0.20)	492.8 (19.4)
Average precipitation days (≥ 0.1 mm)	3.1	2.1	3.2	5.0	7.2	12.3	13.9	11.8	8.1	4.2	3.3	4.8	79
Average snowy days	5.6	3.7	4.8	2.9	0.2	0.1	0	0.1	0.1	2.1	5.2	7.6	32.4
Average relative humidity (%)	60	52	41	39	43	60	72	74	63	52	53	61	56
Mean monthly sunshine hours	182.1	204.4	250.8	245.8	263.2	253.8	249.5	246.6	239.9	217.3	171.3	155.1	2,679.8
Percentage possible sunshine	66	70	67	60	56	54	52	57	64	66	62	59	61
Source: China Meteorological Administration
