= Longxing Temple (disambiguation) =

Longxing Temple (隆興寺) is an ancient Buddhist monastery in Zhengding, Hebei, China.

Longxing Temple may also refer to:

- Qingzhou Longxing Temple (龍興寺), Shandong; site of one of China's 100 major archaeological discoveries in the 20th century
- Longxing Temple (Xinjiang) (龍興寺), a Shanxi cultural site
- Longxing Temple (Yanling County), a Hunan cultural site
