= Lishu County =

Lishu County 梨树县
- County
- Location in Jilin province
- Coordinates: 43°25′N 124°22′E
- Country: People's Republic of China
- Province: Jilin
- Prefecture-level city: Siping
- Seat: Lishu Town (梨树镇)

Area
  - Total: 3,900 km^{2} (1,500 sq mi)
- Elevation: 171 m (561 ft)

Population
  - Total: 800,000
  - Density: 210/km^{2} (530/sq mi)
- Time zone: UTC+8 (China Standard)
- Postal code: 136500

Lishu County (simplified Chinese: 梨树县; traditional Chinese: 梨樹縣; pinyin: Líshù Xiàn) is a county of western Jilin province, China, bordering Liaoning to the southwest. It is under the administration of Siping City, with a population of 800,000 residing in an area of 3,900 km^{2} (1,500 sq mi).

== Administrative divisions ==
Lishu County administers 17 towns and six townships.

Towns:

- Lishu (梨树镇)
- Guojiadian (郭家店镇)
- Yushutai (榆树台镇)
- Gujiazi (孤家子镇)
- Xiaochengzi (小城子镇)
- Caijia (蔡家镇)
- Mengjialing (孟家岭镇)
- Shijiabao (十家堡镇)
- Lamadian (喇嘛甸镇)
- Liujiaguanzi (刘家馆子镇)
- Wanfa (万发镇)
- Donghe (东河镇)
- Taiping (太平镇)
- Shenyang (沈洋镇)
- Sanjiazi (三家子镇)
- Linhai (林海镇)
- Xiaokuan (小宽镇)

Townships:

- Baishan Township (白山乡)
- Shengli Township (胜利乡)
- Quanyanling Township (泉眼岭乡)
- Jinshan Township (金山乡)
- Shuanghe Township (双河乡)
- Sikeshu Township (四棵树乡)

== Climate ==
Climate data for Lishu, elevation 160 m (520 ft), (1991–2020 normals, extremes 1981–2010)
Month	Jan	Feb	Mar	Apr	May	Jun	Jul	Aug	Sep	Oct	Nov	Dec	Year
Record high °C (°F)	5.2 (41.4)	16.3 (61.3)	20.7 (69.3)	29.5 (85.1)	34.6 (94.3)	37.0 (98.6)	35.6 (96.1)	35.8 (96.4)	32.0 (89.6)	27.4 (81.3)	20.5 (68.9)	12.0 (53.6)	37.0 (98.6)
Mean daily maximum °C (°F)	−8.1 (17.4)	−2.7 (27.1)	5.5 (41.9)	15.5 (59.9)	22.8 (73.0)	27.0 (80.6)	28.5 (83.3)	27.5 (81.5)	23.0 (73.4)	14.5 (58.1)	3.0 (37.4)	−5.9 (21.4)	12.5 (54.6)
Daily mean °C (°F)	−13.6 (7.5)	−8.5 (16.7)	−0.1 (31.8)	9.5 (49.1)	17.0 (62.6)	21.9 (71.4)	24.1 (75.4)	22.8 (73.0)	17.1 (62.8)	8.6 (47.5)	−1.9 (28.6)	−10.8 (12.6)	7.2 (44.9)
Mean daily minimum °C (°F)	−18.6 (−1.5)	−13.9 (7.0)	−5.5 (22.1)	3.5 (38.3)	11.2 (52.2)	16.8 (62.2)	20.0 (68.0)	18.4 (65.1)	11.3 (52.3)	3.2 (37.8)	−6.5 (20.3)	−15.4 (4.3)	2.0 (35.7)
Record low °C (°F)	−38.3 (−36.9)	−34.1 (−29.4)	−21.2 (−6.2)	−11.2 (11.8)	−2.3 (27.9)	4.0 (39.2)	10.6 (51.1)	7.1 (44.8)	−2.8 (27.0)	−17.0 (1.4)	−23.3 (−9.9)	−34.2 (−29.6)	−38.3 (−36.9)
Average precipitation mm (inches)	4.0 (0.16)	4.5 (0.18)	11.4 (0.45)	21.3 (0.84)	58.2 (2.29)	88.8 (3.50)	137.1 (5.40)	141.8 (5.58)	43.7 (1.72)	26.3 (1.04)	15.3 (0.60)	5.6 (0.22)	558 (21.98)
Average precipitation days (≥ 0.1 mm)	3.6	2.9	4.3	5.5	9.7	12.4	12.3	11.4	6.9	6.0	4.8	4.3	84.1
Average snowy days	5.2	4.3	4.7	1.7	0	0	0	0	0	1.1	4.5	6.3	27.8
Average relative humidity (%)	63	55	48	44	50	63	77	78	68	59	61	64	61
Mean monthly sunshine hours	183.1	200.9	238.5	233.3	257.1	242.6	227.0	222.4	234.9	213.7	172.1	157.9	2,583.5
Percentage possible sunshine	63	67	64	58	56	53	49	52	63	63	60	57	59
Source: China Meteorological Administration

Climate data for Gujiazi Town, Lishu, elevation 144 m (472 ft), (1991–2020 normals)
Month	Jan	Feb	Mar	Apr	May	Jun	Jul	Aug	Sep	Oct	Nov	Dec	Year
Mean daily maximum °C (°F)	−8.2 (17.2)	−2.7 (27.1)	5.4 (41.7)	15.5 (59.9)	22.8 (73.0)	27.1 (80.8)	28.5 (83.3)	27.4 (81.3)	23.0 (73.4)	14.3 (57.7)	2.7 (36.9)	−6.3 (20.7)	12.5 (54.4)
Daily mean °C (°F)	−14.3 (6.3)	−9.0 (15.8)	−0.5 (31.1)	9.3 (48.7)	16.8 (62.2)	21.9 (71.4)	24.0 (75.2)	22.6 (72.7)	16.7 (62.1)	8.3 (46.9)	−2.5 (27.5)	−11.6 (11.1)	6.8 (44.3)
Mean daily minimum °C (°F)	−19.4 (−2.9)	−14.7 (5.5)	−6.1 (21.0)	3.0 (37.4)	10.8 (51.4)	16.8 (62.2)	19.7 (67.5)	18.0 (64.4)	10.8 (51.4)	2.8 (37.0)	−7.1 (19.2)	−16.3 (2.7)	1.5 (34.7)
Average precipitation mm (inches)	3.2 (0.13)	3.5 (0.14)	10.2 (0.40)	19.1 (0.75)	50.9 (2.00)	79.7 (3.14)	128.4 (5.06)	119.8 (4.72)	47.2 (1.86)	25.0 (0.98)	12.2 (0.48)	5.1 (0.20)	504.3 (19.86)
Average precipitation days (≥ 0.1 mm)	3.6	2.7	4.1	5.4	9.9	12.1	11.9	11.3	7.1	5.7	4.8	4.6	83.2
Average snowy days	5.4	4.3	5.6	1.7	0.1	0	0	0	0	1.2	4.6	6.4	29.3
Average relative humidity (%)	62	53	46	43	49	63	78	79	69	59	60	63	60
Mean monthly sunshine hours	200.1	215.7	254.4	248.0	265.6	249.7	225.9	227.1	244.2	222.4	182.5	179.4	2,715
Percentage possible sunshine	69	72	68	61	58	54	49	53	66	66	64	65	62
Source: China Meteorological Administration
