= Tianmenshan Temple =

Buddhist temple in Zhangjiajie, Hunan, China

- 天門山寺
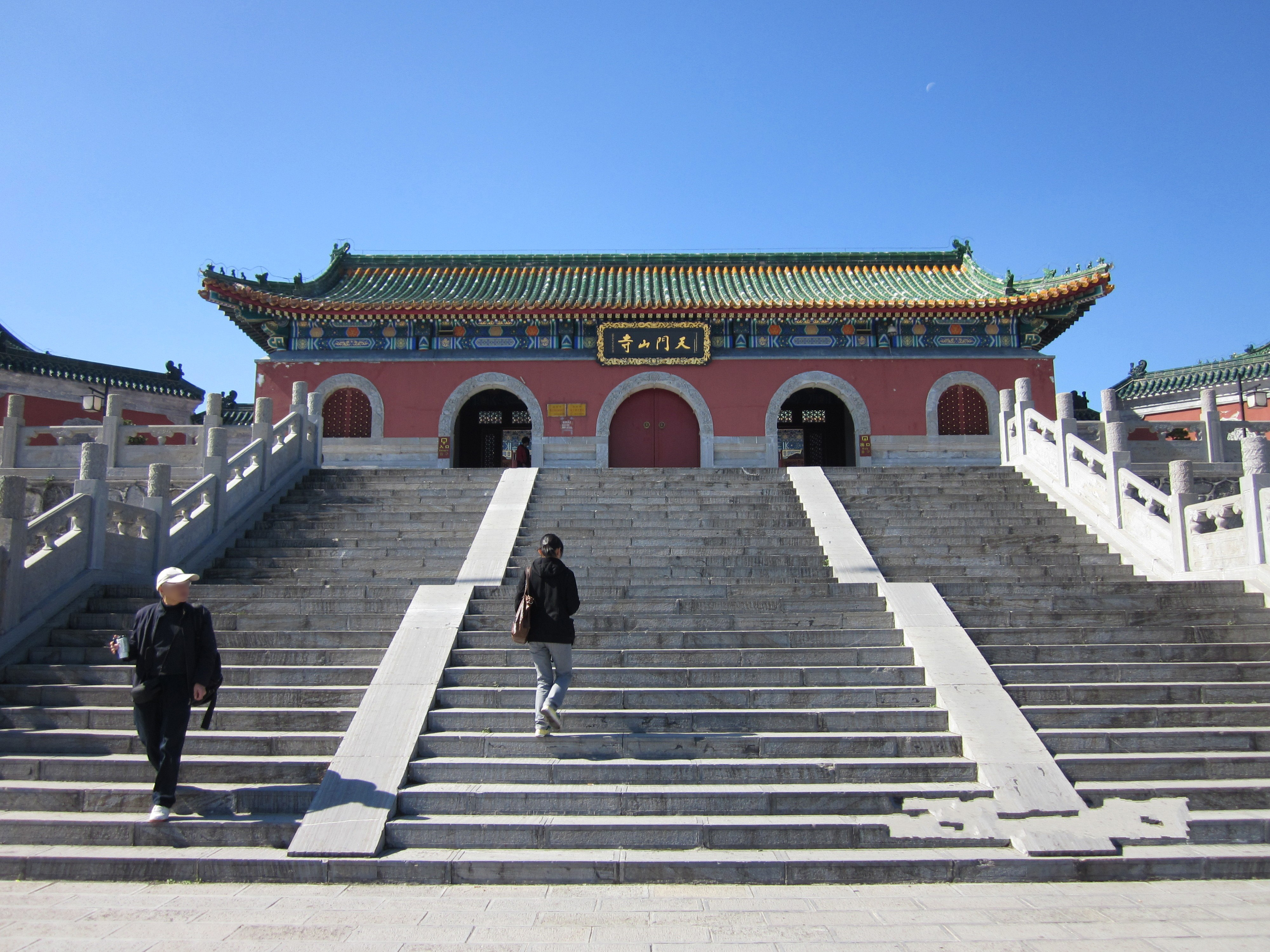
- The shanmen.

- Location within Hunan Location within China

Religion
- Affiliation: Chan Buddhism

Location
- Location: Zhangjiajie, Hunan
- Country: China
- Coordinates: 29°2′26.70″N 110°28′40.04″E

Architecture
- Completed: AD 870

Tianmenshan Temple (simplified Chinese: 天门山寺; traditional Chinese: 天門山寺; pinyin: Tiānménshān Sì) is a Buddhist temple located in Tianmen Mountain of Zhangjiajie, Hunan, China. The temple is built within grounds of some 20,000 square metres (220,000 sq ft) area.

== History ==
Tianmenshan Temple was built during the Tang dynasty (AD 870), and it was named "Lingquan Temple" (靈泉院). During the Republic of China, it was destroyed by war. After 1949, the local government rebuilt the temple. On June 8, 2009, one of the Gautama Buddha's Śarīra was stored in here.

== Architecture ==
- Daxiongbao Hall
- Guanyin Pavilion (觀音閣)
- Tianwang Hall (四大天王殿)
- Buddhist Texts Library (藏經閣)
- Bell Tower (鐘樓)
- Drum Tower (鼓樓)

== Gallery ==
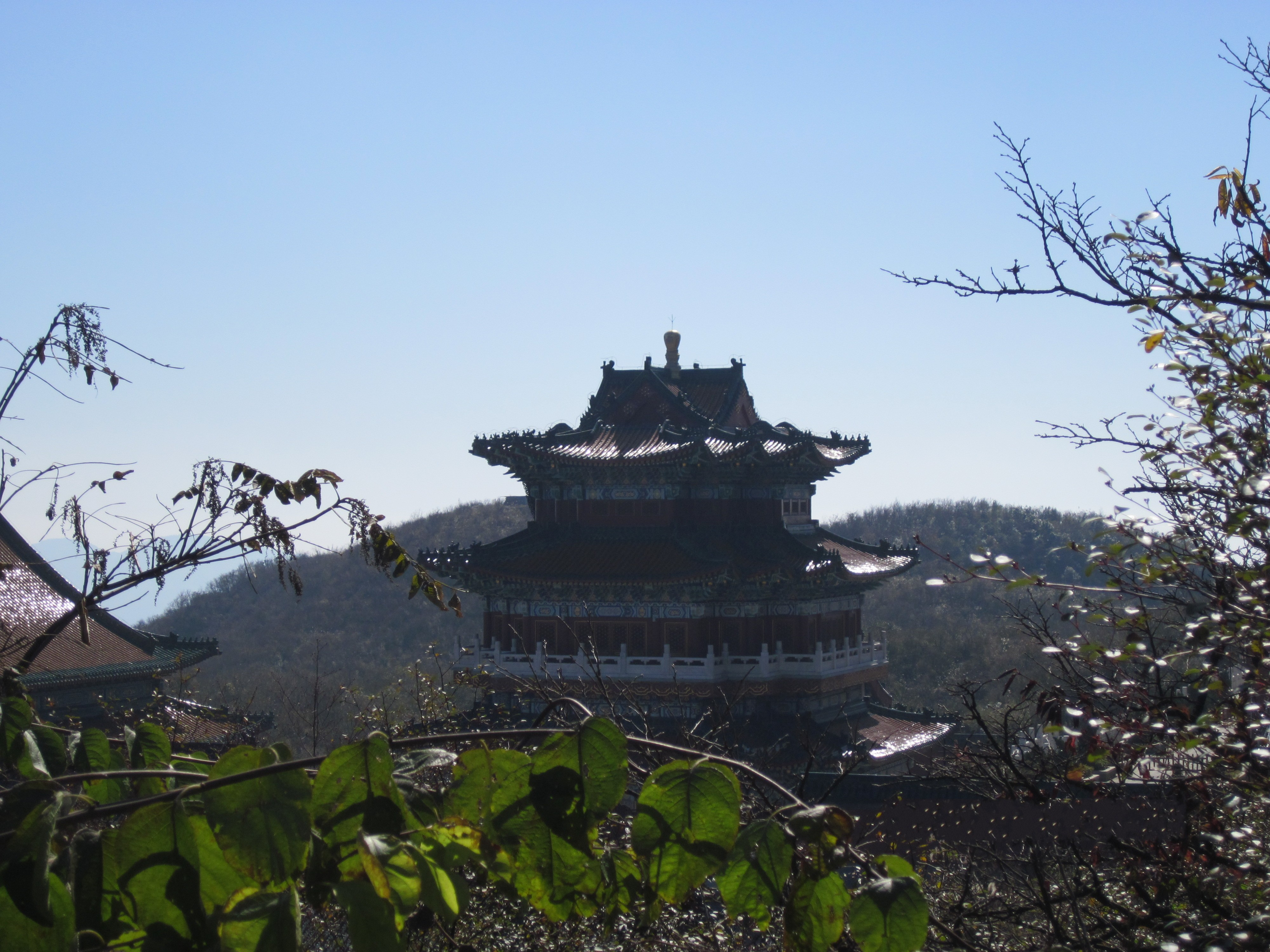
The shanmen.

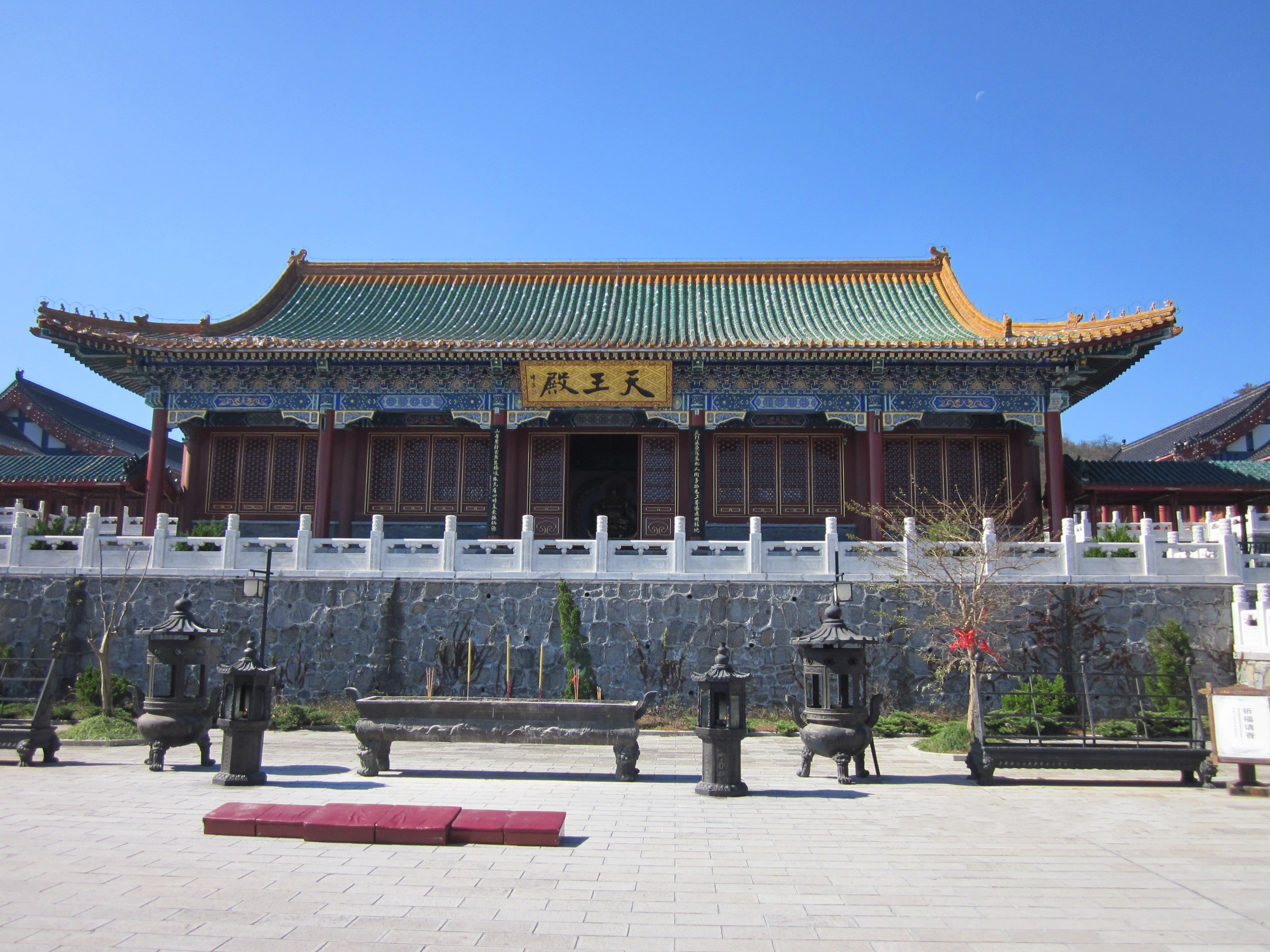
Hall of Four Heavenly Kings.

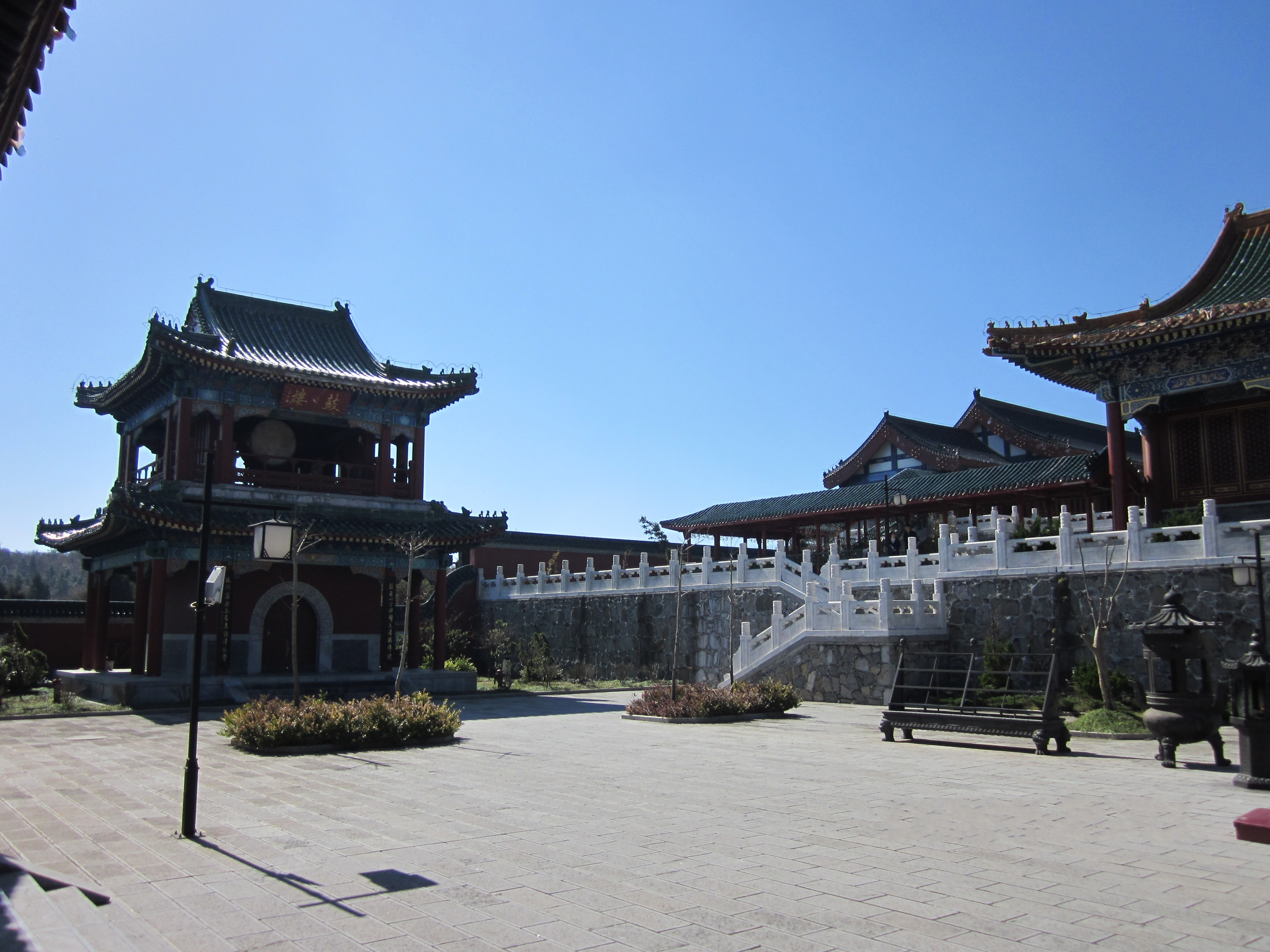
Drum Tower

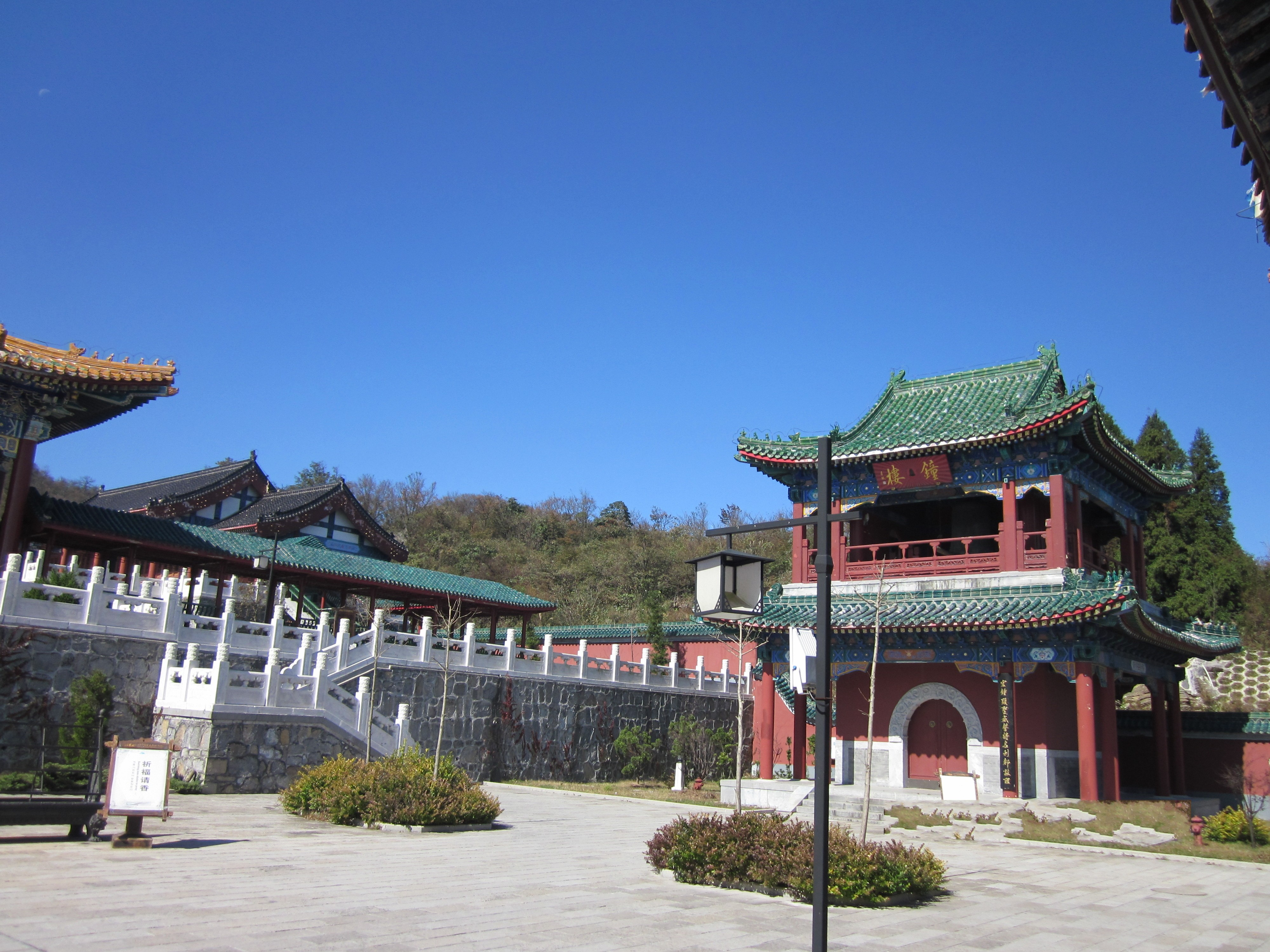
Bell Tower.

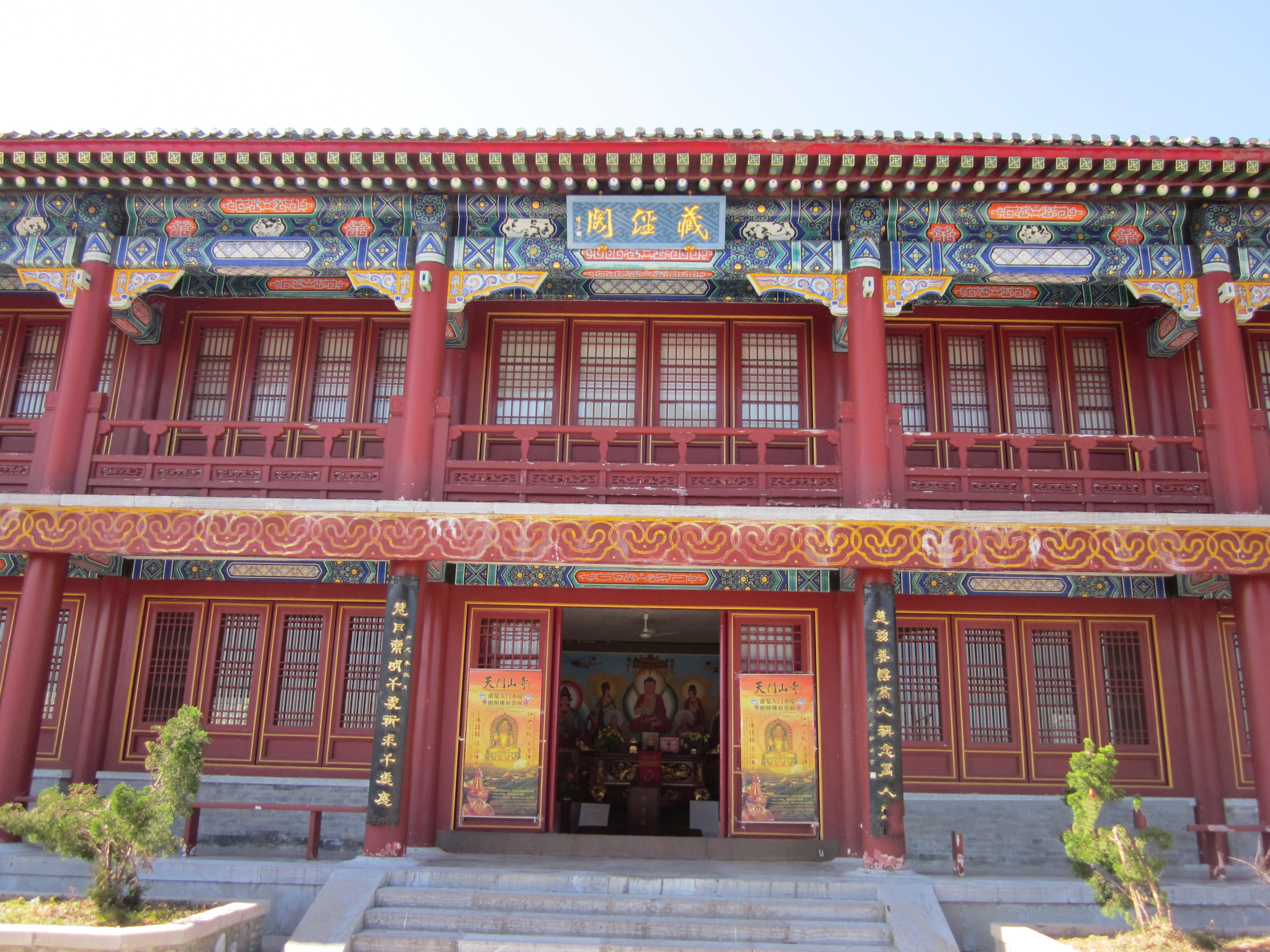
Buddhist Texts Library.

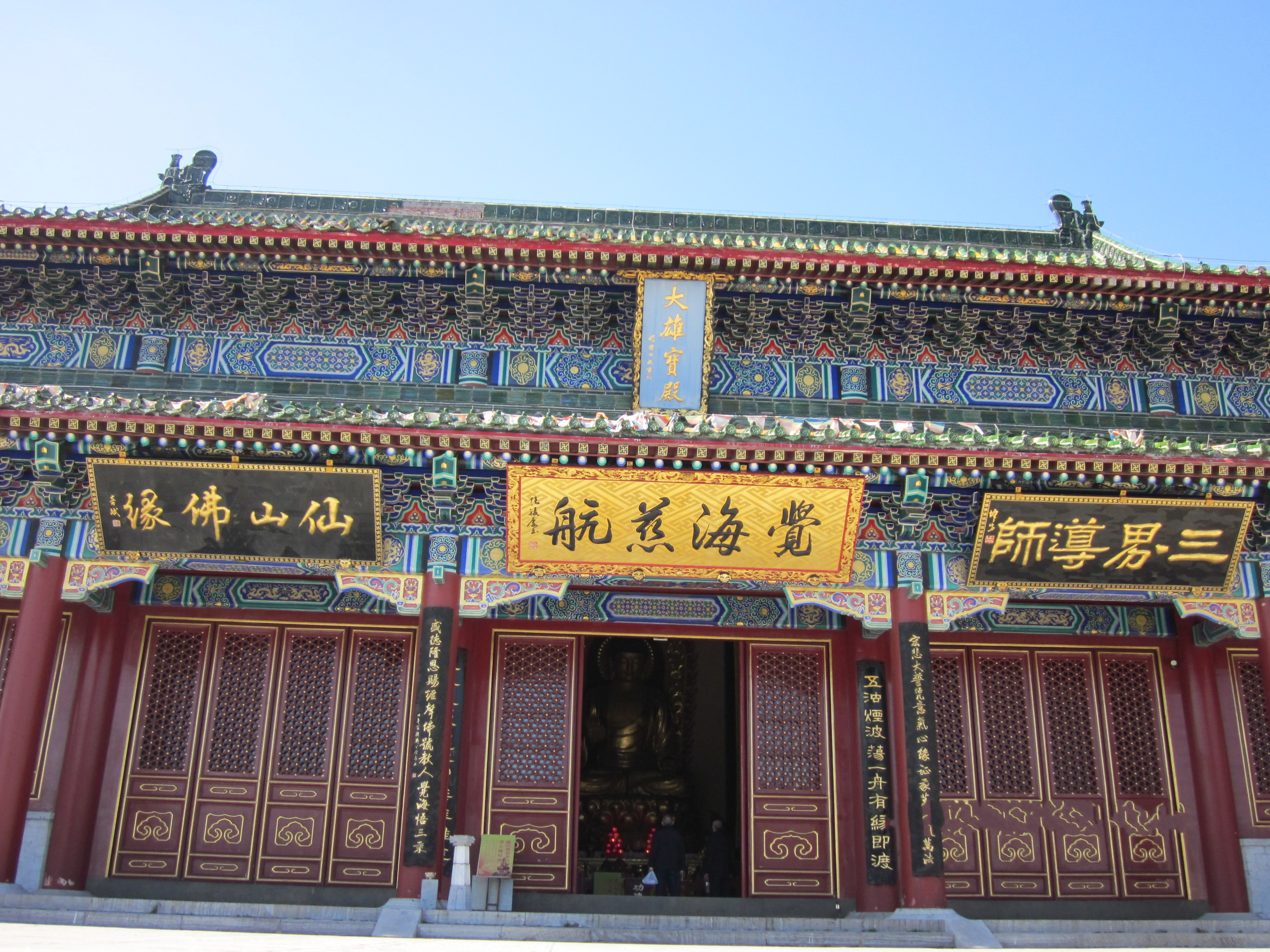
Mahavira Hall.

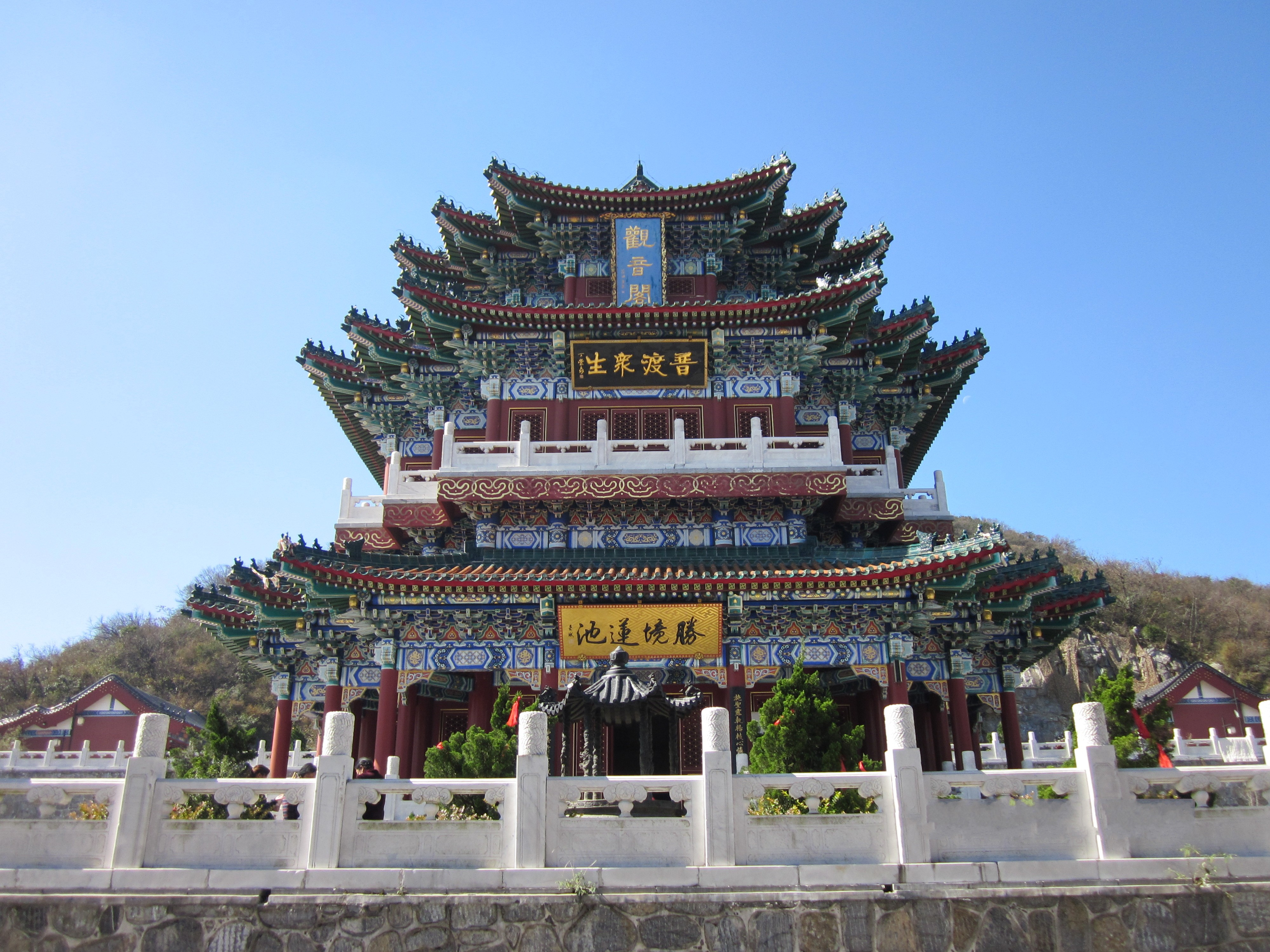
Guanyin Pavilion
