= Jianping County =

Jianping 建平县
- County
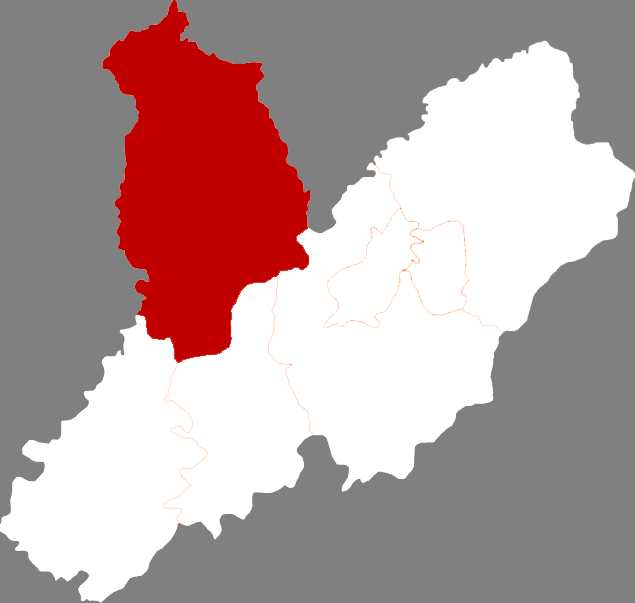
- Location in Chaoyang City

- Location of the county seat in Liaoning
- Coordinates: 41°24′N 119°39′E
- Country: People's Republic of China
- Province: Liaoning
- Prefecture-level city: Chaoyang

Area
  - Total: 4,838 km^{2} (1,868 sq mi)
- Elevation: 411 m (1,348 ft)

Population (2020 census)
  - Total: 455,826
  - Density: 94.22/km^{2} (244.0/sq mi)
- Time zone: UTC+8 (China Standard)

Jianping (Chinese: 建平; pinyin: Jiànpíng; lit. 'build peace') is a county in the west of Liaoning province, China, bordering Inner Mongolia to the north, west, and northeast. It is under the administration of Chaoyang City, the urban centre of which is more than 65 km (40 mi) to the east. The population was 455,826 in 2020.

== Administrative divisions ==
There are 11 towns, 20 townships, and one ethnic township in the county.

Towns:

- Yebaishou (叶柏寿镇)
- Zhulike (朱力科镇)
- Jianping (建平镇)
- Heishui (黑水镇)
- Kalaqin (喀喇沁镇)
- Shahai (沙海镇)
- Wanshou (万寿镇)
- Haladaokou (哈拉道口镇)
- Reshui (热水镇)
- Laoguandi (老官地镇)
- Bei'ershijiazi Hui Town (北二十家子回族镇)

Townships:

- Fushan Township (富山乡)
- Shenjing Township (深井乡)
- Yushulinzi Township (榆树林子乡)
- Gushanzi Township (孤山子乡)
- Qingsongling Township (青松岭乡)
- Yangcunling Township (杨树岭乡)
- Huizhou Township (惠州乡)
- Machang Township (马场乡)
- Luofugou Township (罗福沟乡)
- Shaoguoyingzi Township (烧锅营子乡)
- Xiangyang Township (向阳乡)
- Taipingzhuang Township (太平庄乡)
- Baishan Township (白山乡)
- Kuidesuo Township (奎德素乡)
- Zhangjiayingzi Township (张家营子乡)
- Xiaotang Township (小塘乡)
- Baijiawa Township (白家洼乡)
- Yichenggong Township (义成功乡)
- Qingfengshan Township (青峰山乡)
- Bajia Township (八家乡)
- Sanjia Mongol Ethnic Township (三家蒙古族乡)

== Climate ==
Jianping has a monsoon-influenced humid continental climate (Köppen Dwa) that barely avoids semi-arid designation (Köppen BSk), with hot and humid summers and rather long, cold, and very dry winters. More than two-thirds of the annual rainfall occurs from June thru August. Monthly 24-hour average temperatures range from −9.5 °C (14.9 °F) in January to 24.4 °C (75.9 °F) in July, for an annual average of 8.8 °C (47.8 °F). The frost-free period lasts 120 to 155 days.

Climate data for Jianping, elevation 462 m (1,516 ft), (1991–2020 normals, extremes 1971–2010)
Month	Jan	Feb	Mar	Apr	May	Jun	Jul	Aug	Sep	Oct	Nov	Dec	Year
Record high °C (°F)	12.4 (54.3)	20.0 (68.0)	26.9 (80.4)	33.2 (91.8)	39.2 (102.6)	38.9 (102.0)	42.3 (108.1)	40.9 (105.6)	35.3 (95.5)	31.6 (88.9)	21.8 (71.2)	17.5 (63.5)	42.3 (108.1)
Mean daily maximum °C (°F)	−1.9 (28.6)	2.4 (36.3)	9.5 (49.1)	18.1 (64.6)	24.9 (76.8)	28.4 (83.1)	30.1 (86.2)	29.1 (84.4)	24.7 (76.5)	16.9 (62.4)	6.8 (44.2)	−0.3 (31.5)	15.7 (60.3)
Daily mean °C (°F)	−9.0 (15.8)	−4.9 (23.2)	2.5 (36.5)	11.3 (52.3)	18.3 (64.9)	22.3 (72.1)	24.6 (76.3)	23.2 (73.8)	17.7 (63.9)	9.8 (49.6)	0.1 (32.2)	−7.0 (19.4)	9.1 (48.3)
Mean daily minimum °C (°F)	−14.3 (6.3)	−10.7 (12.7)	−3.7 (25.3)	4.6 (40.3)	11.7 (53.1)	16.5 (61.7)	19.6 (67.3)	18.1 (64.6)	11.6 (52.9)	3.7 (38.7)	−5.0 (23.0)	−12.1 (10.2)	3.3 (38.0)
Record low °C (°F)	−27.9 (−18.2)	−24.6 (−12.3)	−18.7 (−1.7)	−7.9 (17.8)	−0.4 (31.3)	6.4 (43.5)	12.5 (54.5)	9.3 (48.7)	0.3 (32.5)	−8.6 (16.5)	−20.0 (−4.0)	−25.7 (−14.3)	−27.9 (−18.2)
Average precipitation mm (inches)	1.3 (0.05)	2.0 (0.08)	6.7 (0.26)	22.8 (0.90)	44.5 (1.75)	92.9 (3.66)	128.8 (5.07)	88.7 (3.49)	36.1 (1.42)	24.5 (0.96)	9.8 (0.39)	1.5 (0.06)	459.6 (18.09)
Average precipitation days (≥ 0.1 mm)	1.6	1.6	2.9	4.8	7.6	11.4	12.7	11.0	7.3	4.4	2.7	1.3	69.3
Average snowy days	2.2	2.5	3.3	1.5	0	0	0	0	0	0.8	3.2	2.4	15.9
Average relative humidity (%)	45	40	36	38	43	59	69	70	60	52	50	48	51
Mean monthly sunshine hours	209.8	207.3	242.4	249.6	272.1	242.6	233.3	244.3	243.5	229.0	188.1	195.8	2,757.8
Percentage possible sunshine	70	69	65	62	60	54	51	58	66	68	64	69	63
Source 1: China Meteorological Administration
Source 2: Weather China

Climate data for Jianping Town, Jianping County, elevation 662 m (2,172 ft), (1991–2020 normals)
Month	Jan	Feb	Mar	Apr	May	Jun	Jul	Aug	Sep	Oct	Nov	Dec	Year
Mean daily maximum °C (°F)	−4.4 (24.1)	−0.2 (31.6)	7.0 (44.6)	15.7 (60.3)	22.7 (72.9)	26.5 (79.7)	28.3 (82.9)	27.2 (81.0)	22.7 (72.9)	14.7 (58.5)	4.4 (39.9)	−2.9 (26.8)	13.5 (56.3)
Daily mean °C (°F)	−13.6 (7.5)	−9.0 (15.8)	−0.9 (30.4)	8.4 (47.1)	15.8 (60.4)	20.2 (68.4)	22.5 (72.5)	20.8 (69.4)	14.9 (58.8)	6.7 (44.1)	−3.4 (25.9)	−11.5 (11.3)	5.9 (42.6)
Mean daily minimum °C (°F)	−20.8 (−5.4)	−16.6 (2.1)	−8.6 (16.5)	0.5 (32.9)	8.0 (46.4)	13.6 (56.5)	16.8 (62.2)	14.6 (58.3)	7.4 (45.3)	−0.5 (31.1)	−10.0 (14.0)	−18.4 (−1.1)	−1.2 (29.9)
Average precipitation mm (inches)	1.5 (0.06)	2.2 (0.09)	6.7 (0.26)	19.7 (0.78)	50.2 (1.98)	90.2 (3.55)	117.9 (4.64)	74.0 (2.91)	36.1 (1.42)	25.8 (1.02)	8.3 (0.33)	1.7 (0.07)	434.3 (17.11)
Average precipitation days (≥ 0.1 mm)	1.7	1.7	3.0	5.0	8.0	12.4	12.3	9.7	6.4	4.9	2.9	1.8	69.8
Average snowy days	2.3	3.0	4.1	2.3	0.2	0	0	0	0	1.7	3.2	3.0	19.8
Average relative humidity (%)	53	46	41	41	47	62	75	76	68	58	56	56	57
Mean monthly sunshine hours	215.5	213.4	249.9	250.4	280.4	256.2	255.7	260.3	252.3	239.8	200.5	202.3	2,876.7
Percentage possible sunshine	73	71	67	62	62	56	56	61	68	71	69	72	66
Source: China Meteorological Administration
