= Baishan, Guangxi =

Baishan 白山镇
- Town
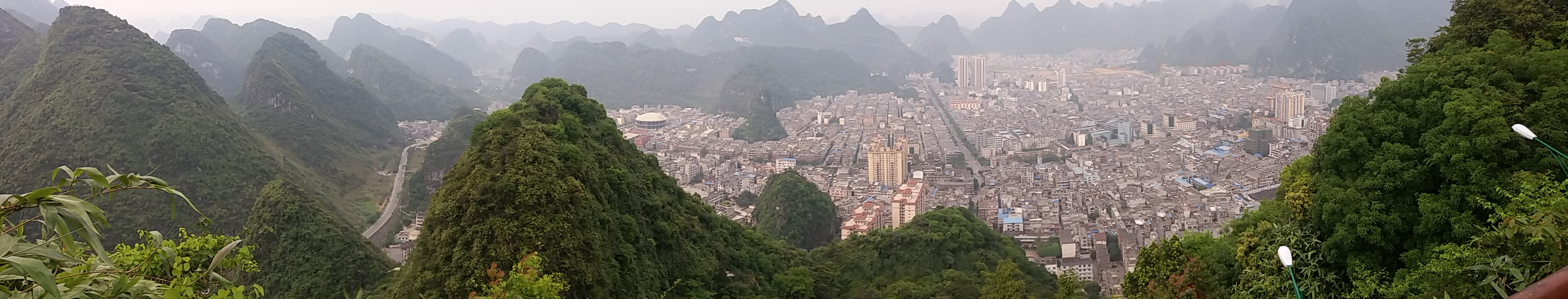
- Baishan in April 2018

- Location in Guangxi
- Coordinates: 23°42′46″N 108°9′49″E
- Country: People's Republic of China
- Autonomous Region: Guangxi
- Prefecture-level city: Nanning
- County: Mashan County
- Time zone: UTC+8 (China Standard)

Baishan (Chinese: 白山; pinyin: Báishān) is a town under the administration of Mashan County, Guangxi, China. As of 2023, it administers the following ten residential communities and thirteen villages:

- Xihua Community (西华社区)
- Sida Community (四达社区)
- Zhenbei Community (镇北社区)
- Tongfu Community (同富社区)
- Zhongxue Community (中学社区)
- Xinxing Community (新兴社区)
- Hequn Community (合群社区)
- Hezuo Community (合作社区)
- Hecheng Community (合诚社区)
- Hefu Community (合福社区)
- Xinhan Village (新汉村)
- Shangxin Village (尚新村)
- Shanglong Village (上龙村)
- Datong Village (大同村)
- Neixue Village (内学村)
- Zaohua Village (造华村)
- Lixing Village (立星村)
- Xinghua Village (兴华村)
- Yuye Village (玉业村)
- Minxin Village (民新村)
- Guyao Village (古腰村)
- Sanlian Village (三联村)
- Minzu Village (民族村)
