= Baishan Township, Sichuan =

Baishan Township 白山乡
- Township
- Location in Sichuan
- Coordinates: 32°1′3″N 106°23′42″E
- Country: People's Republic of China
- Province: Sichuan
- Prefecture-level city: Guangyuan
- County: Cangxi County
- Village-level divisions: 1 residential community, 6 villages
- Time zone: UTC+8 (China Standard)

Baishan Township (simplified Chinese: 白山乡; traditional Chinese: 白山鄉; pinyin: Báishān Xiāng) is a township of Cangxi County, Sichuan province, China. As of 2023, it has one residential community and six villages under its administration: Longfeng Community (龙凤社区), Chezi Village (车子村), Tiannan Village (天南村), Baozhai Village (宝寨村), Hongmiao Village (红庙村), Feifeng Village (飞凤村), and Cansi Village (蚕丝村).

== See also ==
- List of township-level divisions of Sichuan
