= Baishan, Heilongjiang =

Baishan 白山镇
- Town
- Location in Heilongjiang
- Coordinates: 47°16′10″N 123°14′42″E
- Country: People's Republic of China
- Province: Heilongjiang
- Prefecture-level city: Qiqihar
- County: Longjiang County
- Time zone: UTC+8 (China Standard)

Baishan (Chinese: 白山; pinyin: Báishān) is a town under the administration of Longjiang County, Heilongjiang, China. As of 2023, it administers the following nine villages:

- Dongbaitu Village (东白土村)
- Longha Village (龙哈村)
- Changshan Village (长山村)
- Xinglonggang Village (兴隆岗村)
- Houdaolao Village (后道老村)
- Wu (Fifth) Village (五村)
- Liu (Sixth) Village (六村)
- Qi (Seventh) Village (七村)
- Ba (Eighth) Village (八村)
