= Suixi County, Anhui =

Coordinates: 33°42′53″N 116°44′38″E

Suixi 濉溪县
- County
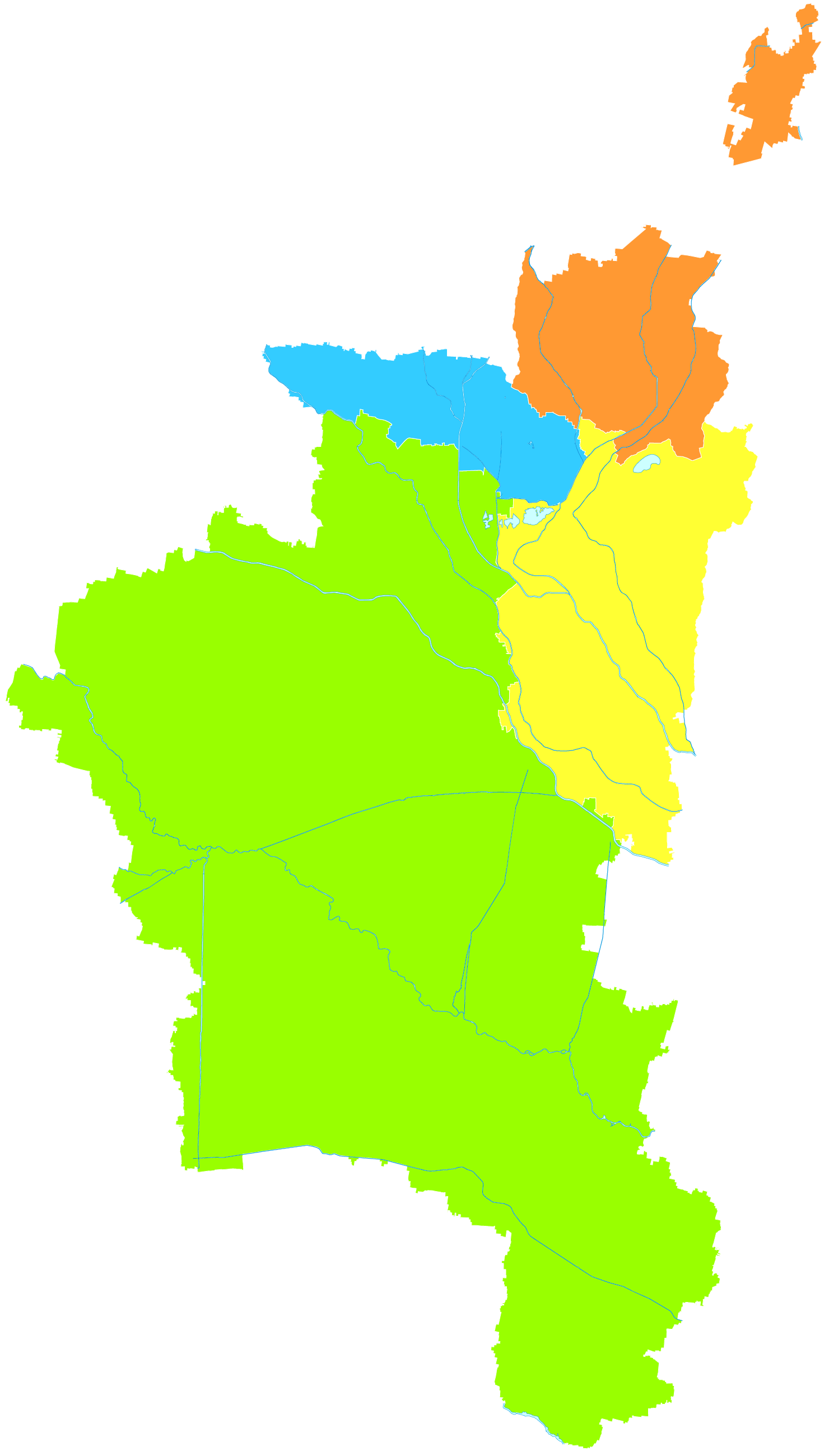
- Suixi is the southernmost, largest division in this map of Huaibei

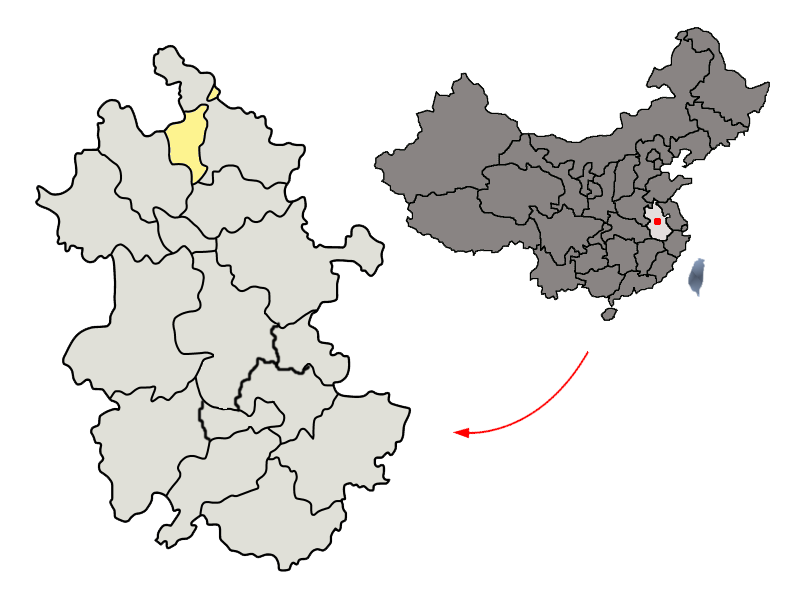
- Huaibei in Anhui
- Country: China
- Province: Anhui
- Prefecture-level city: Huaibei
- County seat: Suixi Town

Area
  - Total: 1,987 km^{2} (767 sq mi)

Population (2020)
  - Total: 932,402
  - Density: 469.3/km^{2} (1,215/sq mi)
- Time zone: UTC+8 (China Standard)
- Postal code: 235100

Suixi County (Chinese: 濉溪县; pinyin: Suīxī Xiàn) is a county in the north of Anhui Province, China, bordering Henan province to the southeast. It is under the administration of Huaibei City.

== Administrative divisions ==
Suixi County is divided to 11 towns.

- Suixi (濉溪镇)
- Liuqiao (刘桥镇)
- Shuangduiji (双堆集镇)
- Baishan (百善镇)
- Nanping (南坪镇)
- Wugou (五沟镇)
- Linhuan (临涣镇)
- Hancun (韩村镇)
- Tiefo (铁佛镇)
- Sunting (孙曈镇)
- Sipu (四铺镇)

== Climate ==
Climate data for Suixi, elevation 32 m (105 ft), (1991–2020 normals, extremes 1981–present)
Month	Jan	Feb	Mar	Apr	May	Jun	Jul	Aug	Sep	Oct	Nov	Dec	Year
Record high °C (°F)	18.1 (64.6)	25.5 (77.9)	32.1 (89.8)	33.0 (91.4)	36.6 (97.9)	39.7 (103.5)	39.7 (103.5)	38.3 (100.9)	36.8 (98.2)	34.1 (93.4)	27.4 (81.3)	21.5 (70.7)	39.7 (103.5)
Mean daily maximum °C (°F)	6.0 (42.8)	9.5 (49.1)	14.9 (58.8)	21.4 (70.5)	26.7 (80.1)	31.2 (88.2)	32.0 (89.6)	30.8 (87.4)	27.4 (81.3)	22.3 (72.1)	14.8 (58.6)	8.2 (46.8)	20.4 (68.8)
Daily mean °C (°F)	1.1 (34.0)	4.1 (39.4)	9.5 (49.1)	15.7 (60.3)	21.1 (70.0)	25.7 (78.3)	27.6 (81.7)	26.7 (80.1)	22.2 (72.0)	16.6 (61.9)	9.3 (48.7)	3.0 (37.4)	15.2 (59.4)
Mean daily minimum °C (°F)	−2.9 (26.8)	−0.3 (31.5)	4.4 (39.9)	10.1 (50.2)	15.6 (60.1)	20.6 (69.1)	24.0 (75.2)	23.2 (73.8)	18.0 (64.4)	11.5 (52.7)	4.7 (40.5)	−1.1 (30.0)	10.7 (51.2)
Record low °C (°F)	−13.7 (7.3)	−18.2 (−0.8)	−8.0 (17.6)	−2.5 (27.5)	5.6 (42.1)	11.6 (52.9)	16.7 (62.1)	13.7 (56.7)	7.4 (45.3)	−1.2 (29.8)	−9.1 (15.6)	−17.8 (0.0)	−18.2 (−0.8)
Average precipitation mm (inches)	15.9 (0.63)	18.6 (0.73)	33.9 (1.33)	41.9 (1.65)	69.0 (2.72)	113.1 (4.45)	208.2 (8.20)	155.9 (6.14)	62.9 (2.48)	42.6 (1.68)	33.3 (1.31)	16.6 (0.65)	811.9 (31.97)
Average precipitation days (≥ 0.1 mm)	4.5	5.9	5.8	7.0	7.6	7.8	12.9	11.7	8.1	5.9	5.9	4.2	87.3
Average snowy days	3.1	2.7	0.9	0	0	0	0	0	0	0	0.6	1.2	8.5
Average relative humidity (%)	68	65	64	65	68	67	79	81	77	71	72	69	71
Mean monthly sunshine hours	142.0	142.0	185.2	212.1	222.7	204.0	188.8	186.0	168.6	178.1	156.7	150.6	2,136.8
Percentage possible sunshine	45	45	50	54	52	47	43	45	46	51	51	49	48
Source: China Meteorological Administration
