= Baishan, Lujiang County =

Baishan 白山镇
- Town
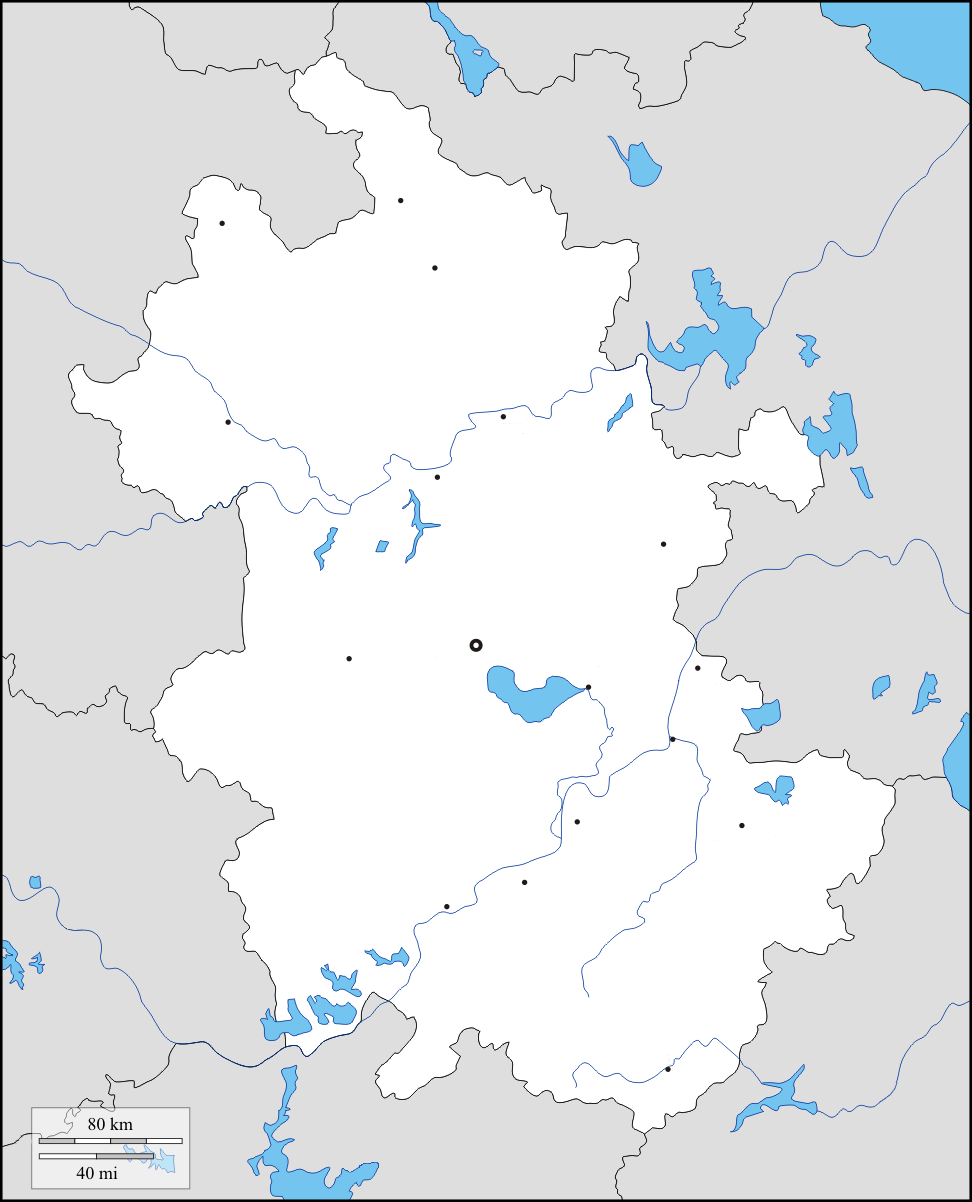
- Location in Anhui
- Coordinates: 31°27′23″N 117°23′48″E
- Country: People's Republic of China
- Province: Anhui
- Prefecture-level city: Hefei
- County: Lujiang County
- Time zone: UTC+8 (China Standard)

Baishan (Chinese: 白山; pinyin: Báishān) is a town under the administration of Lujiang County, Anhui, China. As of 2023, it administers Baishan Community, Daiqiao Community (戴桥社区), and the following nine villages:

- Jiulian Village (九联村)
- Tongchun Village (同春村)
- Jinshen Village (金沈村)
- Xinggang Village (兴岗村)
- Juehai Village (觉海村)
- Shilian Village (十联村)
- Jiming Village (鸡鸣村)
- Wu'ai Village (五爱村)
- Ma'an Village (马鞍村)
