= Baishan, Suixi County =

Baishan 百善镇
- Town
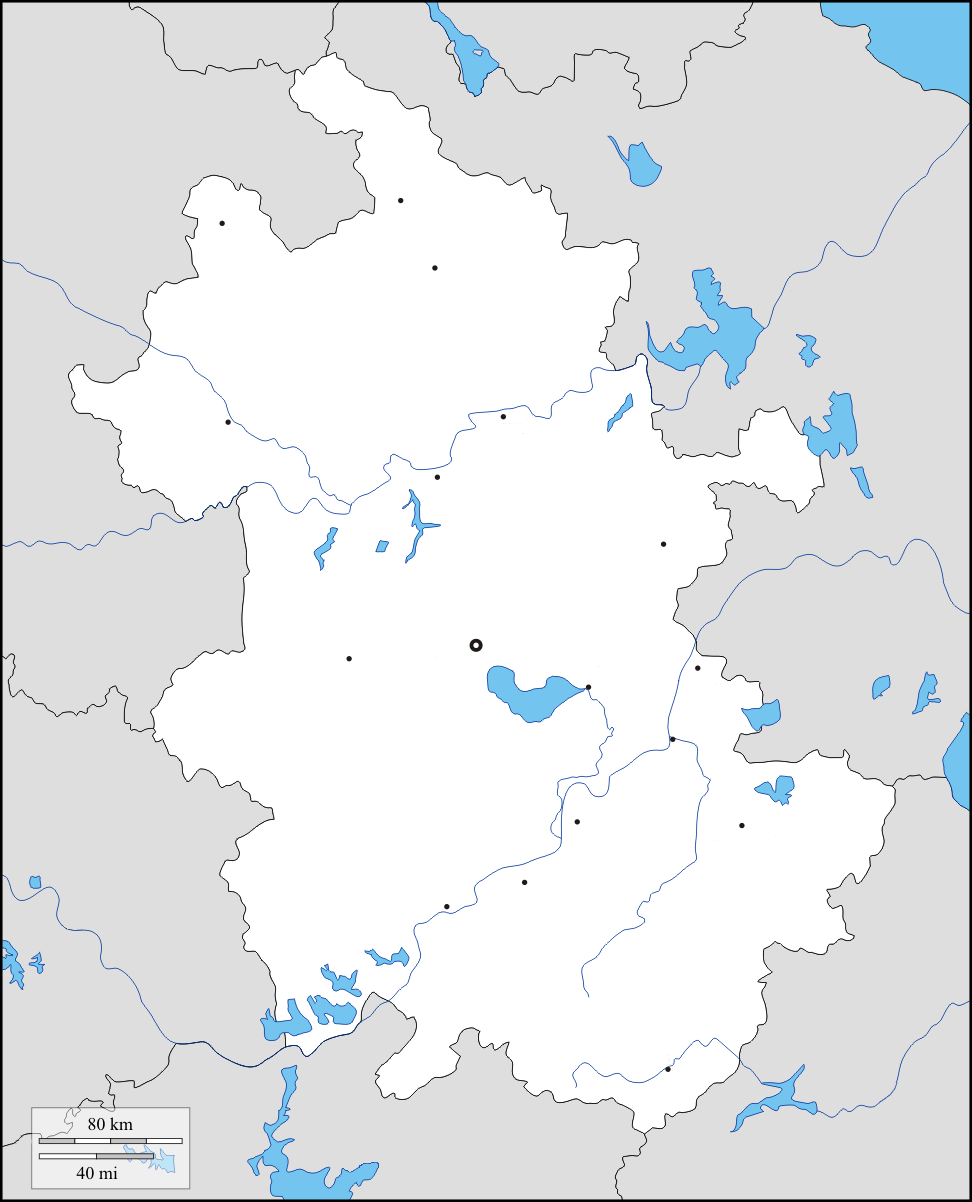
- Location in Anhui
- Coordinates: 33°46′55″N 116°40′19″E
- Country: People's Republic of China
- Province: Anhui
- Prefecture-level city: Huaibei
- County: Suixi County
- Time zone: UTC+8 (China Standard)

Baishan (Chinese: 百善; pinyin: Bǎishàn) is a town under the administration of Suixi County, Anhui, China. As of 2023, it administers Ludian Agricultural Area (鲁店农场), Tulou Agricultural Area (土楼农场), and the following 22 villages:

- Baishan Village
- Songmiao Village (宋庙村)
- Ludian Village (鲁店村)
- Qiaotou Village (桥头村)
- Liuzi Village (柳孜村)
- Wangsi Village (王司村)
- Huangxinzhuang Village (黄新庄村)
- Qianying Village (前营村)
- Cha'an Village (茶安村)
- Daokou Village (道口村)
- Yeliuhu Village (叶刘湖村)
- Qingwei Village (青卫村)
- Maxiang Village (马乡村)
- Zhangzhuang Village (张庄村)
- Longbei Village (龙北村)
- Longqiao Village (龙桥村)
- Longtuo Village (龙沱村)
- Guotun Village (郭屯村)
- Dinglou Village (丁楼村)
- Weibo Village (苇菠村)
- Yanji Village (闫集村)
- Xulou Village (徐楼村)
