= Baishan Township, Jilin =

Baishan Township 白山乡
- Township
- Location in Jilin
- Coordinates: 43°22′43″N 124°17′48″E
- Country: People's Republic of China
- Province: Jilin
- Prefecture-level city: Siping
- County: Lishu County
- Village-level divisions: 13 villages
- Time zone: UTC+8 (China Standard)

Baishan Township (simplified Chinese: 白山乡; traditional Chinese: 白山鄉; pinyin: Báishān Xiāng) is a township of Lishu County in western Jilin province, China. As of 2023, it has thirteen villages under its administration:

- Peijia Village (裴家村)
- Baojia Village (鲍家村)
- Laoshantou Village (老山头村)
- Liujiawopu Village (刘家窝堡村)
- Daquanyan Village (大泉眼村)
- Sihe Village (四合村)
- Xibaishan Village (西白山村)
- Shijiapu Village (石家堡村)
- Suijia Village (隋家村)
- Zhengjia Village (郑家村)
- Dongfeng Village (东风村)
- Youyi Village (友谊村)
- Pingshan Village (平山村)

== See also ==
- List of township-level divisions of Jilin
