= Longxing, Heilongjiang =

Longxing
- Town

Chinese transcription(s)
  - Chinese: 龙兴镇
- Location in Heilongjiang Longxing (China)
- Coordinates: 47°29′23.19″N 122°45′37.7532″E
- Country: China
- Province: Heilongjiang
- Prefecture: Qiqihar
- County: Longjiang
- Time zone: UTC+8 (China Standard Time)

Longxing is a town situated in the Chinese province of Heilongjiang, China.

It is located in Longjiang County which is under the jurisdiction of Qiqihar city in the west of Heilongjiang province. It is located about 95 kilometers east of Qiqihar City. It contains the abandoned Red Sun Kindergarten.

== Administrative divisions ==
The township-level division contains the following villages:

Fuxingcun-福兴村

Longxingcun-龙兴村

Menggutun-蒙古屯

== See also ==
- List of township-level divisions of Heilongjiang
