= Baishan Township, Liaoning =

Baishan Township 白山乡
- Township
- Location in Liaoning
- Coordinates: 41°45′19″N 119°26′40″E
- Country: People's Republic of China
- Province: Liaoning
- Prefecture-level city: Chaoyang
- County: Jianping County
- Village-level divisions: 7 villages
- Time zone: UTC+8 (China Standard)

Baishan Township (simplified Chinese: 白山乡; traditional Chinese: 白山鄉; pinyin: Báishān Xiāng) is a township of Jianping County in western Liaoning province, China. As of 2023, it has seven villages under its administration: Changhanchi Village (长汉池村), Gahaitu Village (嘎海吐村), Dongcheng Village (东城村), Xicheng Village (西城村), Xiashuiquan Village (下水泉村), Wazigou Village (洼子沟村), and Danzhoucheng Village (旦洲城村).

== See also ==
- List of township-level divisions of Liaoning
