= Guanyin Hall =

Hall in Chinese, Korean, Japanese and Vietnamese Buddhist temples

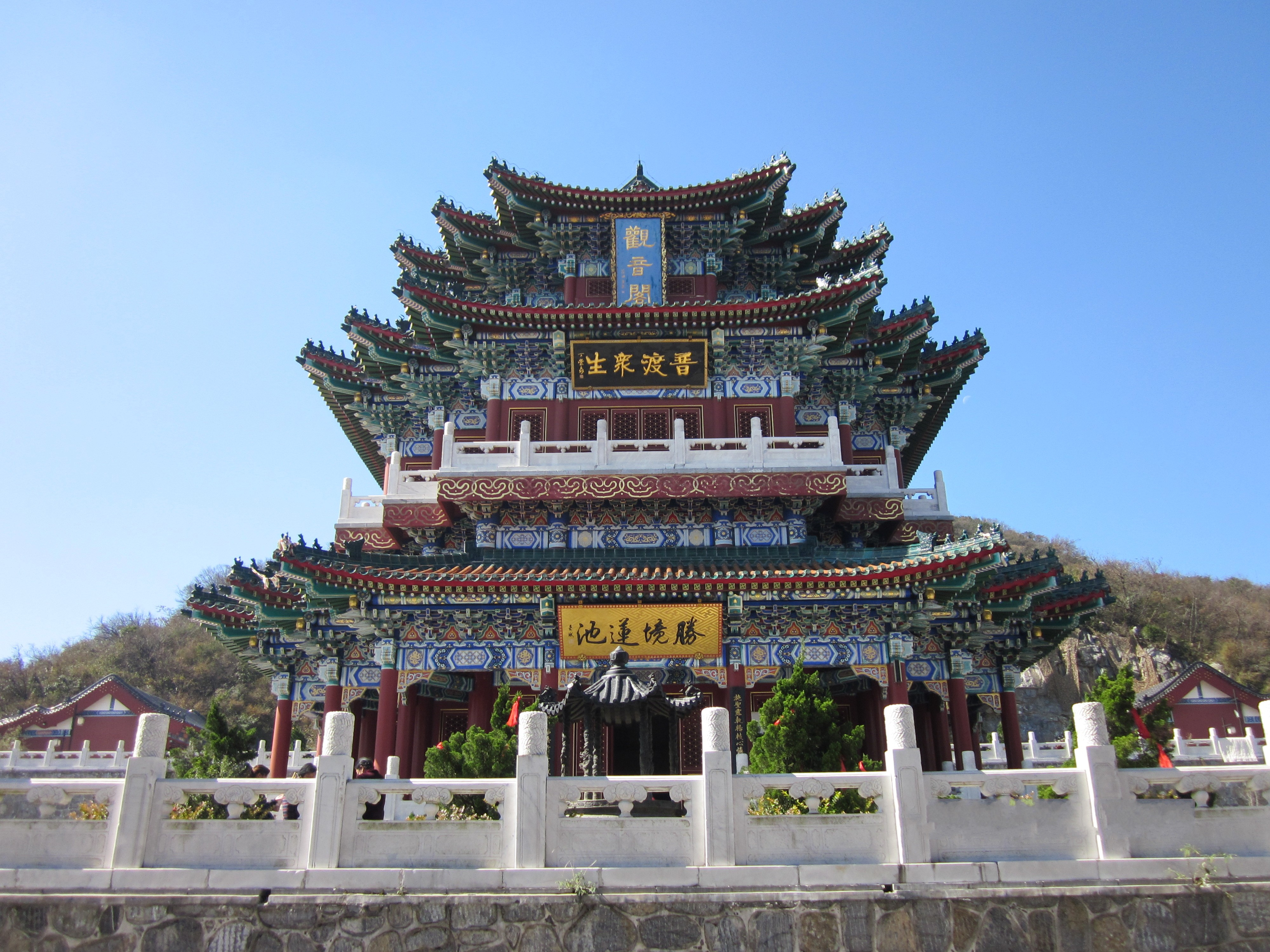
- The Guanyin Hall at Tianmenshan Temple, in Zhangjiajie, Hunan, China.

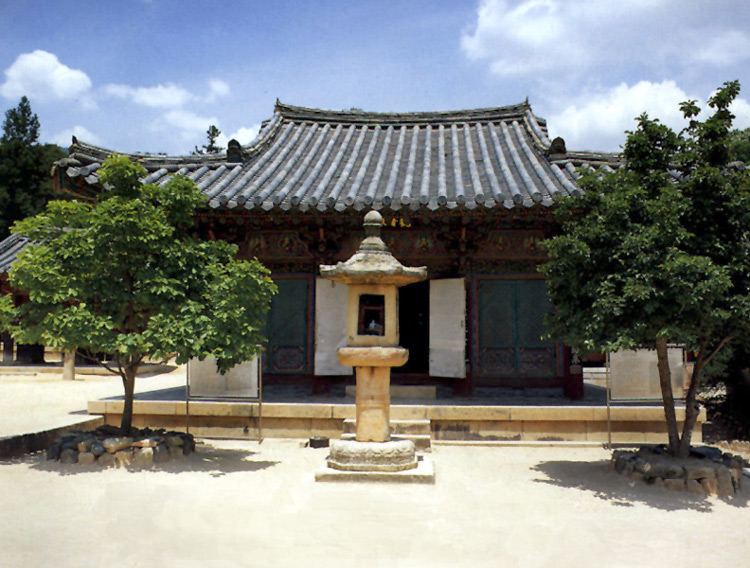
- Gwaneumjeon of Tongdosa

Chinese name
- Simplified Chinese: 观音殿
- Traditional Chinese: 觀音殿
- Literal meaning: Hall of Guanyin
Transcriptions
Standard Mandarin
- Hanyu Pinyin: Guānyīndiàn

Korean name
- Hangul: 관음전

The Guanyin Hall (simplified Chinese: 观音殿; traditional Chinese: 觀音殿; pinyin: Guānyīndiàn) is a building that enshrines Avalokiteśvara in East Asian Buddhist temples. It is the most important annex hall in Chinese temples. Guanyin, also called "Guanshiyin" (觀世音), "Guanshizizai" (觀世自在), "Guanzizai" (觀自在), is the attendant of Amitabha and one of the "Western Three Saints" (西方三聖). Guanyin is the bodhisattva most associated with the Buddhist principle of compassion and mercy. According to Chapter of the Universal Gate of Avalokiteśvara Bodhisattva (《觀世音菩薩普門品》), if people are in danger, they just need to call his name and he will hear them and go to save them. Since he has many manifestations, different places enshrine different statues of Sheng Guanyin (圣觀音), Guanzizai (觀自在), and Thousand-armed and eyed Guanyin (千手千眼觀音菩薩).

In certain temples, the hall is also alternatively called the Guanyin Pavilion (simplified Chinese: 观音阁; traditional Chinese: 觀音閣; pinyin: Guānyīn gé), the Hall of Great Compassion (Chinese: 大悲殿; pinyin: Dàbēi diàn) or the Pavilion of Great Compassion (simplified Chinese: 大悲阁; traditional Chinese: 大悲閣; pinyin: Dàbēi gè).

In Korea, the building is called gwaneumjeon (관음전), wontongjeon (원통전; 圓通殿) or wontongbojeon (원통보전; 圓通寶殿) as Gwaneum eliminates the agony of living things smoothly and flexibly (주원융통; 周圓融通). A notable example is wontongjeon of Gaemoksa which is designated as treasure.

== Statues ==
=== Sheng Guanyin ===
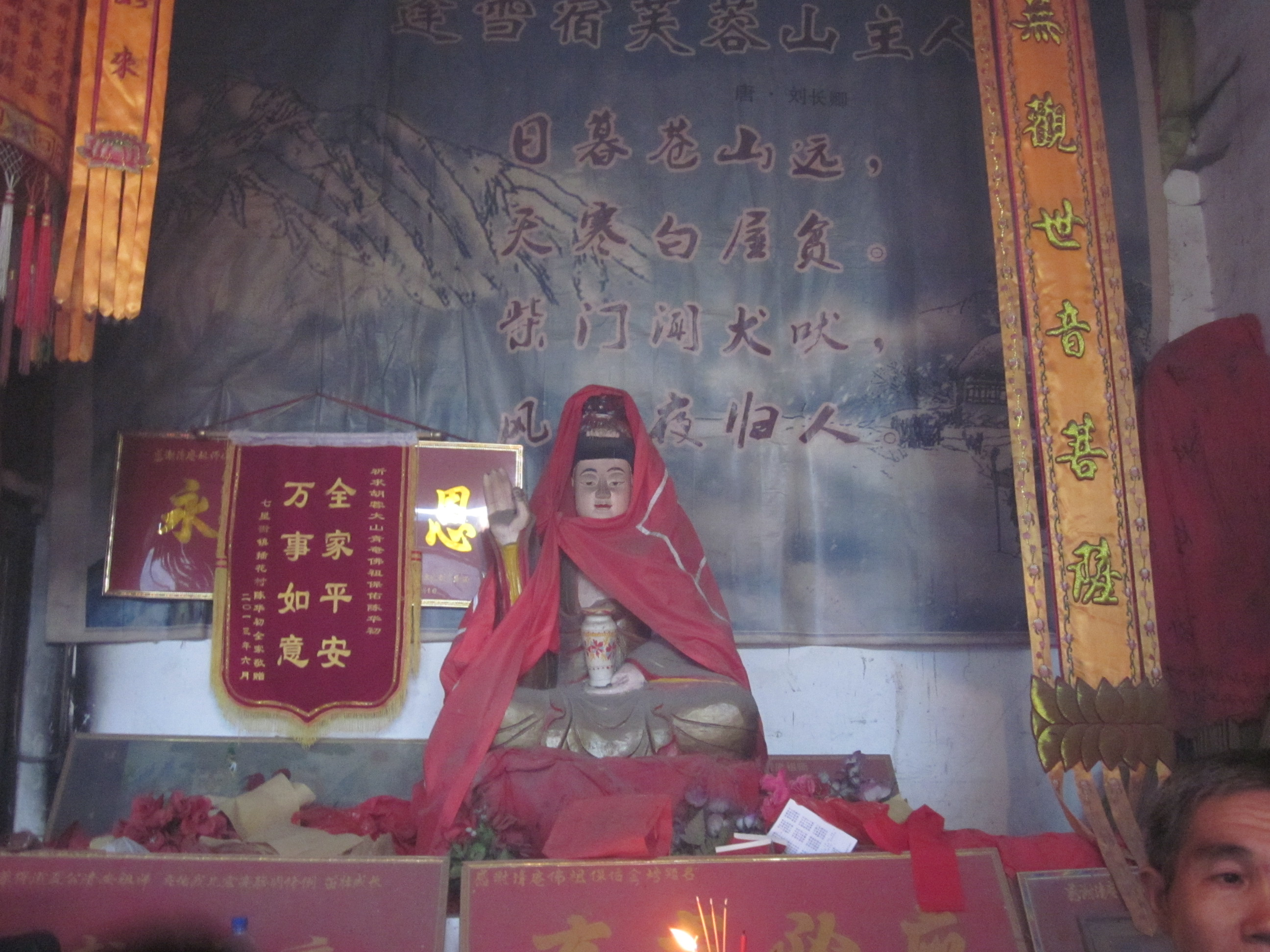
Sitting Statue of Holy Guanyin.

Sheng Guanyin (Traditional Chinese: 聖觀音, pinyin: Shèng Guānyīndiàn, lit: "Holy Guanyin") is the primary manifestation of the Bodhisattva Guanyin. Statues of this manifestation often portrays her sitting in the lotus posture with a lotus or the Yujingping in hand, wearing Keyura, necklaces and decorations and a precious crown on the head. There is a sitting statue of Amitabha (阿彌陀佛) on the crown, which is the main symbol of Guanyin.

=== Guanzizai ===
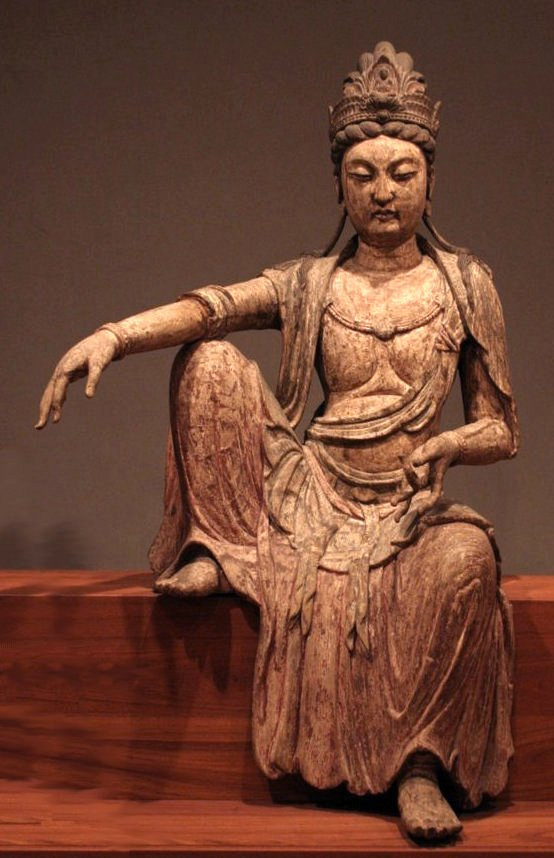
Northern Song dynasty wood carving of Guanzizai, c. 1025. Male bodhisattva depiction with Amitābha's crown.

Statue of Guanzizai sits with on leg crossing and one leg dropping. The Yujingping full of sweet dew and a willow branch is placed near him, representing his mercy and sympathy to spread to all the people. A boy and a girl serve as his attendants on his two sides. The boy is Sudhana (善財童子; Shàncái Tóngzǐ) and the girl is Longnü (龍女).

=== Thousand-armed and eyed Guanyin ===
Thousand-armed and eyed Guanyin, has thousands of arms on both sides of the body. For statues, there are often 42 hands with one eye in each to symbolize the thousand hands. The middle two hands are in closing palm posture and other hands are holding Vajras, sutra scrolls Dharma seals and other weapons. Guanyin's thousand hands mean to protect all living creatures and the eyes mean to view over the world.

=== Others ===
Yangnyu-Gwaneum (양류관음; 楊柳觀音) holds a willow branch in one hand and Sibilmyeon-Gwaneum (십일면관음) has 11 different forms on top of its crown.
