= Wuhu =

Wuhu 芜湖市
- Prefecture-level city
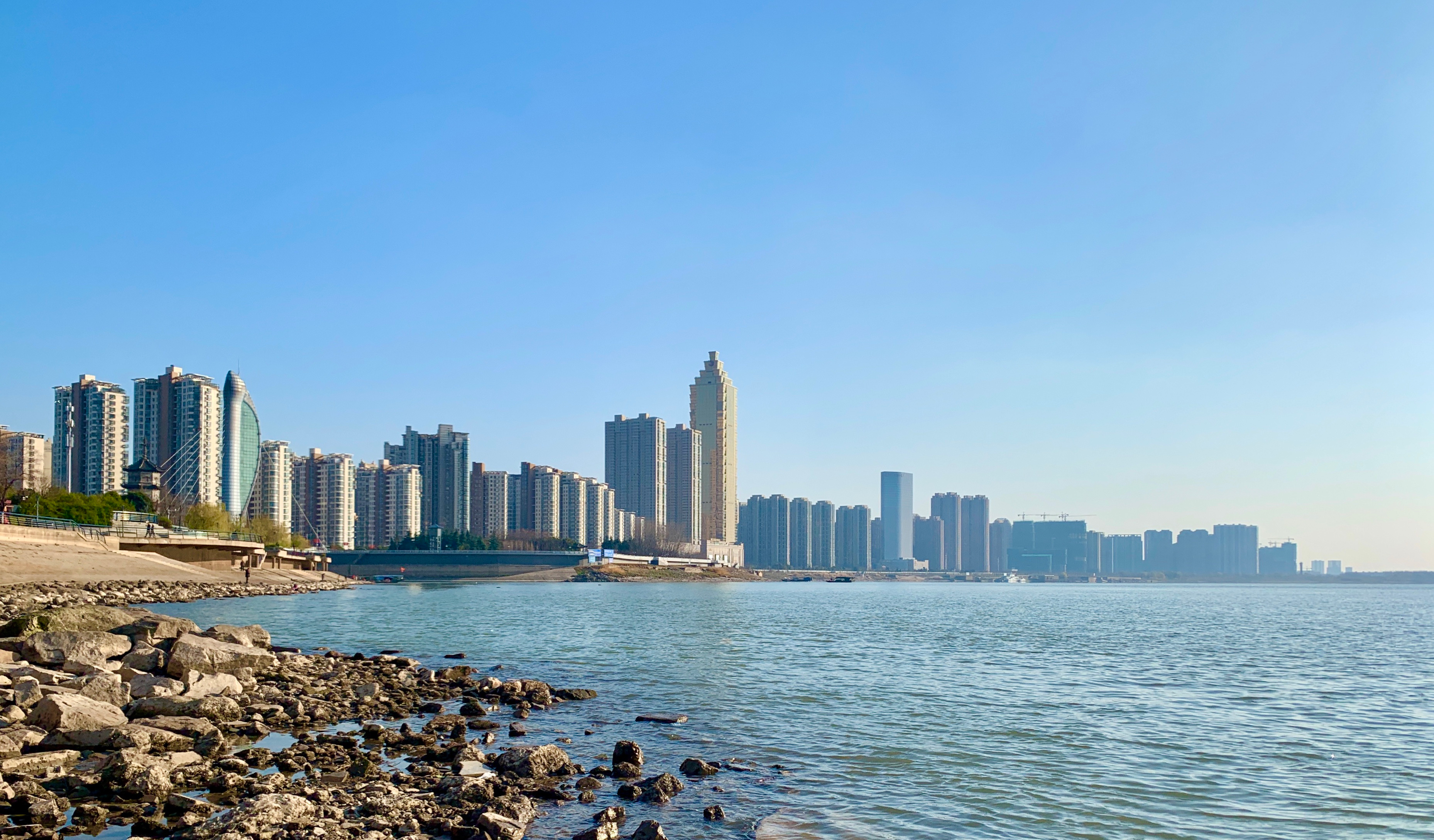
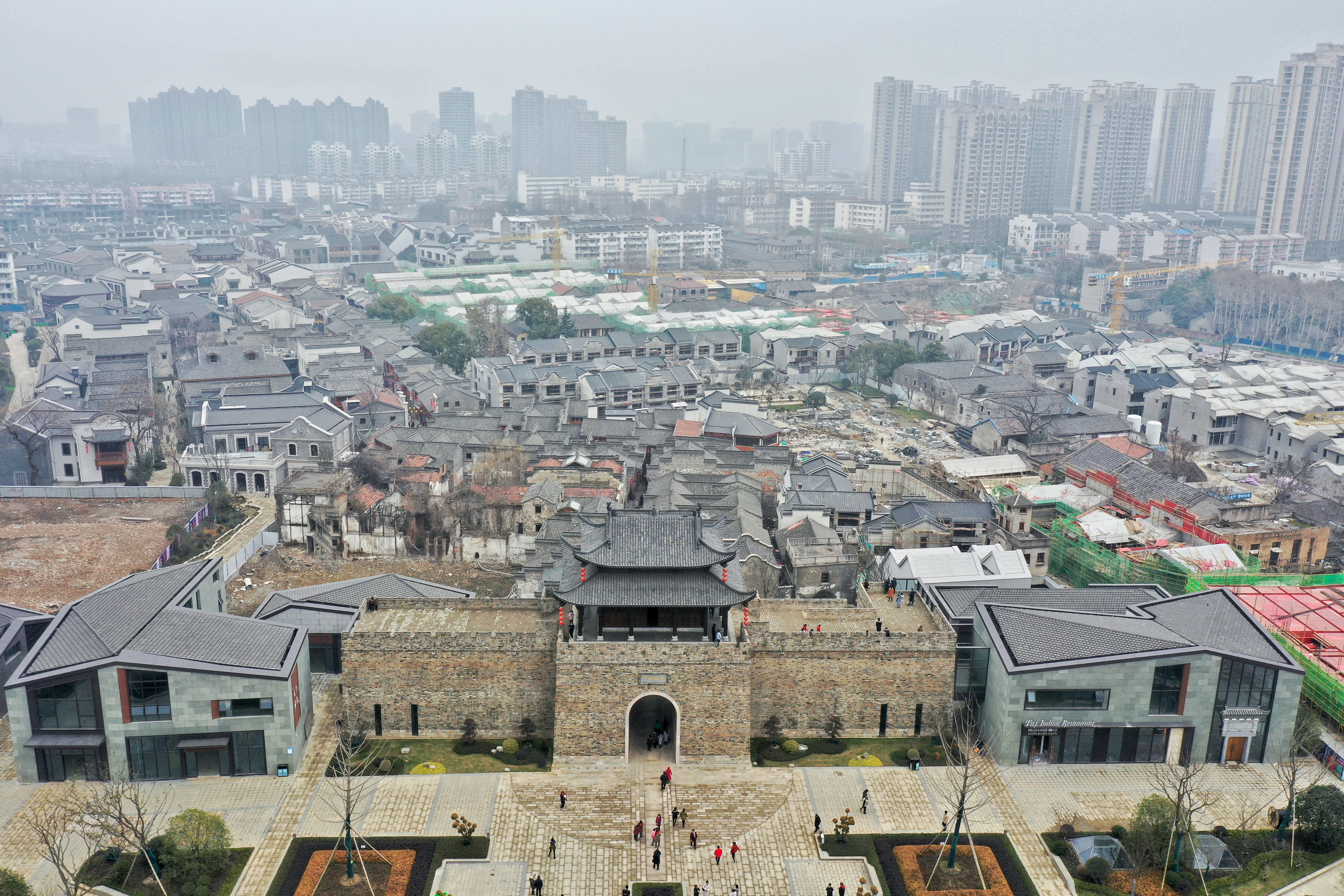
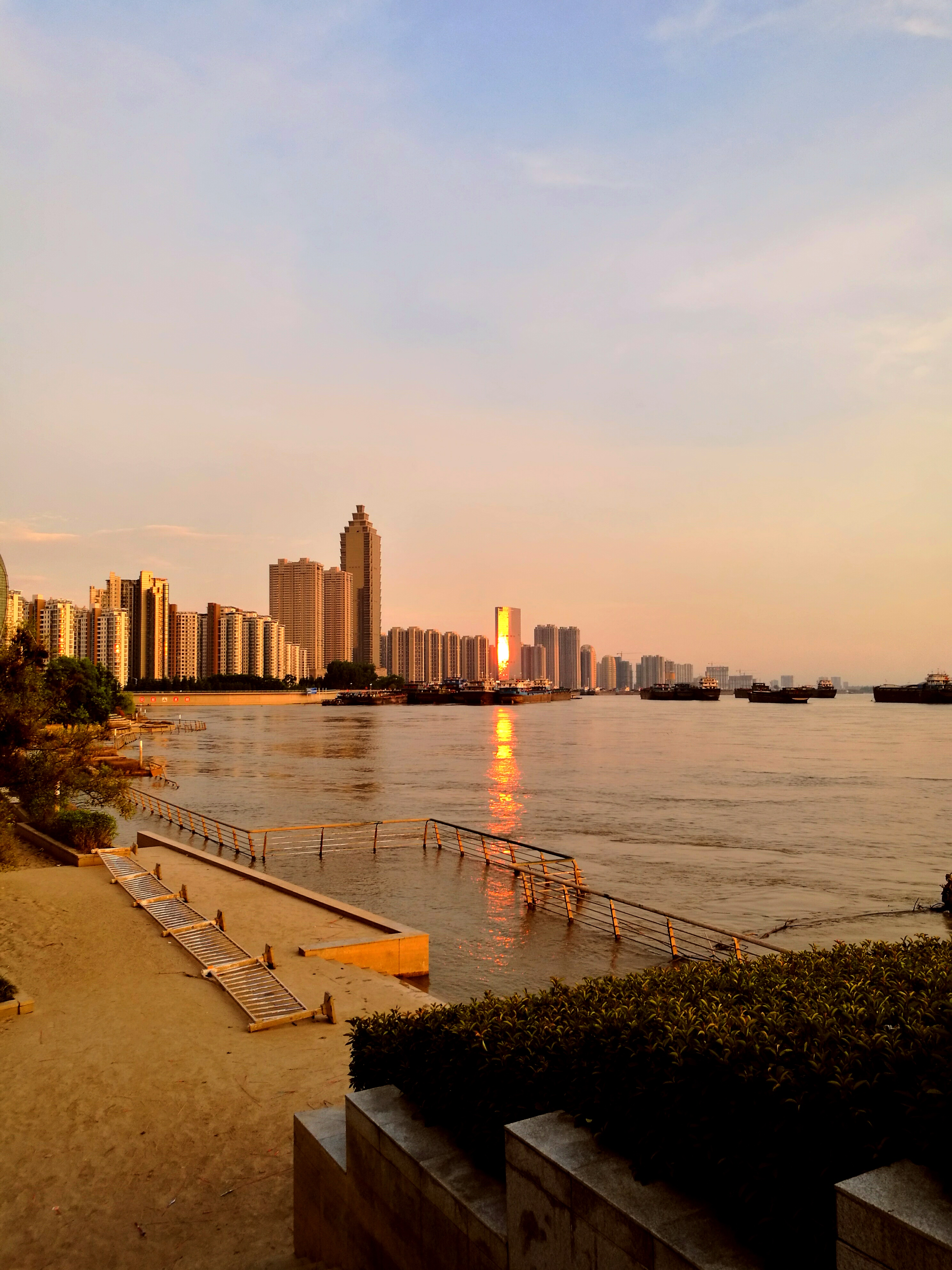
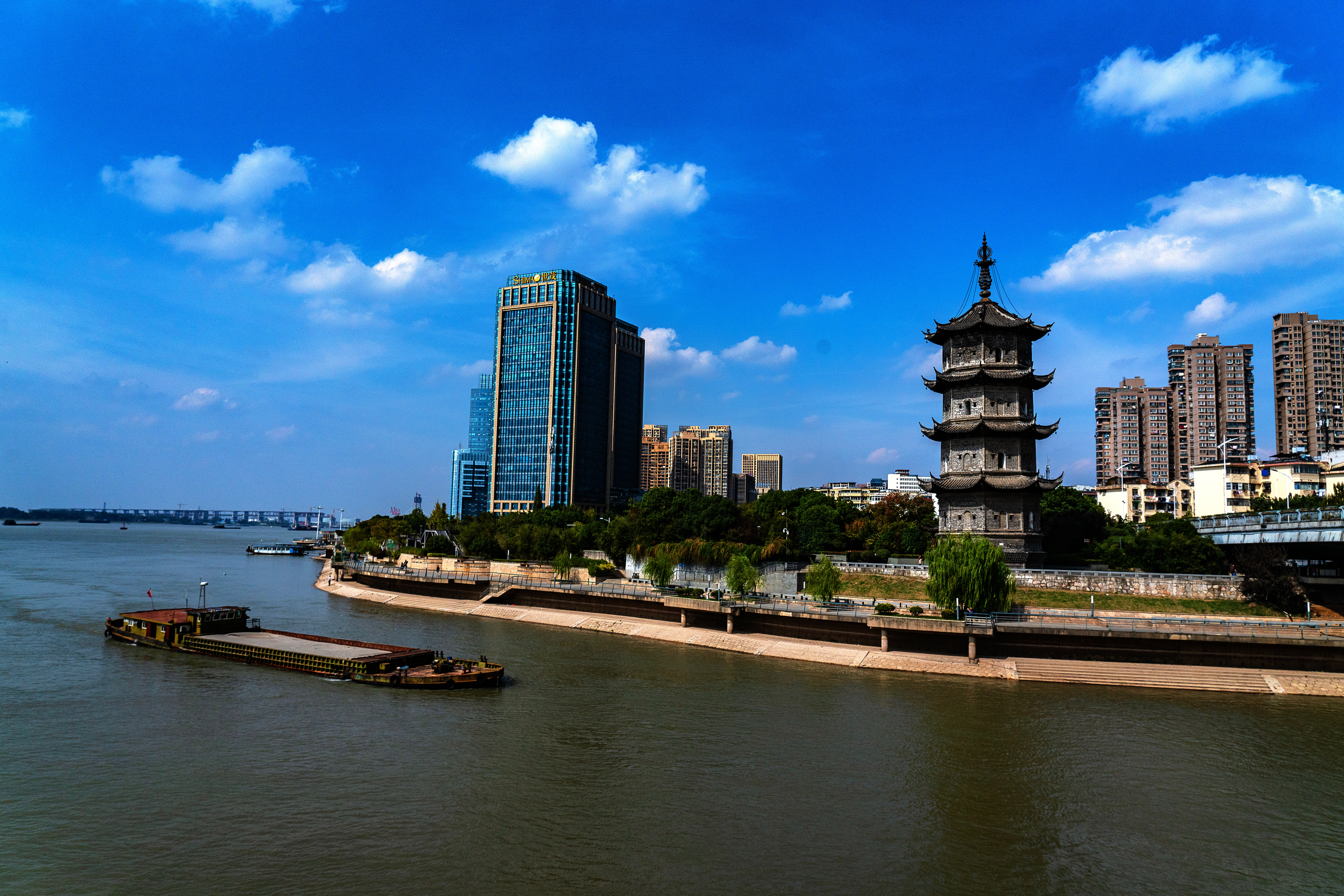
- Clockwise from top: Wuhu skyline looking south along the Yangtze, Wuhu at sunset, the Zhongjiang Tower, and Changhong Gate (south).

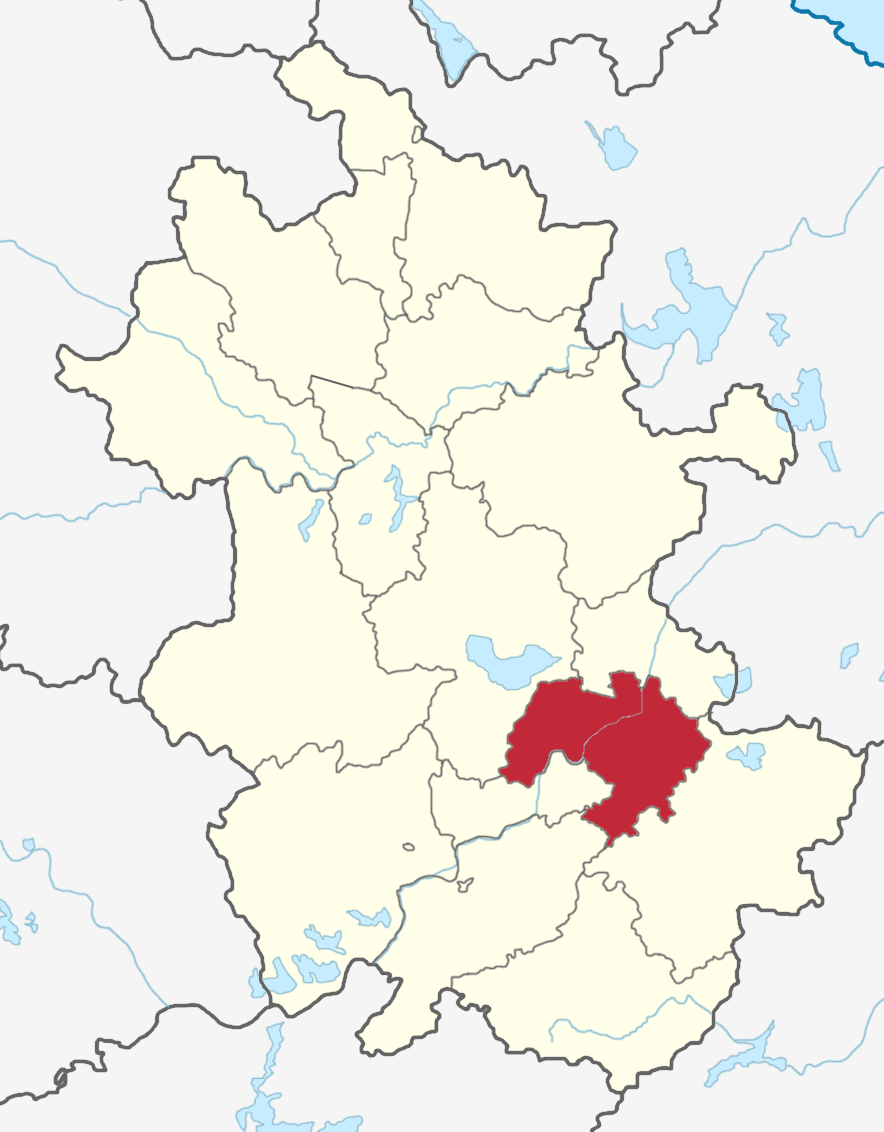
- Location of Wuhu in Anhui
- Coordinates (Wuhu municipal government): 31°21′09″N 118°25′59″E
- Country: China
- Province: Anhui
- County-level divisions: 8
- Municipal seat: Jiujiang District

Government
  - Party Secretary: Ning Bo (宁波)
  - Mayor: Xu Zhi (徐志)

Area
  - Prefecture-level city: 6,010.9 km^{2} (2,320.8 sq mi)
  - Urban: 2,157 km^{2} (833 sq mi)
  - Metro: 1,172.9 km^{2} (452.9 sq mi)
- Elevation: 7.9 m (26 ft)

Population (2020 census)
  - Prefecture-level city: 3,644,420
  - Density: 606.30/km^{2} (1,570.3/sq mi)
  - Urban: 2,151,368
  - Urban density: 997.4/km^{2} (2,583/sq mi)
  - Metro: 1,622,799
  - Metro density: 1,383.6/km^{2} (3,583.5/sq mi)

GDP
  - Prefecture-level city: CN¥ 430.3 billion US$ 53.8 billion
  - Per capita: CN¥117,174; US$18,163
- Time zone: UTC+8 (CST)
- Postal code: 241000
- Area code: 0553
- ISO 3166 code: CN-AH-02
- License Plate Prefix: 皖B
- Website: www.wuhu.gov.cn

Wuhu (simplified Chinese: 芜湖; traditional Chinese: 蕪湖; pinyin: Wúhú; lit. 'Weedy Lake') is a prefecture-level city in southeastern Anhui province, China. Sitting on the southeast bank of the Yangtze River, Wuhu borders Xuancheng to the southeast, Chizhou and Tongling to the southwest, Hefei City to the northwest, Ma'anshan city to the northeast, Jiangsu to the east, and is approximately 90 km (56 mi) southwest of Nanjing. With ongoing urbanization in the southern part of Nanjing, a conurbation is forming between Nanjing, Maanshan and Wuhu, comprising over 10.66 million inhabitants.

== History ==
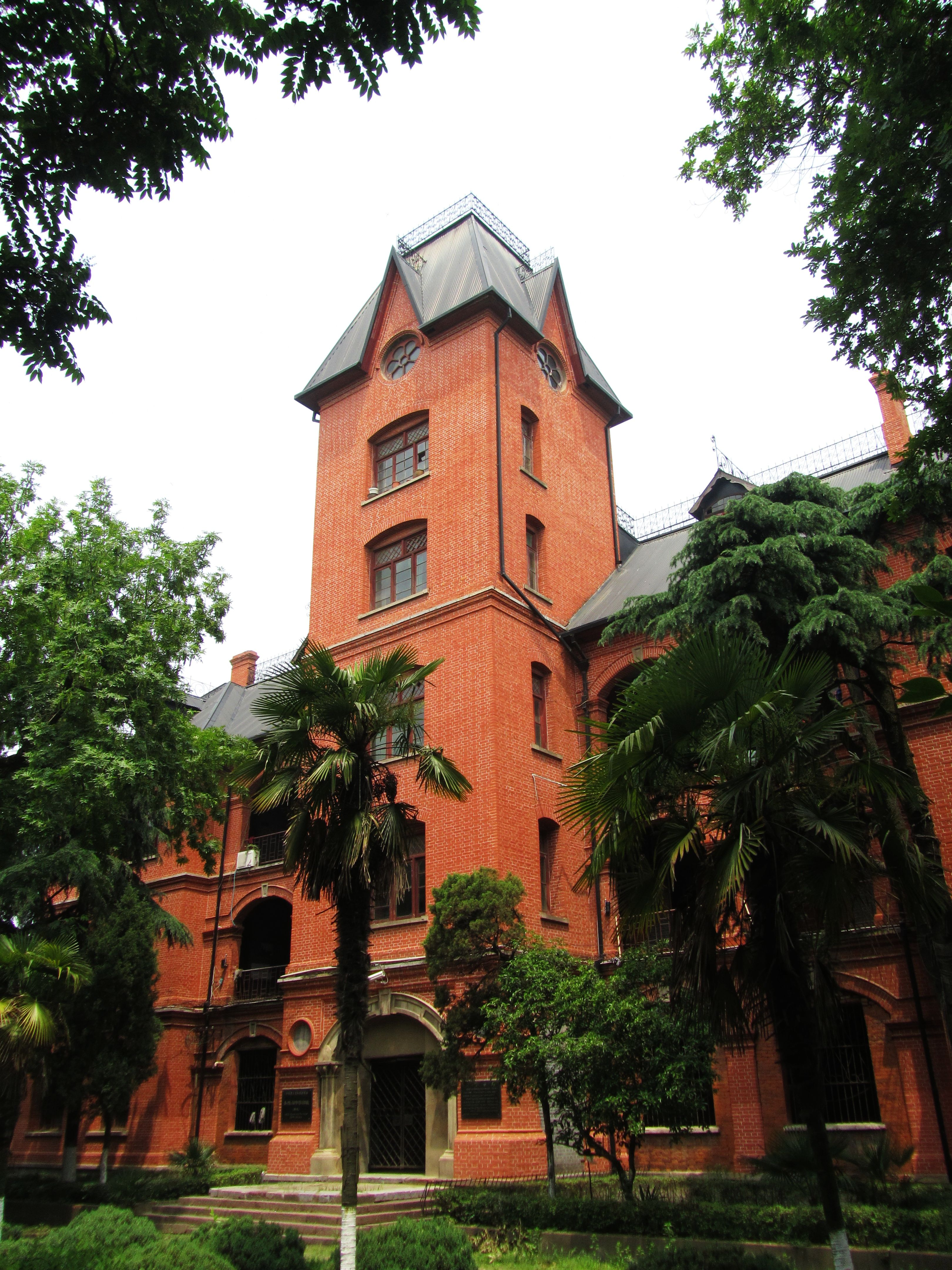
A heritage building: the St. James' School (No. 11 Middle School), Lion Hill, Wuhu

Wuhu is known to have been inhabited since at least 570 BCE. Present-day Wuhu evolved out of a settlement known as Jiuzi (Chinese: 鸠兹; pinyin: Jiūzī), located on the southern bank of the Shuiyang River, about 20 kilometres (12 mi) southeast of Wuhu's contemporary urban core. Jiuzi was a site of conflict prior to 670 BCE between the Chu and the Wu during the Spring and Autumn period. In 473 BCE, the Yue took Jiuzi from the Wu. In 306 BCE, the Chu took Jiuzi from the Yue.

During the time of the Qin dynasty, Jiuzi was placed under the jurisdiction of the Zhang Commandery (Chinese: 鄣郡; pinyin: Zhāng Jùn). In 109 BCE, Zhang Commandery was renamed to Danyang Commandery. During this time, the area of Juizi was reorganized as Wuhu County (simplified Chinese: 芜湖县; traditional Chinese: 蕪湖縣; pinyin: Wúhú Xiàn). In 223 CE, under the reign of Sun Quan of the Eastern Wu, the county seat was moved from the site of Jiuzi to the highlands along the north banks of the Qingyi River, to the southeast of contemporary Wuhu's urban core.

Xuancheng Commandery was carved-out of Danyang Commandery in 281 CE, with the headquarters of Danyang Commandery moved to Nanjing. The area of contemporary Wuhu remained under the jurisdiction of Danyang Commandery. During the Eastern Jin period, the area saw an influx of people migrate to the area from the Central Plains. The area was placed under the jurisdiction of Xuancheng Commandery in 363 CE, and the commandery's headquarters were moved to the area. During the late 4th Century, the area underwent a number of other administrative changes. Part of the area would fall under the jurisdiction of Huainan Commandery.

Both Xuancheng Commandery and Huainan Commandery were abolished early on during the Sui dynasty, in 589 CE.

In 627 CE, under the Tang dynasty, the area was re-organized as Xuan Prefecture (Chinese: 宣州; pinyin: Xuān Zhōu), and placed under the jurisdiction of Jiangnan Circuit. In 733 CE, it became part of the newly created Jiangnanxi Circuit. In 758 CE, it was transferred to be part of Sheng Prefecture, in Jiangnandong Circuit. Three years later, it would return to Xuan Prefecture in Jiangnanxi Circuit. In 787 CE, Xuan Prefecture was transferred to Jiangnandong Circuit.

In 937 CE, upon the creation of the Southern Tang during the Five Dynasties and Ten Kingdoms period, Wuhu County was established, and placed under Jiangning Fu. Since then, Wuhu went uninterrupted as an administrative unit throughout the remainder of dynastic China.

During the Song dynasty, Wuhu County belonged to Jiangnan Circuit, and later Jiangnandong Circuit.

In 1277, during the Yuan dynasty, Wuhu County was placed under the jurisdiction of Taiping Circuit. In 1355, Taiping Circuit was replaced by Taiping Fu, and Wuhu County was placed under its jurisdiction.

Taiping Fu was under the jurisdiction of Zhongshu Sheng until its abolition in 1380, during the Ming dynasty. Throughout the Ming dynasty, Wuhu County remained under the jurisdiction of Taiping Fu. Under the Ming dynasty, Wuhu developed into a major commercial center and river port and since that time has been known as a center of the rice trade.

In 1644, the Hongguang Emperor (better known as the Prince of Fu), one of the last emperors of the Ming dynasty, was captured by forces of the new Qing dynasty in Wuhu County. During the Taiping Rebellion, Wuhu County exchanged hands more than five times between Taiping and Imperial forces. Wuhu County was placed under the jurisdiction of Huiningchitaiguang Circuit during the Taiping Rebellion. The city became a treaty port in 1876 and has remained a commercial center since that time. The city's Roman Catholic cathedral, St. Joseph's Cathedral (圣若瑟主教座堂), dates from this time. Most of the downtown area alongside the Yangtze River was ceded in the British concession. Wuhu has been one of China's four major rice market cities since the Ming Dynasty, playing a crucial role in the domestic grain trade.

Upon the establishment of the Republic of China in 1912, Fu, Prefectures, and Ting were established, and counties were placed under direct provincial jurisdiction. Wuhu County was directly governed by Anhui province from 1912 until 1914, when Wuhu Circuit was established to govern 23 counties in the area, including Wuhu County, until 1928. Trade in rice, wood, and tea flourished at Wuhu until the Warlord Era of the 1920s and 1930s, when bandits were active in the area. In 1932, Wuhu County was placed under the jurisdiction of the Second Administrative Division of Anhui province (Chinese: 安徽省第二专区; pinyin: Ānhuī Shěng Dì Èr Zhuānqū).

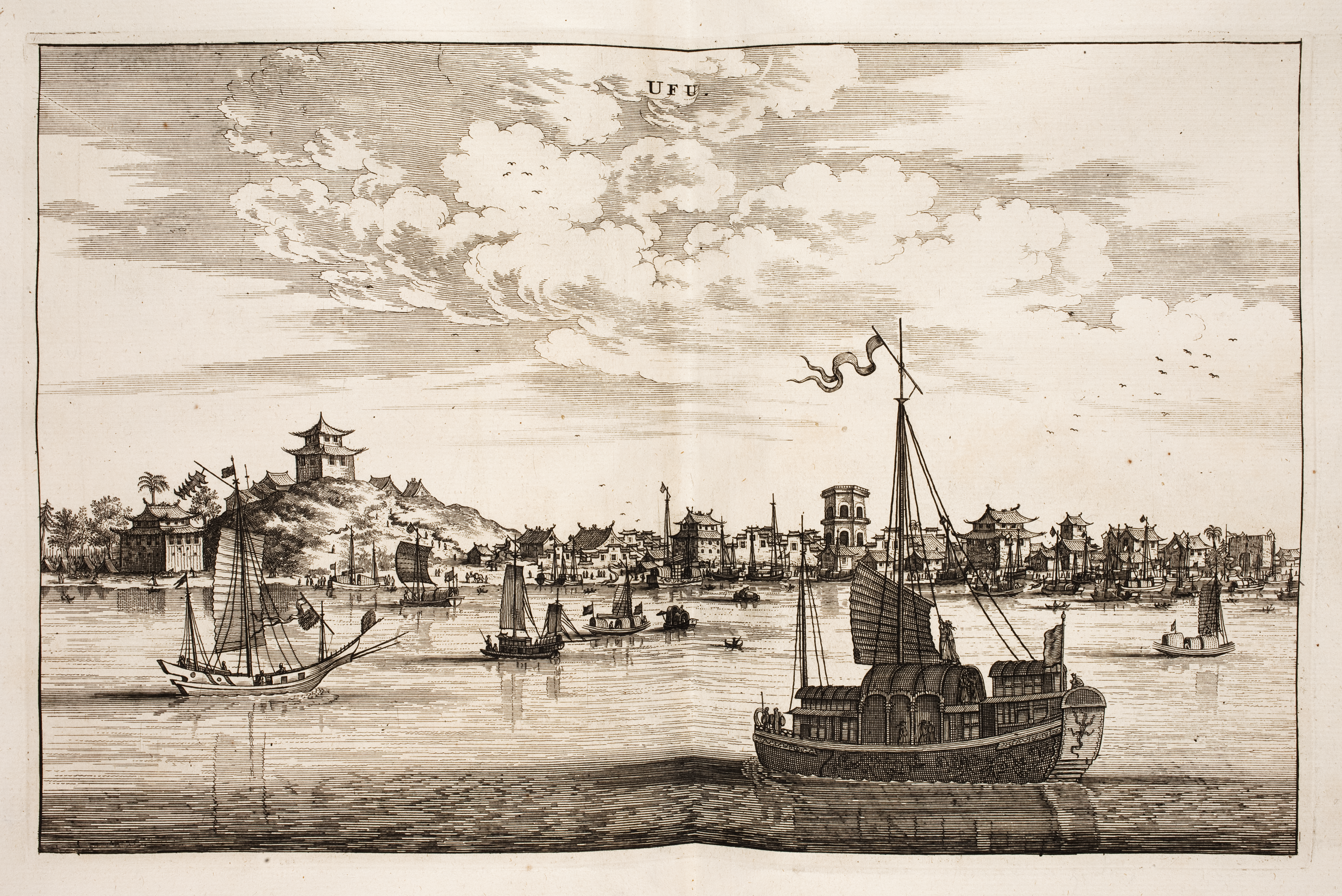
"Ufu". Nieuhof: L'ambassade de la Compagnie Orientale des Provinces Unies vers l'Empereur de la Chine, 1665

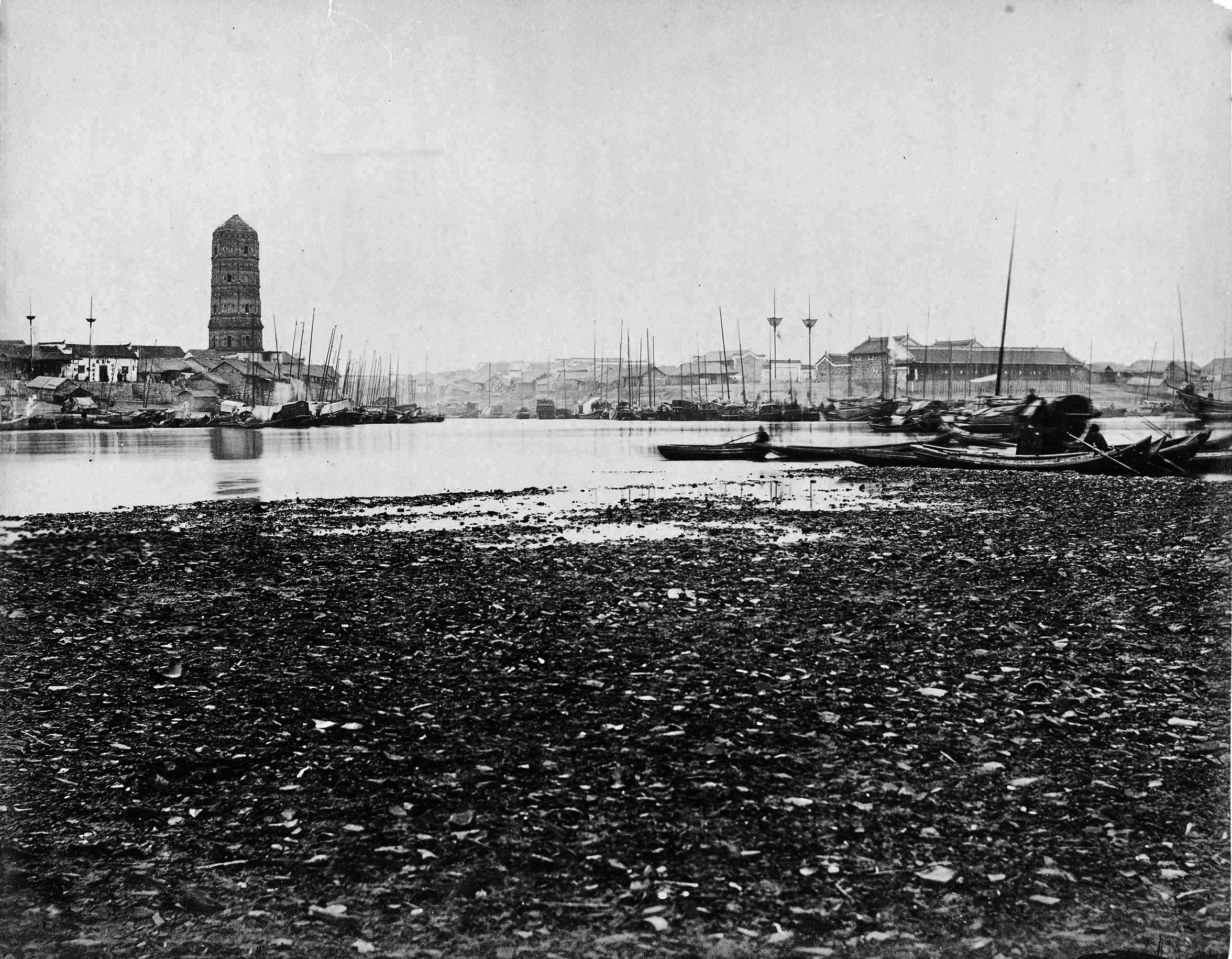
Zhongjiang Pagoda in the late 19th century.

At the beginning of the Second Sino-Japanese War, part of the Second World War, Wuhu was occupied by Japan on December 10, 1937. This was a prelude to the Battle of Nanjing, ending in the Nanjing massacre. Under Japanese occupation, Chinese resistance fighters hid in the lakes around Wuhu by submerging themselves and breathing through reeds. In early 1938, Japan moved Wuhu County from the Second Administrative Division to the Fifth Administrative Division. On October 25, 1938, they transferred Wuhu County to the Ninth Administrative Division. Japan had again changed the region's divisions in August 1941, and placed Wuhu County under the Sixth Administrative Division.

Japanese forces had been expelled from the area by August 1945, and Kuomintang forces placed Wuhu County under the Southern Anhui Administrative Office, and remained part of the Sixth Administrative Division.

The People's Liberation Army captured Wuhu on April 24, 1949. Three days later, it was placed under the jurisdiction of a local military committee. The civilian Wuhu Municipal People's Government was established on May 10, 1949. Two days later, a civilian government was formed for Wuhu County, which was placed under the jurisdiction of Wuhu.

From December 1, 1967, to April 1, 1968, during the tumult of the Cultural Revolution, Wuhu was placed under military rule.

Major industries began to be developed in Wuhu after the Second World War, with the development of the textile industry, shipbuilding, and paper mills. Despite this, Wuhu had been lagging behind Ma'anshan and Tongling in industrial production for decades after the establishment of the People's Republic of China and remained primarily a commercial center for trade in rice, silk, cotton, tea, wheat and eggs. However, with recent years' economic rise, Wuhu has become a hub for manufacturing.

In July 2016, the area was afflicted by the 2016 China floods.

On July 6, 2020, the Anhui provincial government approved the merger of Sanshan District into Yijiang District, the replacement of Wuhu County with Wanzhi District, and the replacement of Fanchang County with Fanchang District.

In June 2023, the area was afflicted by flooding.

== Administration ==
The prefecture-level city of Wuhu administers 8 county-level divisions, including 5 districts, 1 county, and 1 county-level city.

Name	Simplified Chinese	Pinyin	Population	Postal Code
Jinghu District	镜湖区	Jìnghú Qū	478,658	241000
Yijiang District	弋江区	Yìjiāng Qū	422,620	241002
Jiujiang District	鸠江区	Jiūjiāng Qū	721,521	241000
Wanzhi District	湾沚区	Wānzhǐ Qū	344,016	241100
Fanchang District	繁昌区	Fánchāng Qū	243,907	241200
Nanling County	南陵县	Nánlíng Xiàn	431,148	241300
Wuwei city	无为市	Wúwéi Shì	817,997	238300

Map
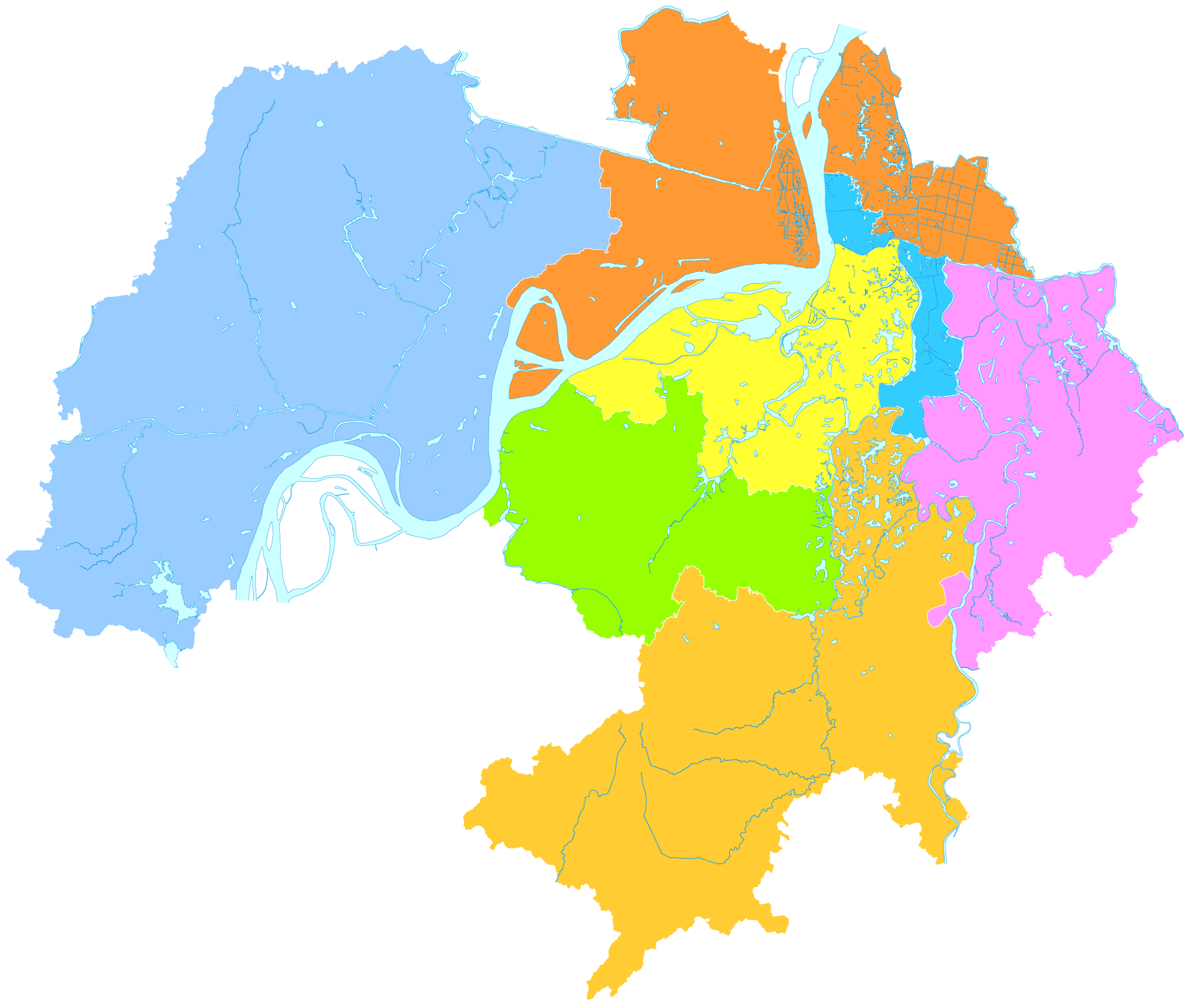

- Defunct – Sanshan District

== Climate ==
Climate data for Wuhu, elevation 10 m (33 ft), (1991–2020 normals, extremes 1981–present)
Month	Jan	Feb	Mar	Apr	May	Jun	Jul	Aug	Sep	Oct	Nov	Dec	Year
Record high °C (°F)	21.1 (70.0)	29.4 (84.9)	34.3 (93.7)	34.4 (93.9)	35.9 (96.6)	38.2 (100.8)	40.1 (104.2)	41.0 (105.8)	38.6 (101.5)	33.2 (91.8)	29.2 (84.6)	22.6 (72.7)	41.0 (105.8)
Mean daily maximum °C (°F)	7.7 (45.9)	10.5 (50.9)	15.5 (59.9)	21.9 (71.4)	27.1 (80.8)	29.6 (85.3)	33.1 (91.6)	32.6 (90.7)	28.4 (83.1)	23.1 (73.6)	16.9 (62.4)	10.3 (50.5)	21.4 (70.5)
Daily mean °C (°F)	3.9 (39.0)	6.3 (43.3)	10.8 (51.4)	17.0 (62.6)	22.3 (72.1)	25.6 (78.1)	29.2 (84.6)	28.6 (83.5)	24.2 (75.6)	18.6 (65.5)	12.3 (54.1)	6.1 (43.0)	17.1 (62.7)
Mean daily minimum °C (°F)	1.0 (33.8)	3.1 (37.6)	7.2 (45.0)	12.8 (55.0)	18.2 (64.8)	22.3 (72.1)	26.0 (78.8)	25.5 (77.9)	21.1 (70.0)	15.1 (59.2)	8.8 (47.8)	3.0 (37.4)	13.7 (56.6)
Record low °C (°F)	−7.8 (18.0)	−8.1 (17.4)	−3.2 (26.2)	2.7 (36.9)	9.6 (49.3)	13.4 (56.1)	19.4 (66.9)	17.4 (63.3)	13.1 (55.6)	3.8 (38.8)	−3.1 (26.4)	−8.5 (16.7)	−8.5 (16.7)
Average precipitation mm (inches)	65.6 (2.58)	70.6 (2.78)	101.9 (4.01)	100.4 (3.95)	113.7 (4.48)	209.6 (8.25)	185.3 (7.30)	144.1 (5.67)	80.1 (3.15)	56.1 (2.21)	59.4 (2.34)	43.2 (1.70)	1,230 (48.42)
Average precipitation days (≥ 0.1 mm)	10.8	10.5	12.4	11.2	11.5	12.3	11.6	11.5	8.3	8.1	9.0	7.9	125.1
Average snowy days	3.9	2.1	0.7	0.1	0	0	0	0	0	0	0.4	1.0	8.2
Average relative humidity (%)	77	75	74	72	72	78	78	79	78	76	77	75	76
Mean monthly sunshine hours	106.0	110.8	138.1	165.2	177.8	149.5	198.7	191.5	151.8	156.6	135.6	124.9	1,806.5
Percentage possible sunshine	33	35	37	42	42	35	46	47	41	45	43	40	41
Source: China Meteorological Administration

== Demographics ==
Historical population
Year	Pop.	±%
1953	242,143	—
1964	333,465	+37.7%
1982	456,219	+36.8%
1990	441,999	−3.1%
2000	641,259	+45.1%
2010	1,108,087	+72.8%
2020	1,598,165	+44.2%
Source: Census in China

=== Population ===
As of the 2020 Chinese census, Wuhu had a total population of 3,644,420 inhabitants, of whom 1,622,799 lived its built-up (or metro) area: Jiujiang District, Jinghu District and Yijiang District. As of 2022, 13.75% of Wuhu's population is 14 years old or younger, 65.60% is 15 to 59 years old, and 20.65% is 60 years old or older. 16.89% of Wuhu's population is 65 years or older.

The city is home to 47 recognized ethnic minorities, the largest of which are the Hui, Miao, and Zhuang. Other ethnic minorities with over 500 inhabitants in the city include the Yi, the Tujia, the Miao, the Zhuang, and the Manchu.

=== Language ===
Wuhu dialect, a variety of Jiang-Huai Mandarin, itself a branch of Mandarin Chinese, is commonly spoken in urban areas. Putonghua, or Standard Mandarin, was commonly used in this area. In some areas, Wu Chinese is spoken instead.

== Economy ==
The city is the second largest economy in Anhui, after Hefei, the provincial capital. Like elsewhere in China, Wuhu was seen rapid economic growth in the 21st Century, with its GDP nearly doubling from 2014 to 2022 alone, and its GDP per capita nearly doubling from 2012 to 2019 alone.

As of 2022, Wuhu has a gross domestic product (GDP) of 450.213 billion renminbi (RMB). Per 2022 data, the city's primary sector of the economy accounts for 17.925 billion RMB of the city's GDP (3.98% of total GDP), the secondary sector accounts for 213.558 billion RMB (47.43%), and the tertiary sector accounts for 218.730 billion RMB (48.58%).

As of 2019, Wuhu's GDP per capita was 96,154 RMB. The city's statistics bureau reported an annual per capita disposable income of 43,145 RMB in 2022 (+6.5% from 2021). The city's urban residents have a per capita disposable income of 51,481, while this stands at 29,518 among rural residents.

In 2022, Wuhu exported 9.468 billion United States dollars (USD) worth of goods and services, and imported 4.142 billion USD worth of goods and services.

Major industrial products in Wuhu include automobiles, HVAC units, plate glass, cement, steel, and copper.

Wuhu Economic & Technological Development Area in the north of the city launched in 1993 is one of the first state-level economic and technological development area in Anhui province. It has the only export processing zone in the province. Chery Automobile and Anhui Conch Cement Company are headquartered in this development area.

Wuhu is the fifth largest port alongside Yangtze River. Yuxikou Pier is the largest inland river coal harbor in China.

== Transportation ==
=== Bus and taxi ===
The city is served by Wuhu Bus (Chinese: 芜湖公交; pinyin: Wúhú Gōngjiāo), a municipal bus services and taxi services provider. Wuhu Bus runs 157 different routes, serviced by more than 1,300 vehicles. About 200,000 passengers use the service daily.

=== Airport ===
The city is served by the Wuhu Xuanzhou Airport which opened on April 30, 2021.

=== Bridge ===
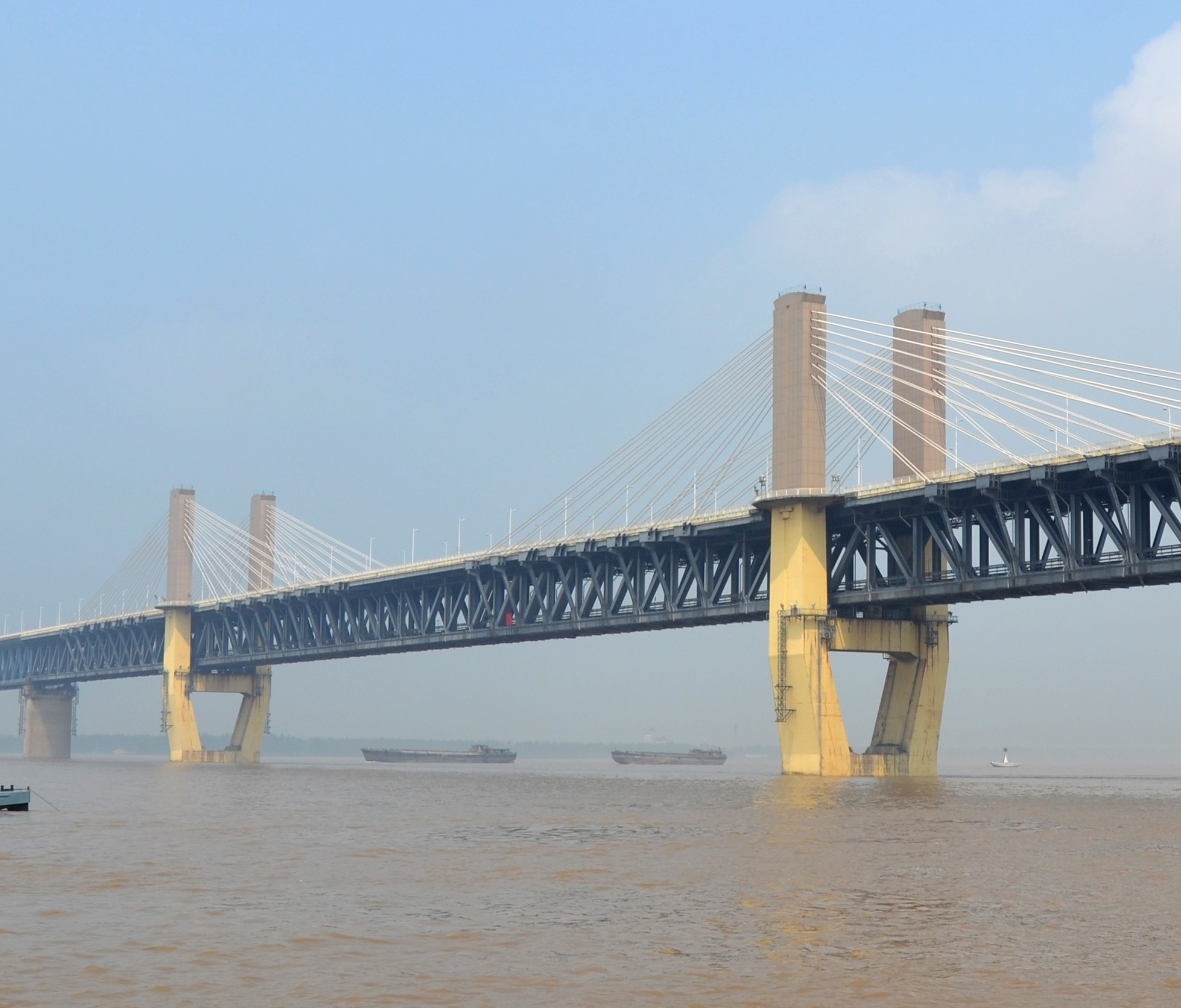
the Wuhu Yangtze River Bridge

Wuhu has one Yangtze River crossing—the Wuhu Yangtze River Bridge, opened in 2000, carries the G5011 Wuhu–Hefei Expressway and Huainan Railway.

=== Train ===
Wuhu is served by the Anhui–Jiangxi, Nanjing–Tongling and Huainan Railways. It only takes 2.5 hours from Shanghai to Wuhu by high-speed train.

=== Monorail system ===
Wuhu Rail Transit consists of two lines (Lines 1 and 2) which opened on November 3 and December 28, 2021.

== Culture ==
The acclaimed poet Li Bai spent his late life in Wuhu, it is said, due to its striking landscape. Li Bai was born in Suyab, an ancient Silk Road city in Central Asian, and raised in southwestern China. Xie Tiao, one of the most distinctive Six Dynasty poets whom he greatly admired, left many poems when holding positions here.

During the Tang dynasty (619–907), the poet Du Mu wrote a famous poem Thoughts on Staying Again at Wuhu.

A factory in Wuhu carries on the local craft of making wrought iron pictures. Other local handicrafts are embossed lacquerware and rice straw pith patchwork. A famous stone tablet in Wuhu recording local events of the Song dynasty period (ca. 1000 AD) is considered to be a masterpiece of the renowned calligrapher Mi Fu.

=== Folklore ===
An itinerant blacksmith named Tang Tianchi is reputed to have invented the wrought-iron picture in Wuhu, when a painter whom he admired chided him, "You will never make pictures by beating iron."

Another blacksmith of the Spring and Autumn period (770–476 BC) named Gan Jiang was famous for sword making. Zhe Shan (Reddish Brown Hill) is said to get its colour from the flames of Gan Jiang's furnace. Shen Shan (Sacred Hill) is the legendary location of his sword grinding rock and tempering pool.

=== Cuisine ===
Wuhu and Anking are noted centers of the Yanjiang cuisine. It specializes in freshwater fish and poultry, and features special techniques of chopping, shaping, and colouring. The flavour of Yanjiang dishes is often enhanced by sweetening and smoking.

=== Religion/medicine ===
The New York Methodist Mission Society's Superintendent Virgil C. Hart arrived in Wuhu in 1881, intent on purchasing a piece of property to build the city's first Methodist Church and Western-style hospital. Hart was able to secure the Yichisan Hill before the British, who wanted the property to build a consulate and naval base. The Yichisan Hospital is Anhui's oldest/continuous western hospital. Dr. Edgerton H. Hart (V.C. Hart's eldest son) became the hospital's Director in 1895 and continued at that capacity until his death in April 1913. Caroline Maddock arrived in Wuhu in October 1904, to serve as the General Hospital's Head Nurse. Caroline Maddock married Dr. Edgerton Hart in October 1907. In 1909, Caroline and four other nurses founded the Nurses Association of China and she served as its first president; this association still represents China's nursing profession.

== Heritage and tourism ==
Several sites in Wuhu have been included on the China's List of Major National Historical and Cultural Sites. They include the Barren Hill Temple (Guangji Temple 广济寺), a Buddhist temple originally dating back to the Tang dynasty that contains The Barren Hill Pagoda (Zhe Pagoda), an edifice from the Northern Song dynasty.

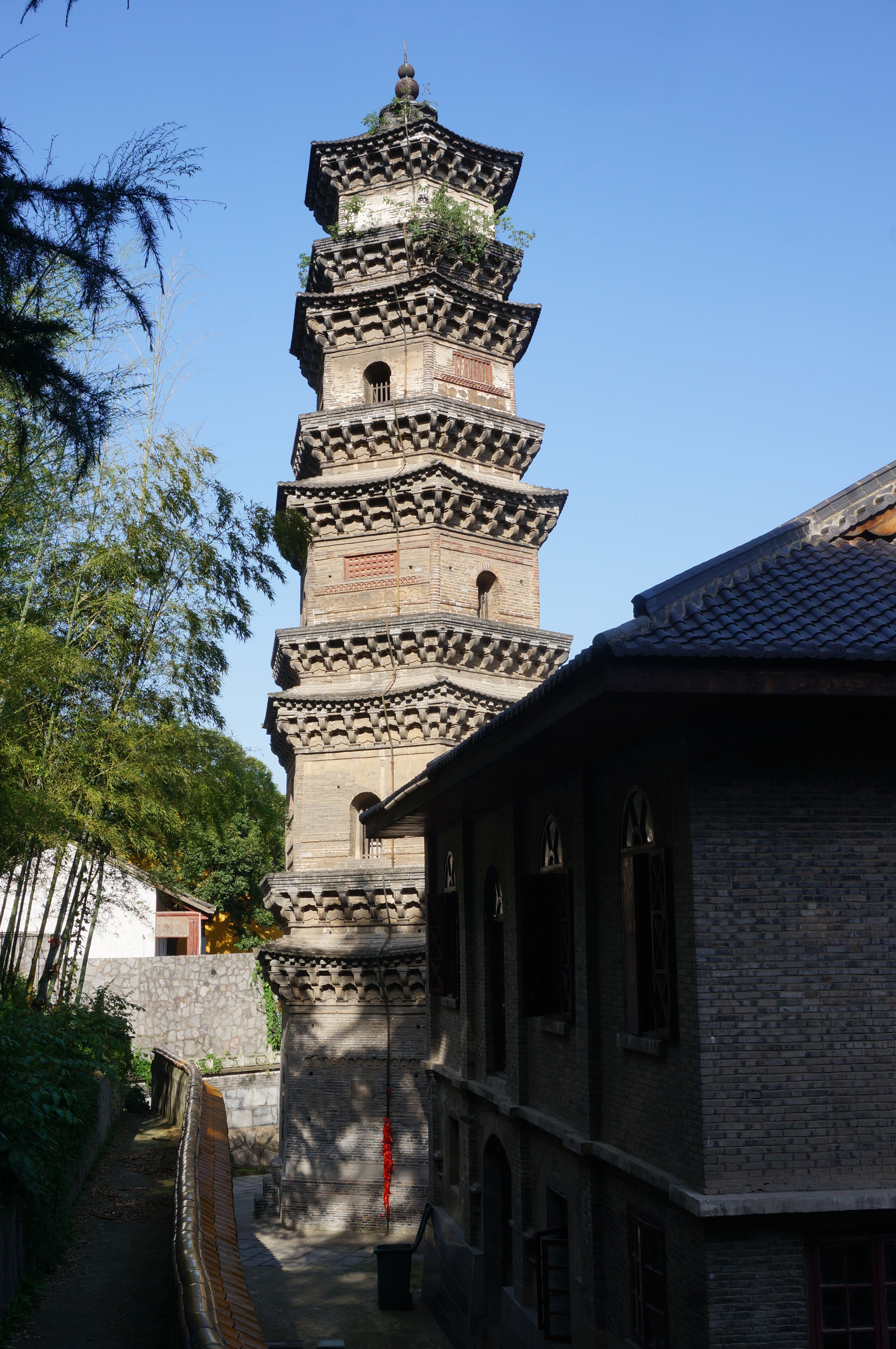
The Barren Hill Pagoda in Barren Hill Temple (Guangji Temple), dating to the Northern Song dynasty

Other listed monuments date back to the 19th and 20th century, when Wuhu was a former treaty port. These include the St. Joseph Cathedral and St. Aloysius Technical School, the British Consulate Office (Fanluoshan) and Residence (Yugengshan), the Wuhu Bund including the Wuhu Customs House(Yangtze Riverside Park) (滨江公园), Advent Church and houses, the Methodist residence houses and Wuhu Girls' School in Qingshan, the Advent Church and Disciples of Christ's Wuhu Union Academy, the Asiatic Petroleum Company house (Tieshan Hotel), the Wuhu Foreign Cemetery (Zheshan-Tieshan) and other sites dating back to Wuhu's treaty port era.

Other touristic sites in Wuhu:

- Zhongshan Road (Damalu)
- Changjie
- Erjie
- Mirror Lake (镜湖) (Taotang)
- Jiuzi Plaza (鸠兹广场)
- Zheshan (Barren Hill) (Wuhu Park)
- Fantawild Adventure, one of the largest theme parks in mainland China (方特乐园-四座)
- Longwo Lake (龙窝湖)
- Maren Qifeng Scenic Area (马仁奇峰风景区)
- Macrolink Beluga Ocean Park (新华联大白鲸海洋公园)
- Wuhu Olympic Stadium (奥林匹克体育馆)
- Yangtze River Bridge Crossing (长江大桥)

== Education ==
Universities and Colleges

- Anhui Normal University
- Anhui Polytechnic University
- Wannan Medical College
- Wuhu Radio and TV University (芜湖广播电视大学)
- Wuhu Institute of Technology (芜湖职业技术学院)
- Anhui Business College of Vocational Technology (安徽商贸职业技术学院)
- Anhui Technical College of Mechanical and Electrical Engineering (安徽机电职业技术学院)
- Anhui college of Chinese traditional medicine (安徽中医药高等专科学校)
- Anhui vocational college of information technology (芜湖信息职业学院)

High Schools

- Wuhu City No. 1 High School (芜湖市第一中学)
- High School Affiliated to Anhui Normal University (安徽师范大学附属中学)
- Wuhu County No. 1 High School (芜湖县第一中学)
- Wuhu City No. 12 High School (芜湖市第十二中学)
- Fanchang County No. 1 High School (繁昌县第一中学)

== Health care system ==
Notable hospitals

- Yijishan Hospital (弋矶山医院, or Affiliated Hospital of Wannan Medical College (皖南医学院附属弋矶山医院)
- Xuancheng Area Hospital (宣城地区人民医院), or Second Affiliated Hospital of Wannan Medical College (皖南医学院第二附属医院)
- Wuhu Second Hospital (芜湖市第二人民医院)
- Wuhu First Hospital (芜湖市第一人民医院)
- Wuhu Third Hospital (芜湖市第三人民医院)
- Wuhu Fourth Hospital (芜湖市第四人民医院)
- Wuhu Fifth Hospital (芜湖市第五人民医院)
- Wuhu Hospital of Traditional Chinese Medicine (芜湖市中医院)
- Maternal and Child Health Hospital of Wuhu City (芜湖市妇幼保健院)
- Wuhu Red Cross Hospital (芜湖市红十字医院)

Related health care settings

- Wuhu CDC (芜湖市疾病预防控制中心)
- Wuhu Center of Blood (芜湖市中心血站)

== Notable people ==
- Helen Priscilla Stam (born in Wuhu General Hospital in September 1934)
- John and Betty Stam (reinterred in the Wuhu Foreign Cemetery In January 1935)
- Xiao Yuncong (1596–1673), Ming Dynasty painter
- Zhao Wei (born 1976), actress
- Zhou Lüxin (born 1988), diver
- Wang Ying, (1913–1974) actress and author
- Jackie Chan (born 1954), actor and martial artist (father from Wuhu)
- Chen Duxiu (Chinese: 陳獨秀; Wade–Giles: Ch'en Tu-hsiu; October 8, 1879 – May 27, 1942) was a Chinese revolutionary socialist, educator, philosopher and author, who co-founded the Chinese Communist Party (with Li Dazhao) in 1921, serving from 1921 to 1927 as its first General Secretary. (teacher of the Government Boys' School (Wanjiang school))

== Notable constructions ==
- 229 metres (751 ft) tall pylons of HVDC Yangtze River Crossing Wuhu, a part of HVDC Three Gorges-Changzhou, are the tallest pylons used for HVDC.

== Sister cities and friendly cities ==
- Kōchi, Kōchi Prefecture, Japan
- Pavia, Lombardy, Italy
- Torrejón de Ardoz, Madrid, Spain

== See also ==
- Chinese ship Wuhu
