= Baoding (disambiguation) =

Baoding is a prefecture-level city in Hebei, China.

Baoding may also refer to:

== Locations in China ==
- Baoding, Chongqing (宝顶), a town in Chongqing, China
- Baoding Subdistrict (保定街道), a subdistrict in Sanshan District, Wuhu, Anhui, China

== Historical eras ==
- Baoding (寶鼎, 266–269), era name used by Sun Hao, emperor of Eastern Wu
- Baoding (保定, 561–565), era name used by Emperor Wu of Northern Zhou

== See also ==
- Baoting Li and Miao Autonomous County, a county in Hainan whose name is also romanised as Paoting in postal romanization
- Baoding balls
