= Huainan railway station =

Railway station in Huainan, Anhui, China

Coordinates: 32.5448°N 117.0359°E

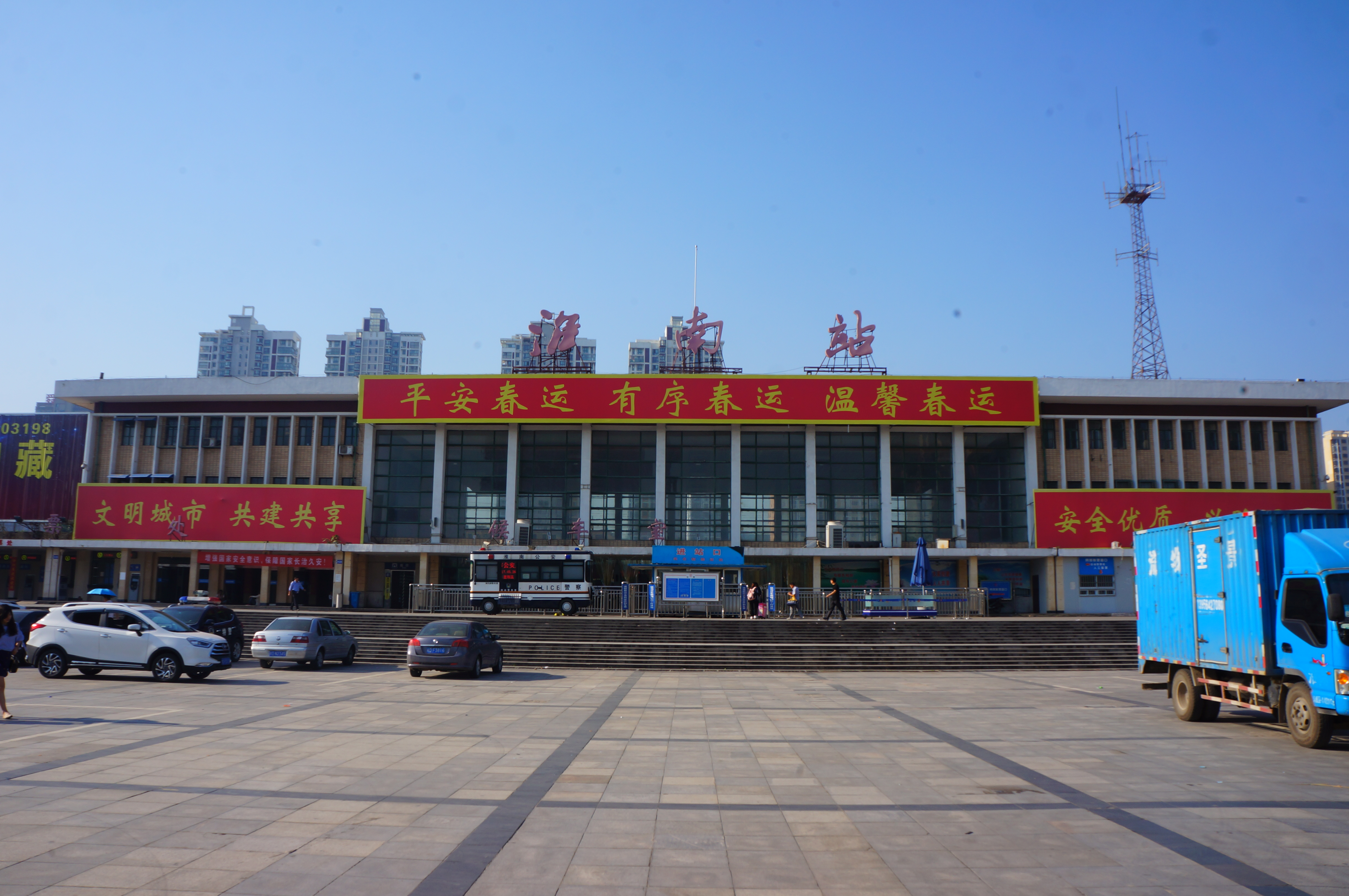

Huainan railway station is a second-class railway station on the Huainan railway and Fuyang–Huainan railway located in Tianjia'an District, Huainan, Anhui, China. The total area of the station is 3882 square meters. Huainan railway station was completed in November 1949 and put into operation in December.
