= Yijiang, Wuhu =

Yijiang 弋江区
- District
- Interactive map of Yijiang
- Coordinates: 31°18′40″N 118°22′23″E
- Country: China
- Province: Anhui
- Prefecture-level city: Wuhu
- District seat: Zhongnan Subdistrict

Area
  - Total: 232 km^{2} (90 sq mi)

Population (2020)
  - Total: 422,620
  - Density: 1,820/km^{2} (4,720/sq mi)
- Time zone: UTC+8 (China Standard)
- Postal code: 241002

Yijiang District (Chinese: 弋江区; pinyin: Yìjiāng Qū) is an urban district of the city of Wuhu, Anhui Province, China.

== Administrative divisions ==
Yijiang District is divided to 6 subdistricts.

6 Subdistricts

- Zhongnan Subdistrict (中南街道)
- Matang Subdistrict (马塘街道)
- Lugang Subdistrict (瀂港街道)
- Huolong Subdistrict (火龙街道)
- Baima Subdistrict (白马街道)
- Nanrui Subdistrict (南瑞街道)
