= Bagong Mountain Scenic Spot =

Mountain in Anhui, China

Bagong Mountain Scenic Spot (Chinese: 八公山风景区) is a national AAAA level scenic spot. It locates at Bagongshan District, Huainan, Anhui province. Mountain Bagong, known as a famous historic mountain, has many stories and legends like "ride/hang on someone's coattails"(Chinese: 一人得道鸡犬升天). Bagongshan Toufu created by Liu An is well known across the world and it plays an irreplaceable role in Chinese cuisine. Besides, Bagongshan is the originating place of creatures. Fossils of Huainan, commonly known as "Huainan worm" was formed 800 million years ago. It is by far the Earth's earliest ancient fossils ever found by the international geological community entitled it as the "Blue Planet" on the source of life.

== History ==
Bagongshan has a long history. During the ancient time, it was called Beishan (北山) or Zijinshan (紫金山). It was in primitive society, a tribe lived beside the Huai River. Then in Western Zhou dynasty, a kingdom was established named zhoulai (州来) whose capital city was at the foot of Bagongshan.

Besides, the name Bagongshan was originated from Lord Liu An's legend of becoming immortal. In Western Zhou dynasty, Bagongshan was a part of Huainan State. The governor of this state Liu An attached great importance to gather talents. Among all these talents, eight people was mostly appreciated. Thus they were called Bagong (八公). Liuan and his followers (Huainan Zi) studied about astronomical phenomena, formulated legislative plans and refined Chinese herbs. It was said that one day, Liu successfully made immortal medicine. Then, he became one of the immortals. However, during the process of making immortal medicine, Liu and his followers had mistakenly put gypsum into the soy milk, then tofu was accidentally made by this mistake.

== Major attractions ==
=== White Pagoda Temple ===
White Pagoda Temple has a long history. Dating back to the Northern Song dynasty, an eminent monk from the White Horse Temple in Luoyang (Henan province), came to Bagongshan and decided to build a temple there. Having considered the relationship between White Horse Temple and this temple, people thus named it White Pagoda Temple. Through the dynasties, the original temple has been destroyed. The existing temple is a re-built one. White Pagoda Temple follows the architectural style of Southern building style and covers an area of 6000 square meters.

=== Stone Landscape ===
Stone Landscape is an important geological landscape which is recognized as the precious treasure from the immortals. It is about 1.5-to-5-meter high and covers an area of 300 thousand square meters. According to geologists, the rocks there proves the long history of Bagongshan. About 700 million years ago, Bagongshan district was a shallow beach where was filled with chippings. Because of the diastrophism, Bagongshan distract was flooded. Then, under the pressure effect, the original chippings turned into rocks, which was the initial formulating stage of this landscape.

== Tourism Information ==
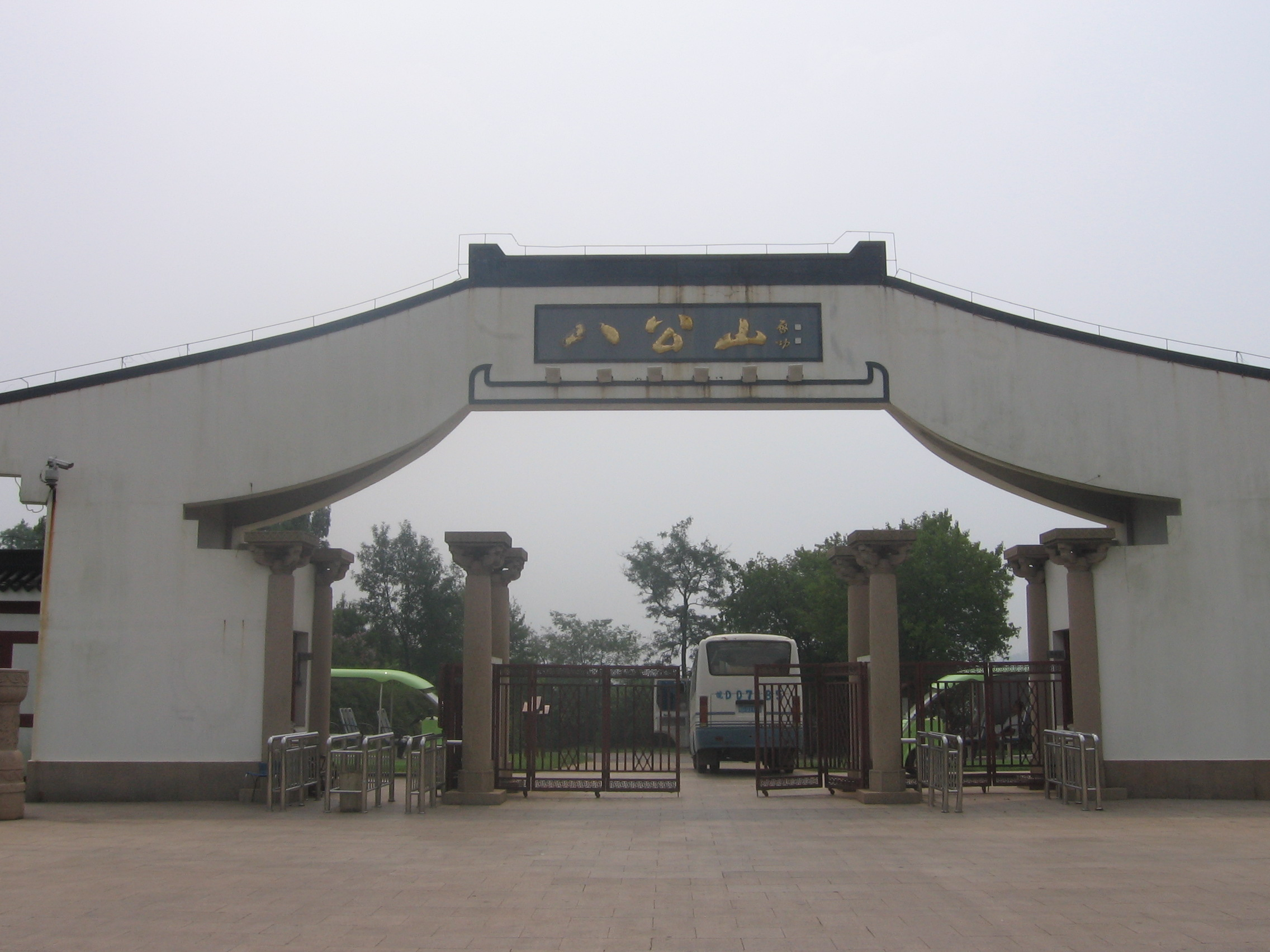
Main entrance of Bagong Mountain Scenic Spot

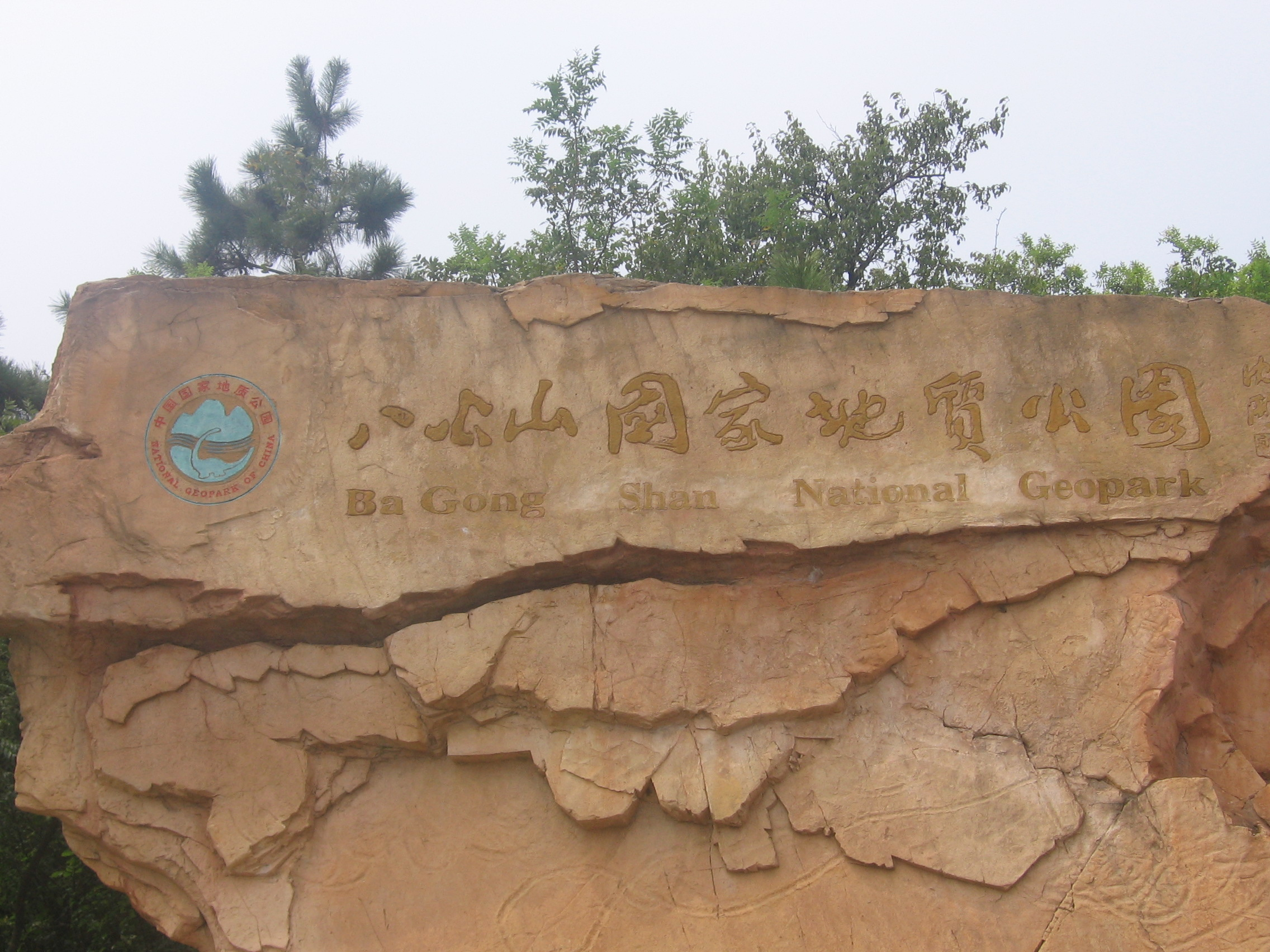
BaGong Shan National Geopark (Bagong Mountain National Geopark)

Address	Bagong Mountain scenic spot, Huainan, Anhui province
Postcode	232072
Telephone number	0554-5231196
Level	AAAA
Type	Forest Park
Ticket price	40RMB each person. Free for serviceman, the handicapped, old men aged above 70, and kids under 120 centimeters tall.
Open hour	8:00 --- 18:00
Parking information	Parking lot at the north gate
Price of commentator	40RMB per time.
Tourism activities	Lunar April eighth, Temple fair at the White Pagoda Temple 15 September, Tourism festival of Bagong Mountain
Specialty	Bagongshan Toufu Huainan beef soup
