= Bagongshan, Huainan =

Coordinates: 32.6329°N 116.84°E

Bagongshan 八公山区
- District
- Interactive map of Bagongshan
- Country: China
- Province: Anhui
- Prefecture-level city: Huainan
- District seat: Xinzhuangzi

Area
  - Total: 105 km^{2} (41 sq mi)

Population (2020)
  - Total: 118,221
  - Density: 1,130/km^{2} (2,920/sq mi)
- Time zone: UTC+8 (China Standard)
- Postal code: 232072

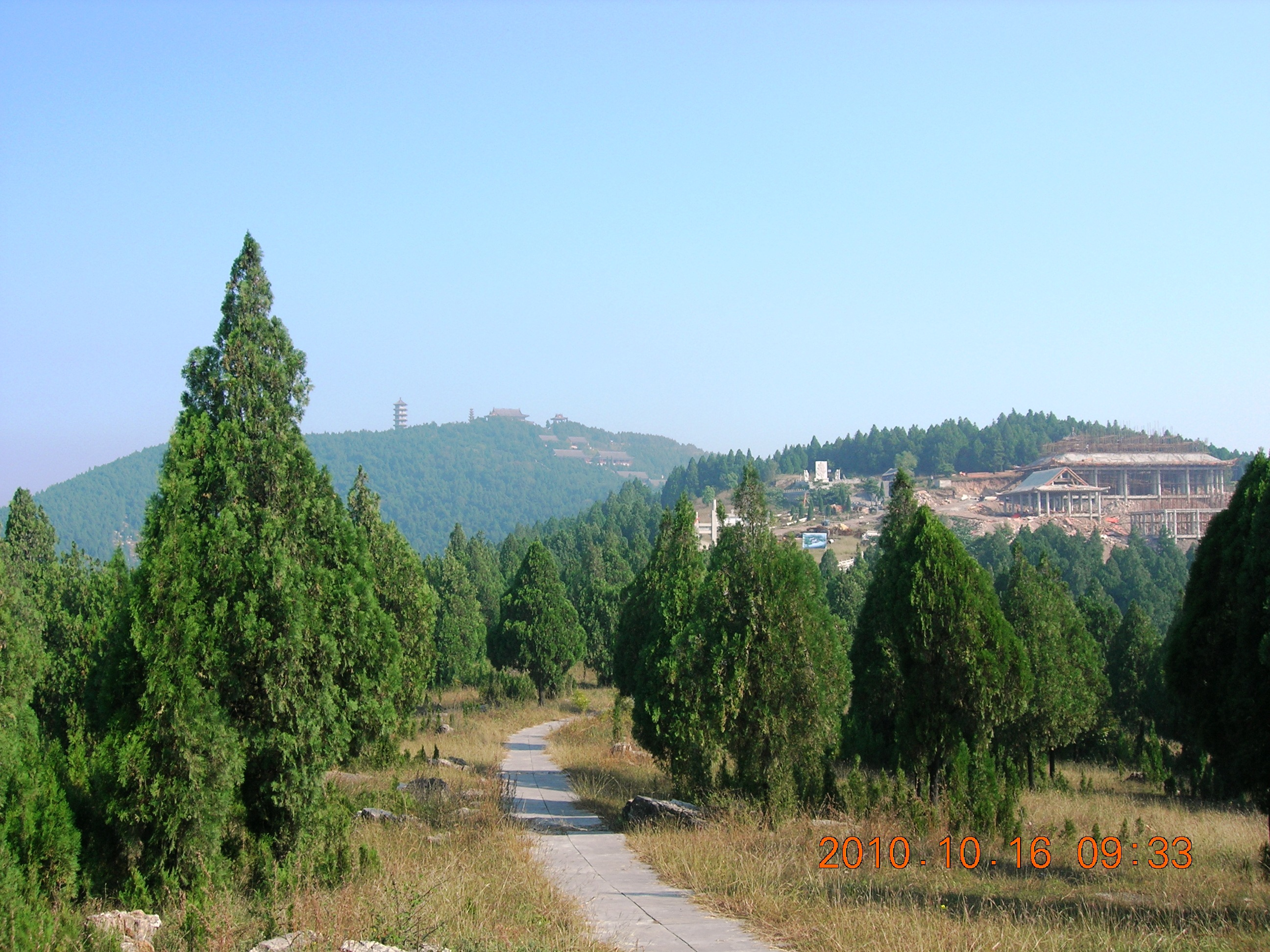

Bagongshan (Chinese: 八公山区; pinyin: Bāgōngshān Qū) is a district of the city of Huainan, Anhui Province, China.

The district is famous for its beef soup, often eaten for breakfast, its tofu, and for being the located of Bagong Mountain Scenic Spot.

== Administrative divisions ==
In the present, Bagongshan District has 3 subdistricts, 2 towns and 1 other.

3 Subdistricts

- Xinzhuangzi (新庄孜街道)
- Tubazi (土坝孜街道)
- Bijiagang (毕家岗街道)

2 Towns

- Bagongshan (八公山镇)
- Shanwang (山王镇)

1 Other

- Miaoshan Forestry (妙山林场)

== Natural resources ==
There is a considerable amount of minerals in Bagongshan District, especially coal. Marble, limestone, kaolin, mineral water, etc. can be also found here.

== See also ==
- Bagong Mountain Scenic Spot
