= Bai Yaoping =

Chinese major general (born 1962)

- 柏耀平

Deputy Commander of Northern Theater Command Navy
- Incumbent
- Assumed office July 2021
- Commander: Hu Zhongming

Personal details
- Born: November 1962 (age 63) Huainan, Anhui, China
- Party: Chinese Communist Party
- Education: PLA Air Force Xi'an Flight Academy; PLA Guangzhou Naval Academy; Kuznetsov Naval Academy

Military service
- Allegiance: People's Republic of China
- Branch/service: People's Liberation Army Air Force (1975–1991); People's Liberation Army Navy (1991–present)
- Years of service: 1975–present
- Rank: Major general

Bai Yaoping (Chinese: 柏耀平; pinyin: Bǎi Yàopíng; born November 1962) is a major general (shaojiang) of the People's Liberation Army (PLA), serving as deputy commander of Northern Theater Command Navy since July 2021. He previously served as deputy commander of Eastern Theater Command Navy.

== Biography ==
Bai was born in Huainan, Anhui, in November 1962. He enlisted in the People's Liberation Army Air Force in May 1975 and joined the Chinese Communist Party in April 1983. In July 1980, he enrolled in the PLA Air Force Aviation University and transferred to the PLA Air Force Xi'an Flight Academy in September 1980. After graduating in September 1982, he was assigned to the 2nd Brigade of the 16th Regiment of the 6th Division of the Aviation Corps of the East Sea Fleet. He became the youngest soldier in the People's Liberation Army Naval Air Force in 1983. In July 1987, he was accepted to the Pilot Captain Class of PLA Guangzhou Naval Academy (now PLA Marine Corps Training Base), where he graduated in January 1991 with the highest marks in his class.

In May 1991, he was despatched to the 6th Destroyer Detachment of the East Sea Fleet, where he successively worked as trainee vice captain, vice captain, chief of ship affairs, and chief of war at the Type 053H2G frigate Anqing. In November 1993, he was trainee captain and then captain of Type 053H2G frigate Tongling. In January 1997, he became chief of staff of the 15th Battalion of the 6th Detachment of Naval Destroyers, a position he held until December 1998, when he was promoted to captain of Chinese destroyer Hefei (132). In 2000, he was sent to study at the Kuznetsov Naval Academy in Russia. In July 2001, he was given the position of deputy leader of the 3rd Destroyer Detachment of the East Sea Fleet, and held that office until 2011, when he was appointed vice president of Dalian Naval Academy. In 2016, he was commissioned as deputy chief of staff of the Northern Theater Command Navy, and served until May 2019, when he was reassigned as deputy commander of Eastern Theater Command Navy. In July 2021, he was recalled to Northern Theater Command Navy as deputy commander.

On 20 January 2017, he was awarded the military rank of major general (shaojiang) by chairman Xi Jinping.

== Personal life ==
Bai married Wu Hong, who is a former teacher and deputy director of Kindergarten of Coal Preparation Plant of Huainan Mining Bureau (淮南市矿务局选煤厂幼儿园). Their daughter, Bai Yu (柏羽), graduated from the PLA Naval University of Engineering.
