= High School Affiliated to Anhui Normal University =

Coordinates: 31°20′35″N 118°21′50″E

- 安师大附中

Location
- 135 South Yinhu Road, Wuhu, Anhui, People's Republic of China

Information
- Type: Chinese High School
- Motto: 励志 勤学 求是 创新
- Established: 1903
- Principal: Ma Lin (马林)
- Enrollment: 2,431(Feb. 2010)
- Website: https://fz.ahnu.edu.cn/

The High School Affiliated to Anhui Normal University (Chinese: 安徽师范大学附属中学; pinyin: Ānhuī Shīfàn Dàxué Fùshǔ Zhōngxué) is a famous public high school in Wuhu City, Anhui, People's Republic of China. It was founded in 1903 and was named "Yu-Ying School" at that time. The campus is located near Mount Zhe in downtown of Wuhu, covering an area of approximately 63,400 square meters. The construction of a new campus was launched in December 2009.

== See also ==
- Anhui Normal University
