= Chinese ship Wuhu =

At least two ships of the Chinese People's Liberation Army Navy have been named Wuhu, after the Chinese city of Wuhu;

- Chinese frigate Wuhu (536), a Type 053H2 frigate in service from 1987 to 2013. It was acquired by the Bangladesh Navy and renamed BNS Ali Haider.
- Chinese frigate Wuhu (539), a Type 054A frigate, commissioned in 2017
