= Wuhu Yangtze River Bridge =

Wuhu Yangtze River Bridge 芜湖长江大桥
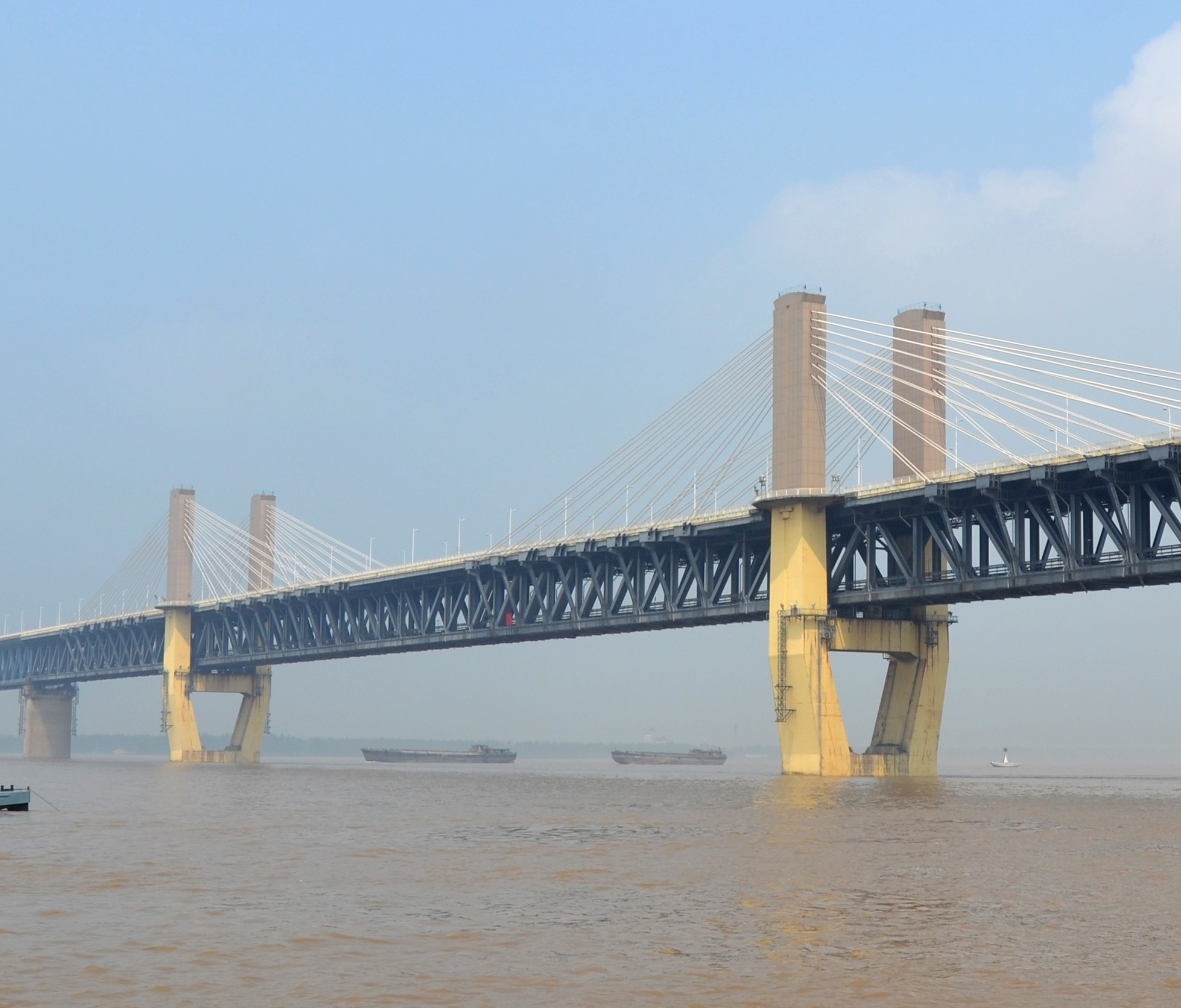
- Coordinates: 31°23′16″N 118°20′07″E
- Carries: G5011 Wuhe Expressway and Huainan Railway
- Crosses: Yangtze river
- Locale: Wuhu, Anhui, China

Characteristics
- Design: extradosed bridge
- Total length: 10,521 metres (34,518 ft)
- Longest span: 312 metres (1,024 ft)

History
- Construction end: 2000

Location
- Interactive map of Wuhu Yangtze River Bridge

The Wuhu Yangtze River Bridge (simplified Chinese: 芜湖长江大桥; traditional Chinese: 蕪湖長江大橋; pinyin: Wúhú Chángjiāng Dàqiáo) is a combined highway and railway bridge over the Yangtze river. The bridge is located in Wuhu, Anhui, China, and was completed in 2000. The extradosed bridge consists of a 312-metre (1,024 ft) main span and two 180-metre (591 ft) side spans and has, together with all approaches, a total length of 10,521 metres (34,518 ft). The bridges carries four lanes of the G5011 Wuhu–Hefei Expressway on the upper deck and the dual-track Huainan Railway on the lower deck.

== See also ==
- Yangtze River bridges and tunnels
