= Gaotang Lake =

- 高塘湖 (Chinese)
- Location within China
- Location: Anhui
- Coordinates: 32.659°N 117.176°E
- Type: lake
- Primary inflows: Yao River (窑河)
- Primary outflows: Huaihe River
- Max. length: 16 km (9.9 mi)
- Max. width: 3 km (1.9 mi)
- Surface area: 50 km^{2} (19 sq mi)
- Average depth: 1.73 m (5.7 ft)
- Max. depth: 2.5 m (8.2 ft)
- Water volume: 85×10^{6} m^{3} (3.0×10^{9} cu ft)
- Surface elevation: 15 m (49 ft)
- Settlements: Huainan

Gaotang lake is a shallow freshwater lake in China's Anhui province, on the borders of Huainan, Dingyuan County and Fengyang County. The lake is intensively used for aquaculture (black carp among others).

In 1956, a sluice was built in the outflow of the lake, mainly to prevent water from the Huaihe River from moving upstream.
