= Huainan =

Prefecture-level city in Anhui, People's Republic of China

Huainan 淮南市 Hwainan
- Prefecture-level city
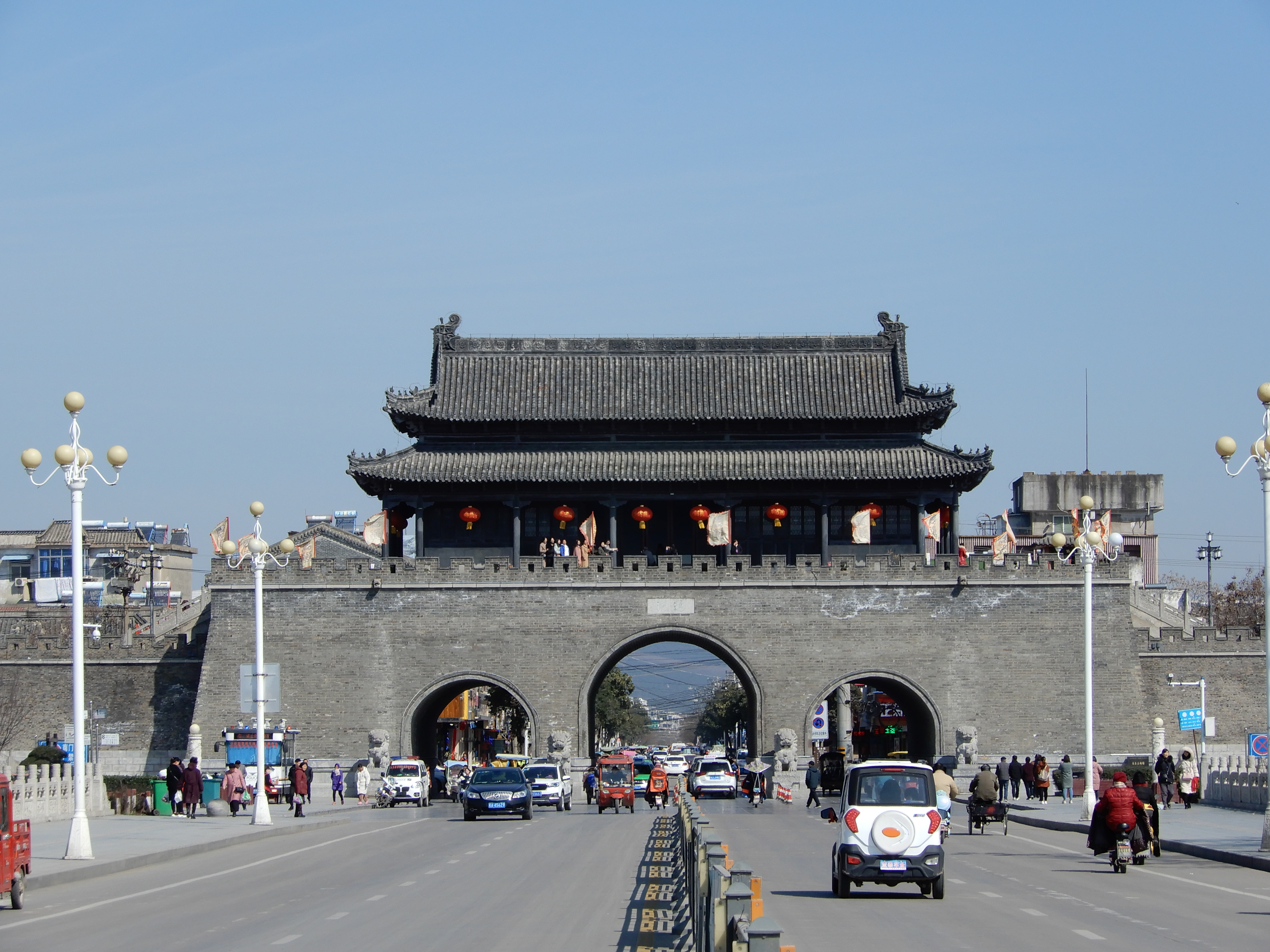

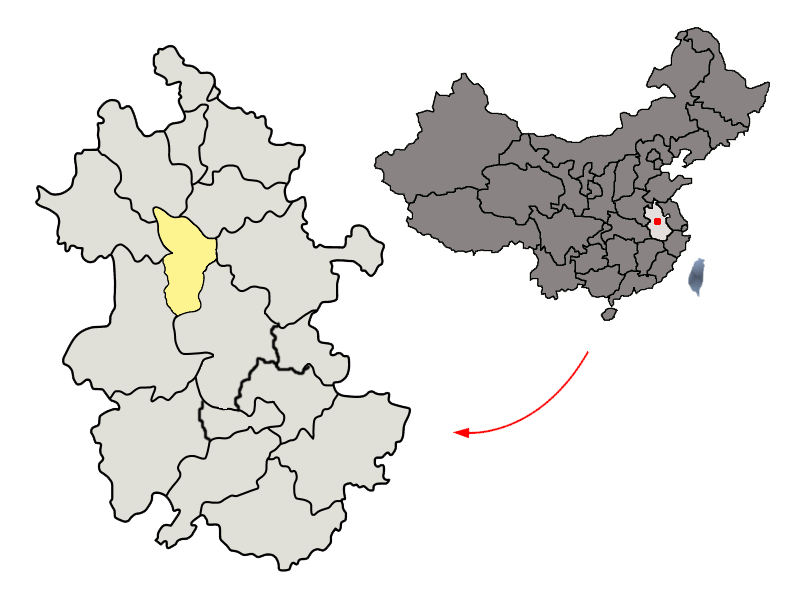
- Location of Huainan City jurisdiction in Anhui
- Coordinates (Huainan railway station plaza): 32°37′53″N 117°01′10″E
- Country: People's Republic of China
- Province: Anhui
- County-level divisions: 7
- Township-level divisions: 90
- Municipal seat: Tianjia'an District

Government
  - CPC Secretary: Shen Qiang (沈强)
  - Mayor: Wang Hong (王宏)

Area
  - Prefecture-level city: 5,530 km^{2} (2,140 sq mi)
  - Urban: 1,500.2 km^{2} (579.2 sq mi)
  - Metro: 1,989.7 km^{2} (768.2 sq mi)

Population (2020 census)
  - Prefecture-level city: 3,033,528
  - Density: 549/km^{2} (1,420/sq mi)
  - Urban: 1,561,636
  - Urban density: 1,041.0/km^{2} (2,696.1/sq mi)
  - Metro: 1,868,944
  - Metro density: 939.31/km^{2} (2,432.8/sq mi)

GDP
  - Prefecture-level city: CN¥ 145.7 billion US$ 18.9 billion
  - Per capita: CN¥ 47,929; US$ 7,430
- Time zone: UTC+8 (CST)
- Postal code: 232000
- Area code: 554
- ISO 3166 code: CN-AH-04
- License plate Prefix: 皖D

Huainan
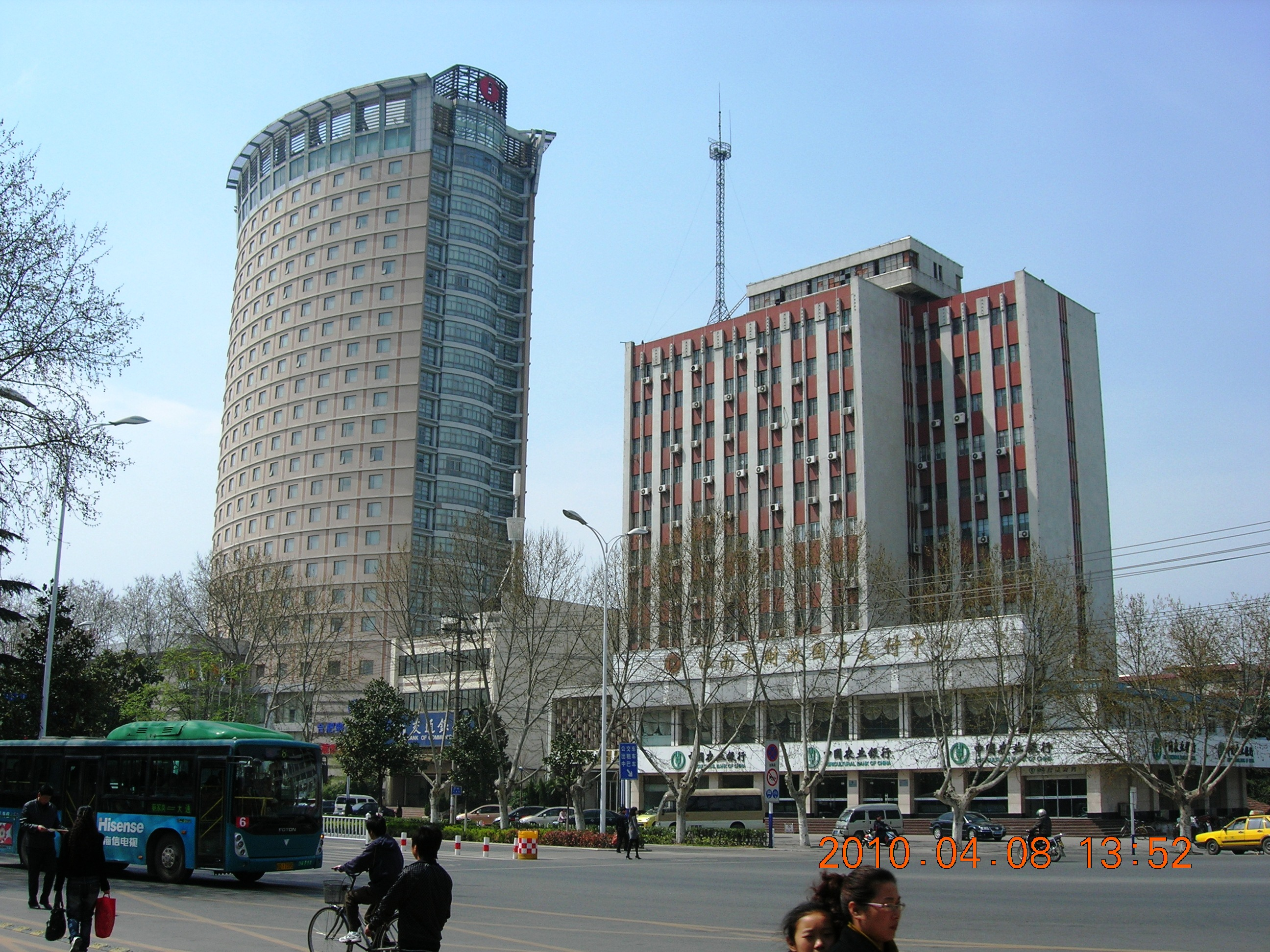
- Chinese: 淮南
- Literal meaning: [Land(s)] South of the Huai River
Transcriptions
Standard Mandarin
- Hanyu Pinyin: Huáinán
- Wade–Giles: Huai-nan

Huainan (Chinese: 淮南; pinyin: Huáinán) is a prefecture-level city with 3,033,528 inhabitants as of the 2020 census in north-central Anhui province, China. It is named for the Han-era Principality of Huainan. It borders the provincial capital of Hefei to the south, Lu'an to the southwest, Fuyang to the west, Bozhou to the northwest, Bengbu to the northeast and Chuzhou to the east. Huainan is one of the core cities of Hefei Metropolitan Circle and is known for its coal industry and thermal power plants. Its built-up area made of 4 urban districts (all but Panji not yet conurbated) and Fengtai County largely being urbanized, was home to 1,868,944 inhabitants as of 2020. Its city flower is the Chinese rose (Rosa chinensis) and its city tree is the Old-World Plane Tree (Platanus orientalis). It is also considered to be the hometown and birthplace of tofu.

== Administration ==
Historical population
Year	Pop.	±%
1953	286,941	—
1964	456,223	+59.0%
1982	576,605	+26.4%
1990	724,157	+25.6%
2000	1,062,430	+46.7%
2010	1,238,488	+16.6%
2020	1,255,619	+1.4%
Source: Census in China

The prefecture-level city of Huainan administers seven county-level divisions, including five districts and two counties.

- Tianjia'an District (田家庵区)
- Panji District (潘集区)
- Xiejiaji District (谢家集区)
- Datong District (大通区)
- Bagongshan District (八公山区)
- Fengtai County (凤台县)
- Shou County (寿县)

These are further divided into 66 township-level divisions, including 24 towns, 23 townships and 19 subdistricts.

Map
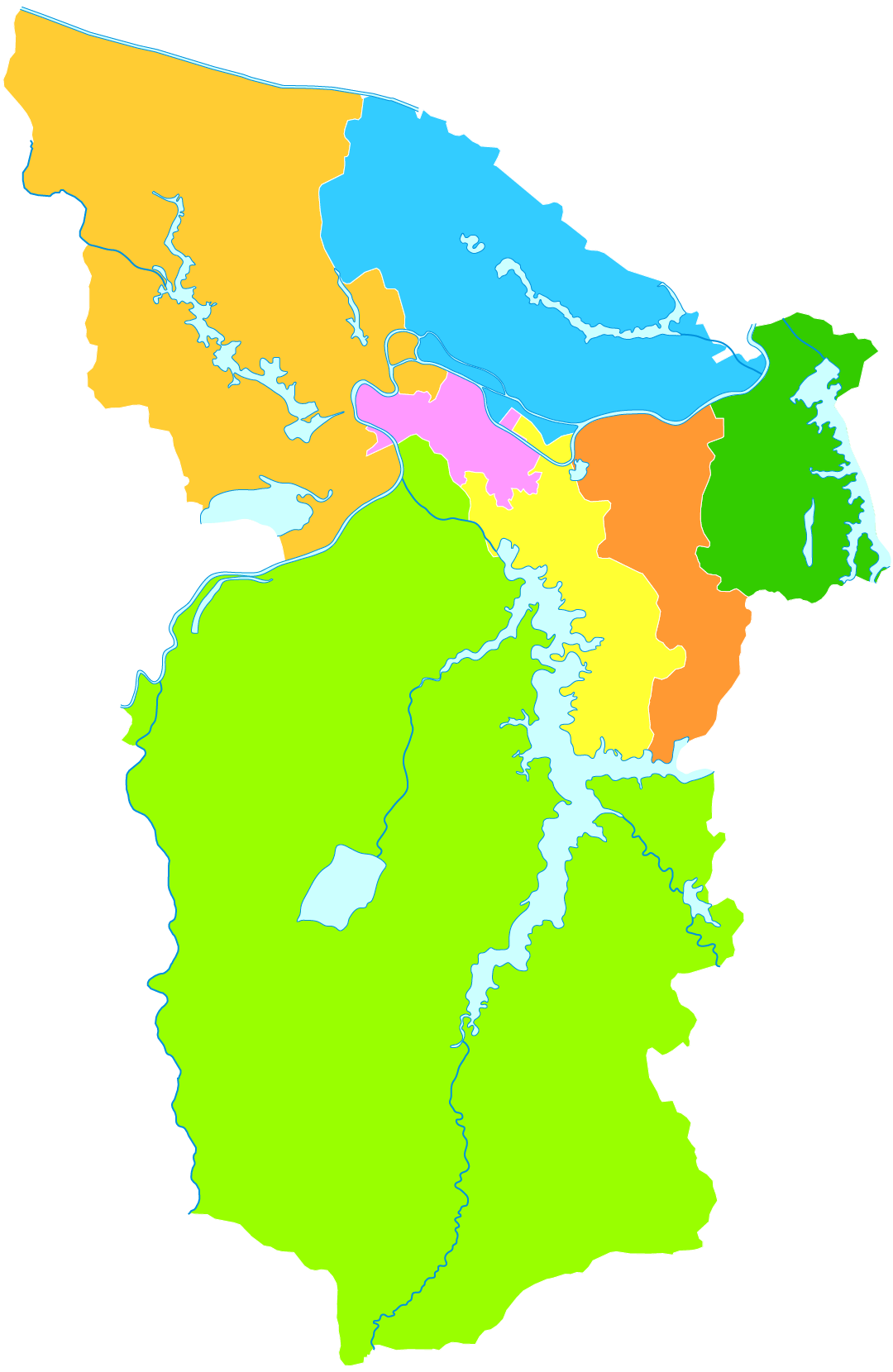

=== High-tech development zone ===
- Shannan New Area (山南新区)

== Geography ==
The urban centre is located on a plain on the south bank of the Huai River, bordering Gaotang Lake on the east and a forested hill area on the south. To the west are Bagongshan District and Shou County.

=== Climate ===
Climate data for Huainan, elevation 71 m (233 ft), (1991–2020 normals, extremes 1981–present)
Month	Jan	Feb	Mar	Apr	May	Jun	Jul	Aug	Sep	Oct	Nov	Dec	Year
Record high °C (°F)	19.9 (67.8)	26.5 (79.7)	34.3 (93.7)	34.6 (94.3)	37.3 (99.1)	38.7 (101.7)	40.0 (104.0)	39.3 (102.7)	38.1 (100.6)	34.0 (93.2)	29.5 (85.1)	23.1 (73.6)	40.0 (104.0)
Mean daily maximum °C (°F)	6.8 (44.2)	9.9 (49.8)	15.3 (59.5)	22.0 (71.6)	27.2 (81.0)	30.4 (86.7)	32.5 (90.5)	31.6 (88.9)	27.7 (81.9)	22.7 (72.9)	15.9 (60.6)	9.2 (48.6)	20.9 (69.7)
Daily mean °C (°F)	2.9 (37.2)	5.6 (42.1)	10.5 (50.9)	16.8 (62.2)	22.3 (72.1)	26.0 (78.8)	28.6 (83.5)	27.7 (81.9)	23.5 (74.3)	18.1 (64.6)	11.4 (52.5)	5.1 (41.2)	16.5 (61.8)
Mean daily minimum °C (°F)	−0.1 (31.8)	2.3 (36.1)	6.7 (44.1)	12.4 (54.3)	17.9 (64.2)	22.1 (71.8)	25.4 (77.7)	24.6 (76.3)	20.1 (68.2)	14.4 (57.9)	7.8 (46.0)	2.0 (35.6)	13.0 (55.3)
Record low °C (°F)	−12.2 (10.0)	−13.0 (8.6)	−4.5 (23.9)	0.4 (32.7)	7.3 (45.1)	11.9 (53.4)	18.4 (65.1)	15.9 (60.6)	10.9 (51.6)	1.3 (34.3)	−6.2 (20.8)	−15.7 (3.7)	−15.7 (3.7)
Average precipitation mm (inches)	36.9 (1.45)	40.6 (1.60)	59.3 (2.33)	61.1 (2.41)	78.9 (3.11)	173.0 (6.81)	183.0 (7.20)	140.7 (5.54)	81.0 (3.19)	54.6 (2.15)	48.0 (1.89)	26.9 (1.06)	984 (38.74)
Average precipitation days (≥ 0.1 mm)	7.3	8.0	8.7	8.1	9.4	9.9	11.8	12.6	8.3	7.6	7.9	6.2	105.8
Average snowy days	4.2	2.7	1.1	0	0	0	0	0	0	0	0.7	1.5	10.2
Average relative humidity (%)	69	69	64	64	65	71	77	79	75	68	68	68	70
Mean monthly sunshine hours	126.1	123.8	168.3	193.2	196.7	177.5	193.0	182.1	157.7	164.4	148.4	133.6	1,964.8
Percentage possible sunshine	40	39	45	49	46	42	45	45	43	47	48	43	44
Source: China Meteorological Administration

== Economy ==
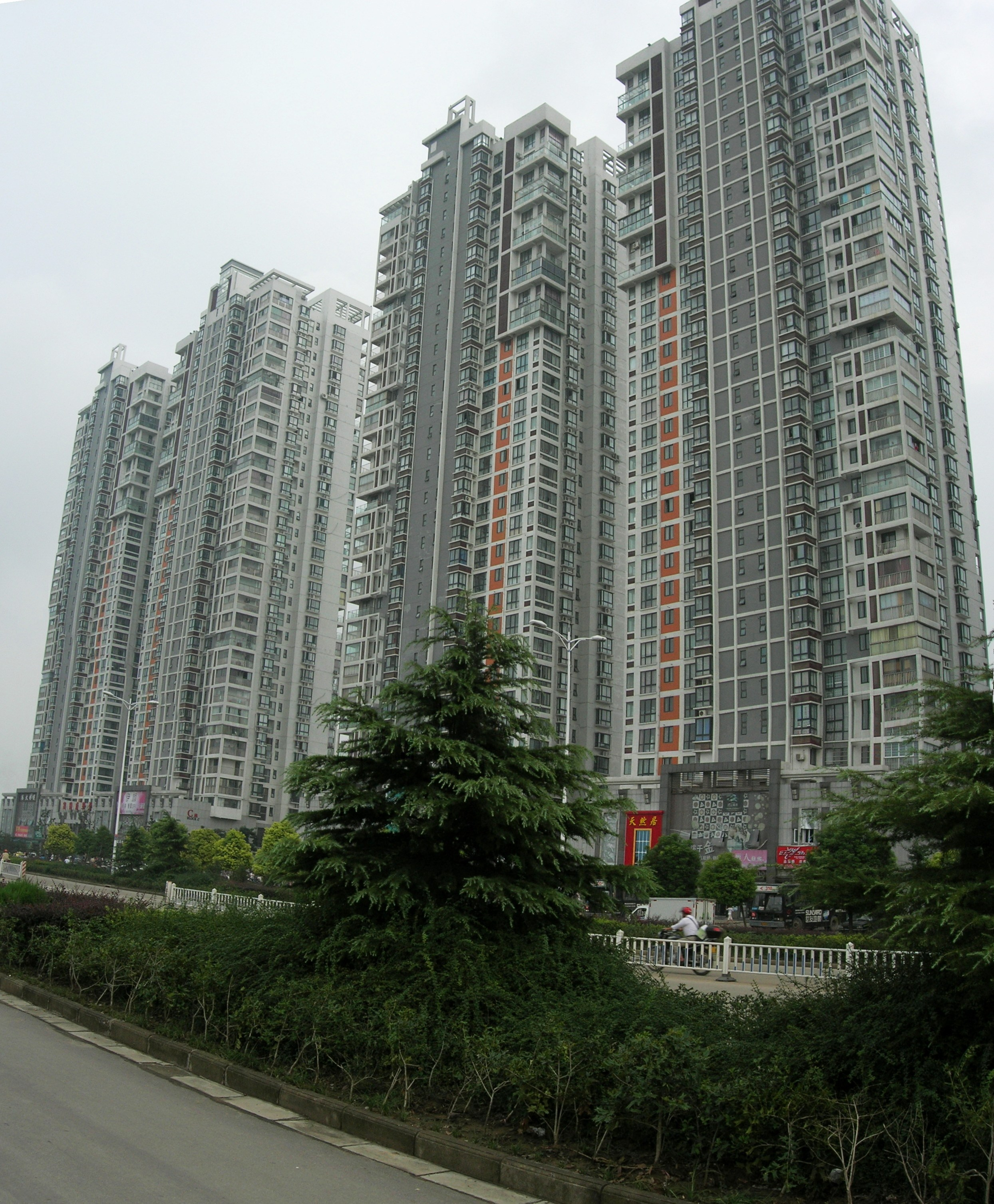
High rise apartments, 2010

Huainan is a major production center for coal, with an output of 43.28 million tons in 2006.

The city hosted the 17th China Tofu Cultural Festival on September 15–17, 2010, including the National Bean Products Exhibition.

== Education ==
- Anhui University of Science and Technology (安徽理工大学) official website
- Huainan Normal University (淮南师范学院) official website
- Huainan United University (淮南联合大学) official website
- Huainan Vocational Technical College (淮南职业技术学院) official website
- Anhui Industry&Trade Vocational Technical College (安徽工贸职业技术学院) official website
- Anhui Modern Information Engineering College (安徽现代信息工程职业学院) official website

The key high schools:

- Huainan No.1 High School (淮南一中)
- Huainan No.2 High School (淮南二中)
- Huainan No.5 High School (淮南五中)
- Huainan No.4 High School (淮南四中)
- Fengtai No.1 High School (凤台一中)
- Shouxian No.1 High School (寿县一中)

== Transportation ==
East of the city a bridge crosses the Huai River, shared by the Fuyang–Huainan railway and highway S225. Near the city center, a ferry provides connection to the (rural) north bank of the Huai River.

=== Rail ===
- Huainan railway station, terminus of the Fuyang–Huainan railway and Huainan Railway
- Huainan East railway station (high-speed services) on the Hefei–Bengbu high-speed railway
- Huainan South railway station (high-speed services) on the Shangqiu–Hangzhou high-speed railway

=== Highway ===
Expressways

- S17 Benghe Expressway
- S12 Chuxin Expressway

National Highways

- G206

== Notable people ==
- Bai Yaoping, major general

== See also ==
- List of twin towns and sister cities in China
- Yuan You
- Huainan biota
