= St. Joseph Cathedral, Wuhu =

Coordinates: 31.3300°N 118.3300°E

St. Joseph Cathedral
- 芜湖圣若瑟主教座堂
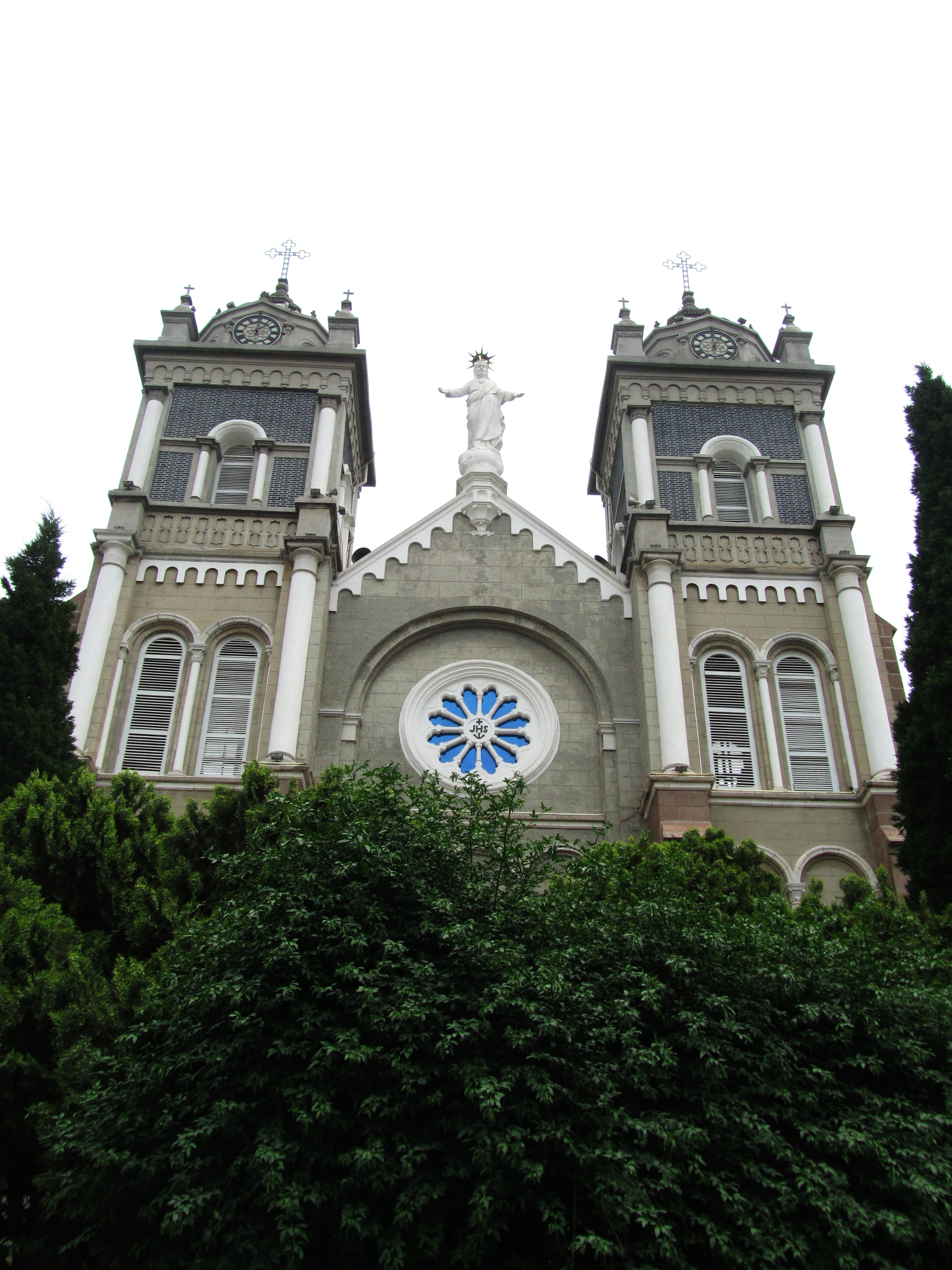
- St. Joseph Cathedral
- Location: Wuhu
- Country: China
- Denomination: Roman Catholic Church

The Cathedral of St. Joseph (Chinese: 芜湖圣若瑟主教座堂), located in Wuhu, is the seat of the Latin bishop of the Catholic Diocese of Wuhu. It is one of the largest Catholic buildings in Anhui, China.

The cathedral owes its construction to the French Jesuits, including Joseph Seckinger, who established themselves in Wuhu in 1883.

In 1889, the church was completed despite the opposition of Chinese nationalists, who were engaged in efforts from May 1888 to stop its construction through boycotts and hostile demonstrations. A hospital and school were also built, intended in particular for the care of orphans and patients without resources.

In 1891, the Gelaohui, a xenophobic secret organization, led the opposition against the church. After a priest was accused of kidnapping children and two nuns, a crowd set fire to the cathedral, hospital and school. The initial protest quickly became a riot, in which the British consulate in Wuhu was also attacked. The Qing government intervened to take control of the city and eliminate its leaders.

The church was rebuilt in 1895 thanks to financial compensation from the Chinese authorities. It was designated the cathedral of the Apostolic Vicariate of Anhui at its erection in 1921, and remained cathedral of the Diocese of Wuhu at its erection in 1946.

In 1966, during the Cultural Revolution, the cathedral was severely damaged. It was restored in 1983.

There are daily Masses (6:30 am Monday through Friday and 8:00 am on Sundays).

== See also ==
- Catholic Church in China
- List of Jesuit sites
