= Sanshan District =

Sanshan 三山区
- District
- Interactive map of Sanshan
- Coordinates: 31°13′11″N 118°16′05″E
- Country: China
- Province: Anhui
- City: Wuhu
- Time zone: UTC+8 (China Standard)

Sanshan District (Chinese: 三山区; pinyin: Sānshān Qū) is a district of the city of Wuhu, Anhui Province, located on the southern (right) bank of the Yangtze to the southwest of the city center.
