= Huainan Railway =

Railway line in China

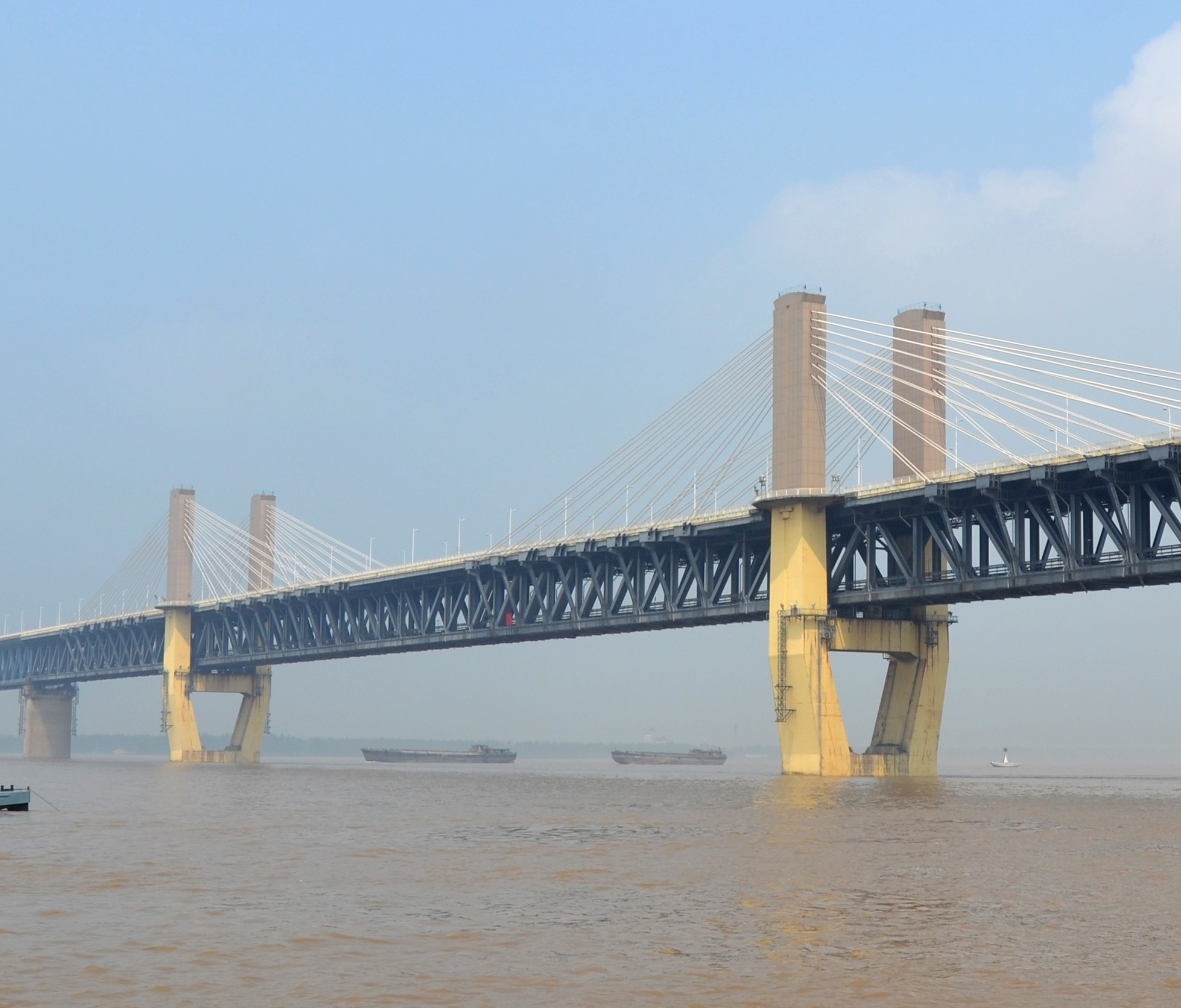
- Wuhu Yangtze River Bridge

Overview
- Status: Operational
- Termini: Huainan; Wuhu
- Stations: 28

Service
- Type: Heavy rail
- System: China Railway
- Operator(s): CR Shanghai

Technical
- Line length: 317.5 km (197.3 mi)
- Number of tracks: 2
- Track gauge: 1,435 mm (4 ft 8 1/2 in) standard gauge
- Operating speed: 120 kilometres per hour (75 mph)
- Signalling: ABS

The Huainan Railway (Chinese: 淮南铁路; pinyin: Huáinán tiělù) runs from Huainan station in Anhui province to Zhouqujia station in Wuhu, which is located on the Yangtze. The Huainan Line currently has 317.5 km (197.3 mi) of main line, 152.4 km (94.7 mi) of station track, 38.1 km (23.7 mi) of "special" track, and a total of 49 large and small stations.

== History ==
The Huainan Railway was built to transport coal from Huainan to the Yangtze. The route was planned by Cheng Shifan, who was appointed as the director of the Huainan Coal Mine Railway Engineering Department. Construction officially started in June 1934, and passenger services from Huainan to Hefei commenced on 1 February 1935. It was completed on 12 December 1935. Due to infringement issues with the Tianjin–Pukou railway, the original name "Tongjiang Railway" (通江铁路) was changed to Huainan Coal Mine Railway" (淮南煤矿铁路). The roadbed was designed as a regular railway, but narrow-gauge light rail and corresponding sleepers were laid. There are more than 20 stations along the line, of which Huainan West (Tianjia'an), Datong, Jiulonggang and Hefei are relatively large.

All funds for the construction of the Huainan Railway were allocated by the Nanjing government. On 26 October 1937, the Nanjing government construction committee transferred the Huainan Railway and the Huainan Coal Mine to the China Construction Bank Corporation, which was affiliated with group of T. V. Soong (Song Ziwen), and turned it into a private enterprise, renamed the Huainan Railway and Mining Company, which unified the operation of the coal mining and the railway. The board of directors of Huainan Railway and Mining Company consisted of 12 people including Song Ziwen, Zhang Jingjiang, Cheng Shifan and Du Yuesheng.

After its completion, the Huainan Railway used 16 improved locomotives, more than 300 coal cars and one passenger car imported from Czechoslovakia. It was centered in Jiulonggang, and its dispatching, management and maintenance agencies were all located in Jiulonggang.

In the spring of 1938, the Japanese army invaded Nanjing, and the Nanjing government ordered the entire Huainan Railway to be blown up. On 4 June 1938, the Japanese army occupied the Huainan mining area and the railway; on 21 April 1939, the Japanese "East Asia Liaison Department in China" merged the Datong Mine and the Jiulonggang Mine, and together with the Wang Jingwei regime, formed the Huainan Coal Mining Co., Ltd. The company's headquarters was located in Shanghai and was under the control of the Japanese military. At this time, railway transportation had been destroyed, and coal produced at the mine was transported to Tianjia'an Wharf by pulling coal cars on the railway with manpower or horses.

In 1940, the Japanese East China Railway Company repaired the railway from Jiulonggang to Yuxikou and deployed 32 locomotives to resume railway transportation from Jiulonggang to Huainan West and Jiulonggang to Yuxikou. Later, the Shuijiahu–Bengbu railway (Shuijiahu to Bengbu) was built and connected to the Tianjin–Pukou railway, making it easier to transport coal to Nanjing and Shanghai. The current railway passenger fare mileage table shows the Bengbu–Shuijiahu section as the Huainan Line, while the Shuijiahu–Huainan section is shown as the Shuizhang Line.

After Japan surrendered at the end of 1945, the Huainan Coal Mine and Railway were again taken over by Song Ziwen's Huainan Railway and Mining Company. After 1949, it was under the jurisdiction of the Shanghai Railway Bureau.

In 1958, the ferry from Yuxikou station to Wuhu North station was completed and opened to navigation.

In September 2000, with the completion and opening of the Wuhu Yangtze River Bridge, the Wuyu railway ferry was closed and stopped operating. Wuhu North Station also stopped handling passenger services. The station has since been renamed Erba station.

In January 2010, the Huainan Railway (Huainan–Hefei section) electrification and capacity expansion project started, followed by the Hefei to Wuhu section at the end of 2014. The electrification of the whole line was completed and opened to traffic on 29 December 2016.
