= Tianjia'an, Huainan =

Tianjia'an 田家庵区 Tienkiaan
- District
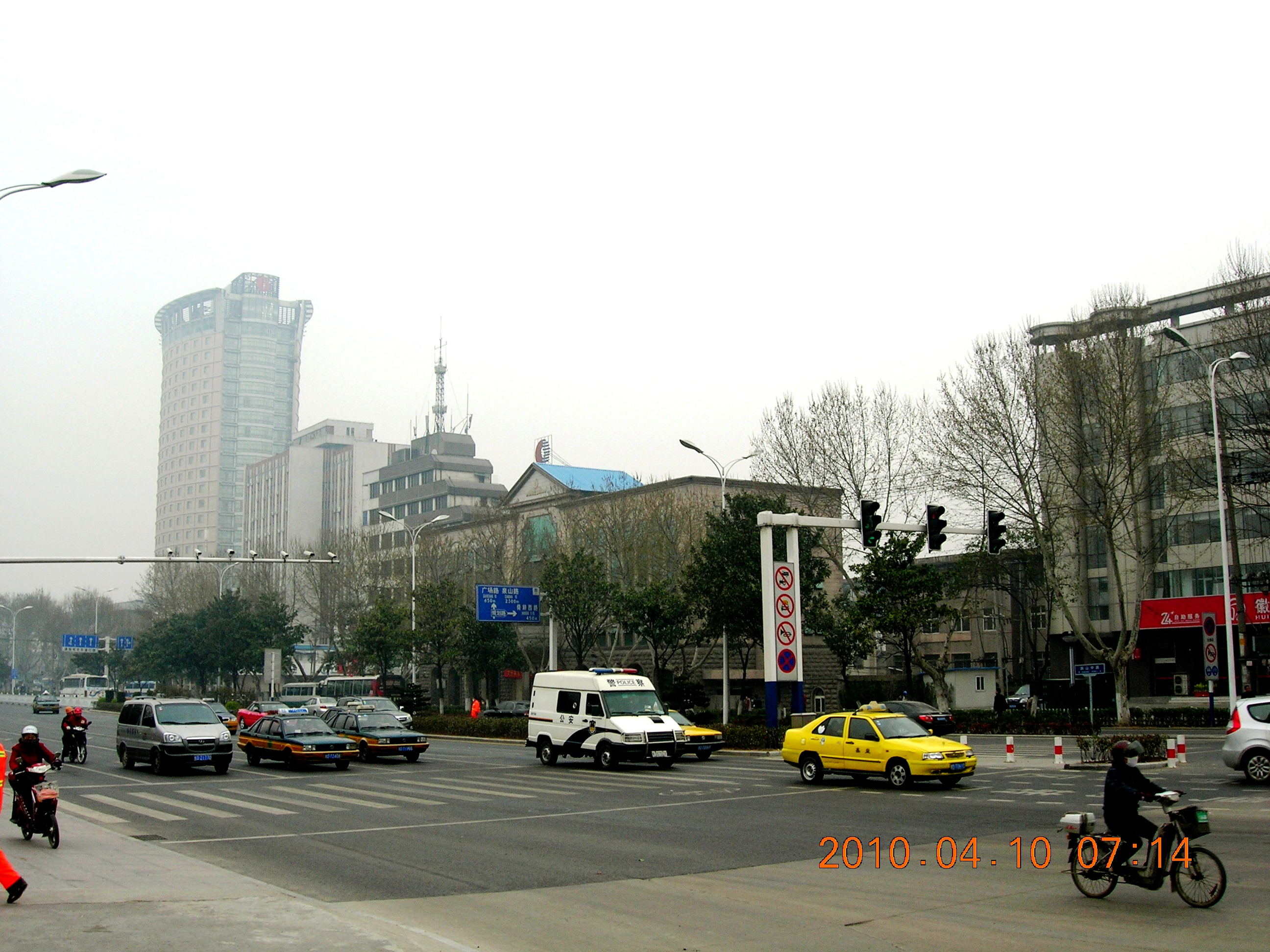
- Interactive map of Tianjia'an
- Coordinates: 32°39′19″N 117°02′30″E
- Country: China
- Province: Anhui
- Prefecture-level city: Huainan
- District seat: Guoqing Subdistrict

Area
  - Total: 255.7 km^{2} (98.7 sq mi)

Population (2020)
  - Total: 730,078
  - Density: 2,855/km^{2} (7,395/sq mi)
- Time zone: UTC+8 (China Standard)
- Postal code: 232000

Tianjia'an (Chinese: 田家庵; pinyin: Tiánjiā'ān) is a district in the city of Huainan, Anhui Province, China. It is known for several places including Longhu Park, Shungeng Mountain, and Commerce And Culture Square.

== Administrative divisions ==
In the present, Tianjia'an District has 9 subdistricts, 4 towns and 1 township.

9 Subdistricts

- Dongshan (洞山街道)
- Huaibin (淮滨街道)
- Tiandong (田东街道)
- Longquan (龙泉街道)
- Guoqing (国庆街道)
- Chaoyang (朝阳街道)
- Quanshan (泉山街道)
- Gongyuan (公园街道)
- Xinhuai (新淮街道)

4 towns

- Shungeng (舜耕镇)
- Ancheng (安成镇)
- Cao'an (曹庵镇)
- Sanhe (三和镇)

1 township

- Shiyuan Township (史院乡)
