= Muwen River =

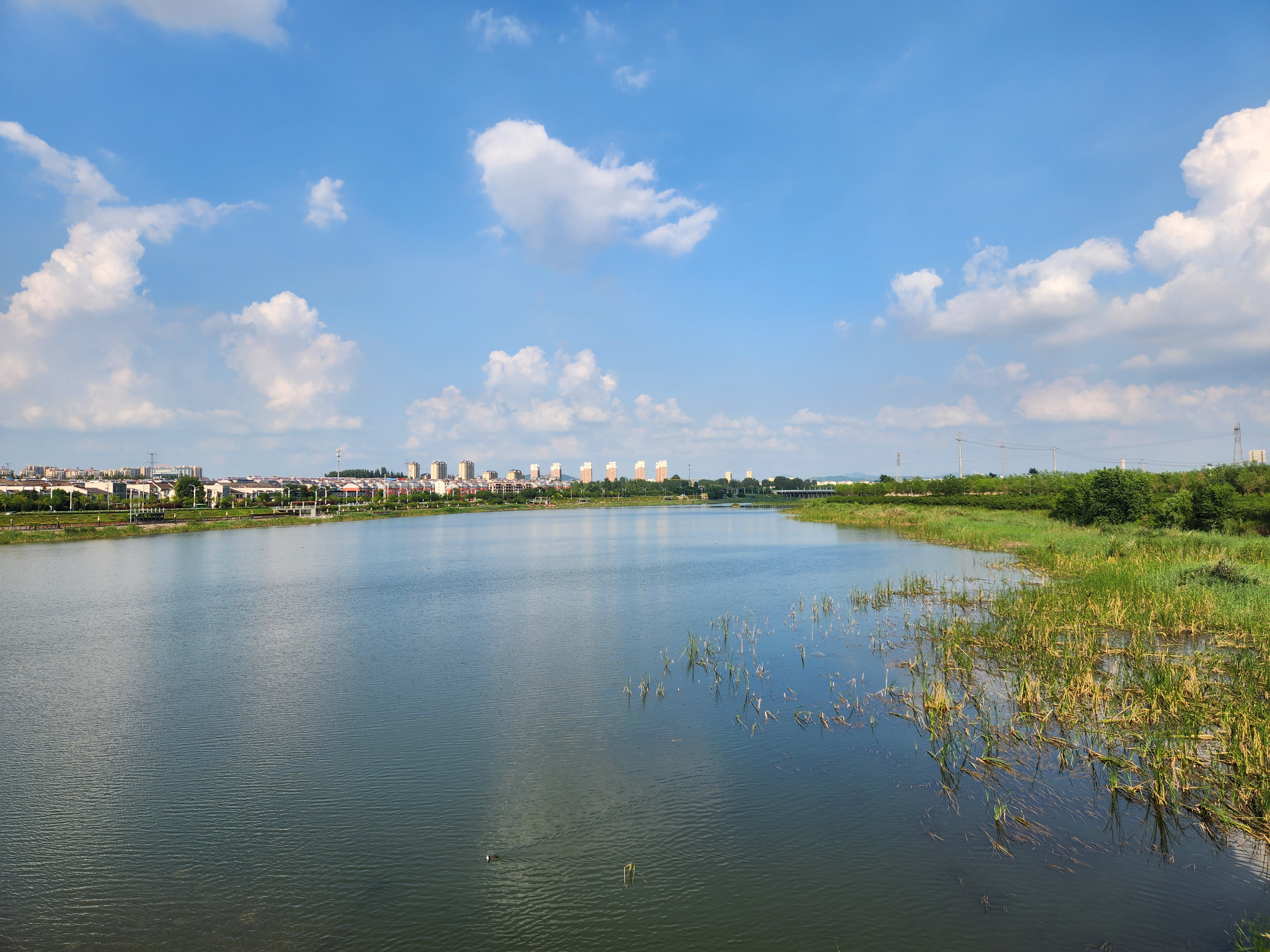
- Taken at the south of Guan Chang Village, 2023 Summer

- Estuary in Shandong Province

Physical characteristics
- Source: source of Muwen River
  - location: Sha Yai Zi Village, Da Zhang Zhuang Town, Yiyuan County
  - coordinates: 35.991°N 117.963°E
- 2nd source: source of Yan Zhuang River
  - location: Li Xin Subdistrict, Gangcheng District
  - coordinates: 36.162°N 117.868°E
- Mouth: Da Wen Kou
  - location: Da Wen Kou Town, Daiyue District
  - coordinates: 35.953°N 117.107°E
- Length: 132.8 kilometres (82.5 mi)
- Basin size: 2,698.96 square kilometres (1,042.07 sq mi)
- Width
  - average: 0.4 kilometres (0.25 mi)

Basin features
- Progression: west
- River system: Yellow River System
- Tributaries
  - left: Zhang Ba Qiu River, Qing Shui River, Miao Zi River, Xin Zhuang River, Si Ma River, Long Ma River, Ying Wen River, Pan Wen River and Victory River
  - right: Xia Feng River, Huang Zhuang River, Yan Zhuang River, Yan Wang River, Xiao Yi River and Tao River

Muwen River (Chinese: 牟汶河) is a tributary of Dawen River that originates in Lu Mountain in Laiwu District, flows through Taishan District, confluences with Chaiwen River, and becomes Dawen River. The total length of the river is 208 kilometers, and its flow often stops during the dry season. Before the liberation, the current volume was high and often washed the dike down. Largely complicated reinforcements were made 6 times, and 6 medium and 18 small reservoirs were built.
