= Miaoshan =

Miaoshan may refer to:

- Miaoshan, a legendary Chinese princess who became the bodhisattva Guanyin
- Miaoshan, Jinan, a town in Shandong, China
- Miaoshan, Tancheng County, a town in Shandong, China
- Miaoshan High-tech Industrial Park, Wuhan, Hubei, China
