= Hezhuang =

Hezhuang may refer to the following locations in China:

Towns

- Hezhuang, Xinzheng (和庄镇), in Xinzheng, Henan
- Hezhuang, Hangzhou (河庄镇), in Xiaoshan District, Hangzhou, Zhejiang

Townships

- Hezhuang Township, Wuqiao County (何庄乡), Hebei
- Hezhuang Township, Laiwu (和庄乡), in Laicheng District, Laiwu, Shandong
