= Taishan District =

Taishan District (Chinese: 泰山区; pinyin: Tàishān Qū) may refer to:

- Taishan District, Tai'an, in Shandong, PR China
- Taishan District, New Taipei, in Taiwan
