= Beishanyang =

Beishanyang 北山阳
- Village
- Interactive map of Beishanyang
- Coordinates: 35°19′N 118°03′E
- Country: China
- Province: Shandong
- District: Laiwu District
- Subdistrict: Kouzhen
- Time zone: UTC8
- Postal code: 271100
- Area code: 0634

Beishanyang (Chinese: 北山阳; pinyin: Běishānyáng) is a village located in Kouzhen (口镇街道), Laiwu District, Jinan, Shandong Province of the People's Republic of China.
