= Tai'an =

Prefecture-level city in Shandong, China

Tai'an 泰安市
- Prefecture-level city
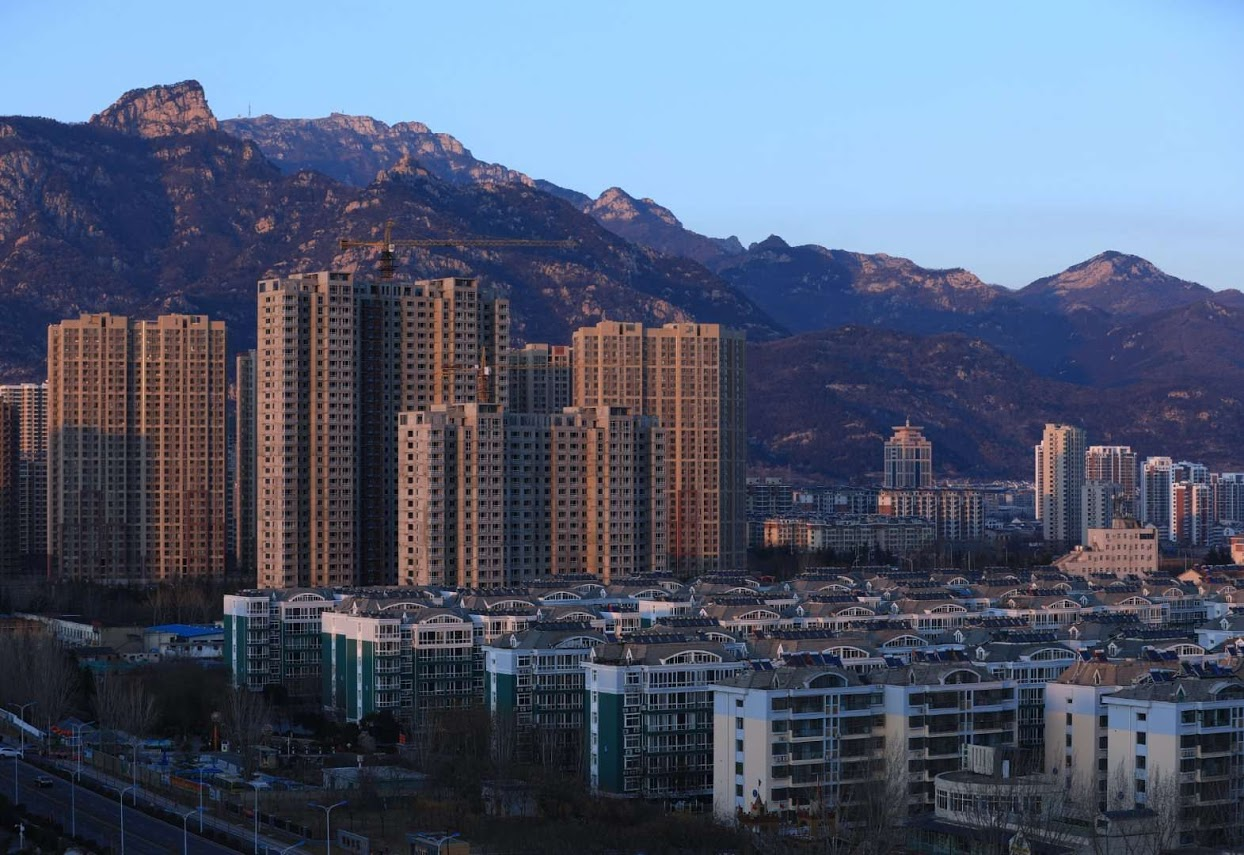
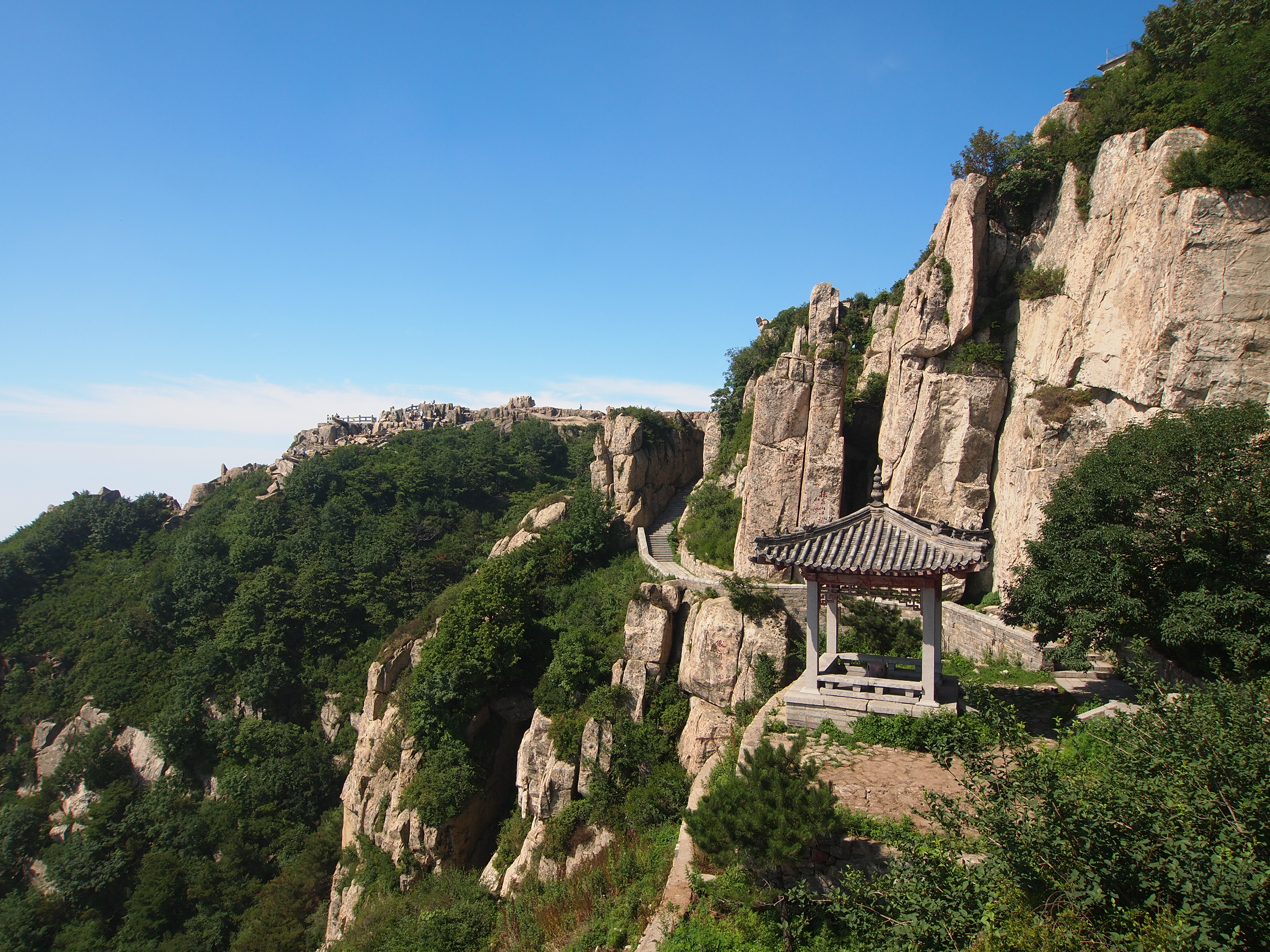
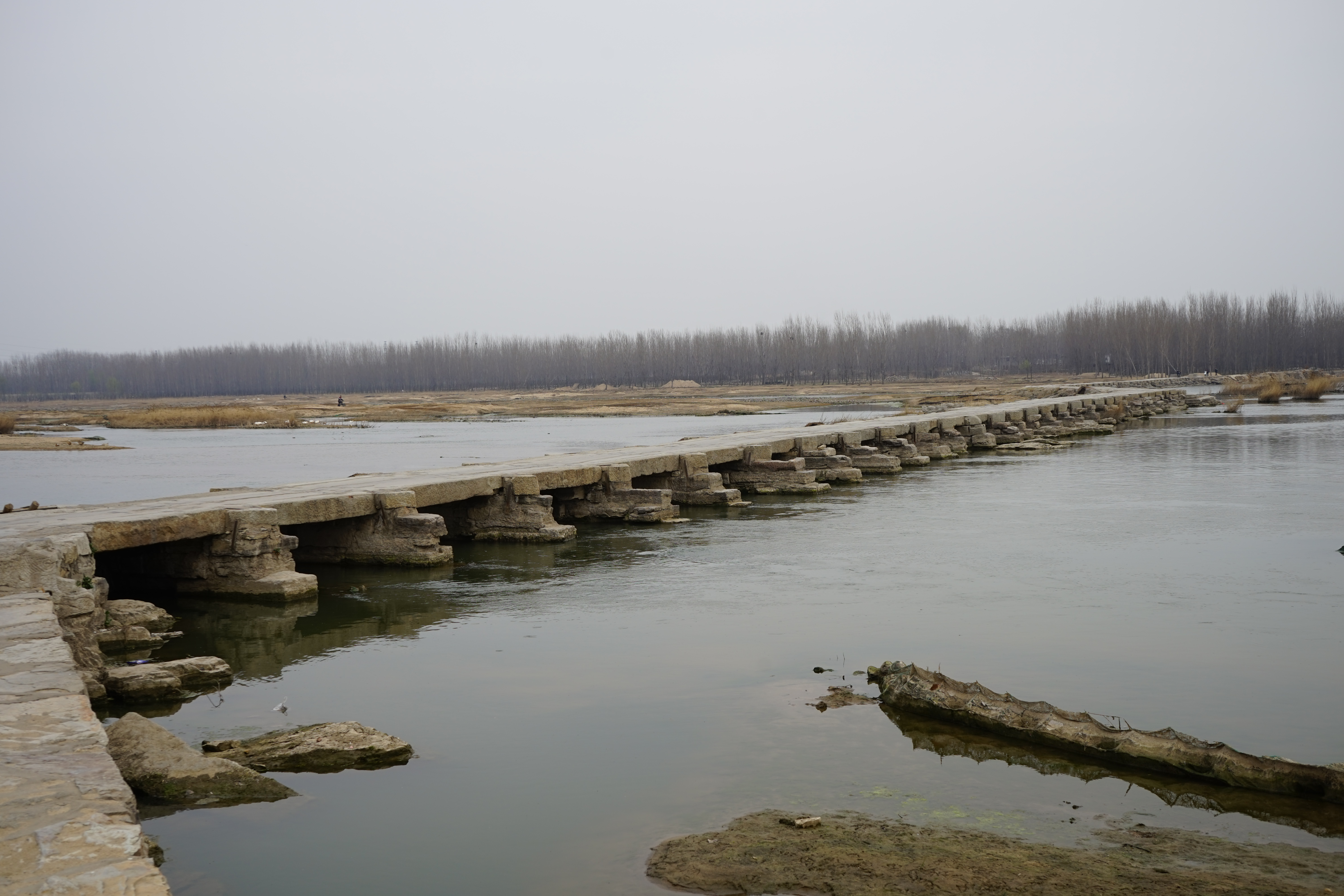
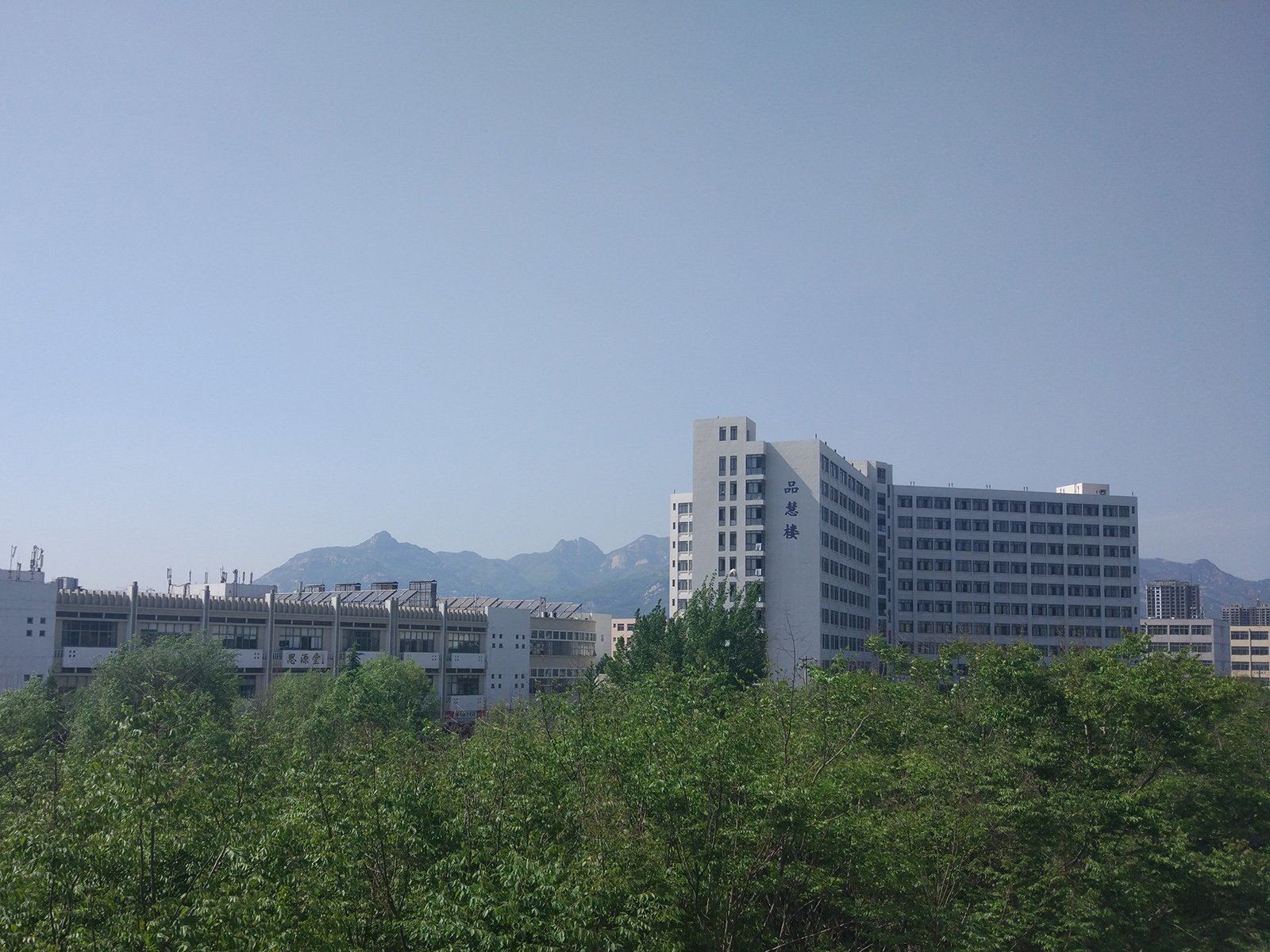
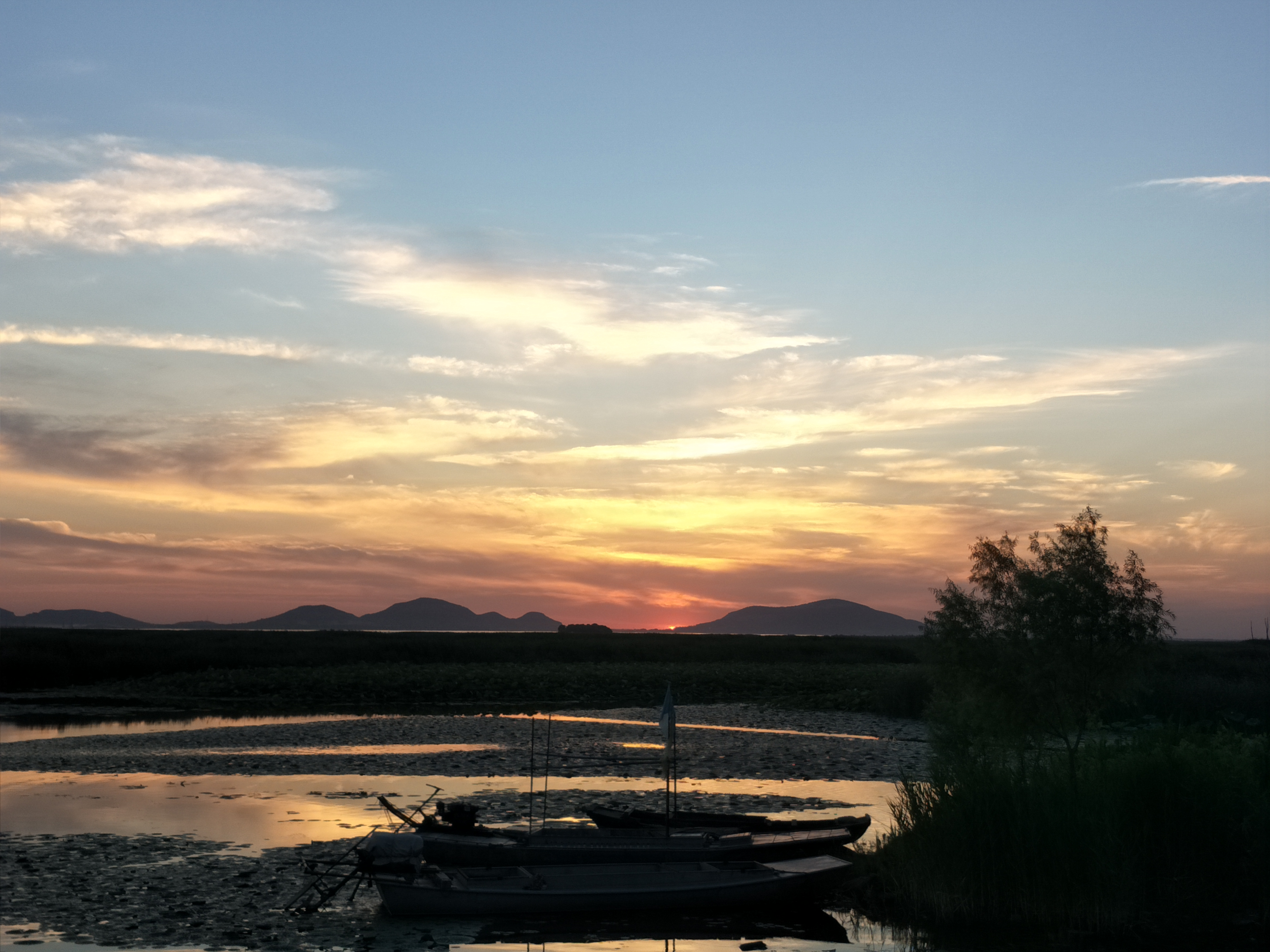
- Tai'an in front of Mount Tai Mount Tai Dawenkou Shandong Agricultural University Dongping Lake

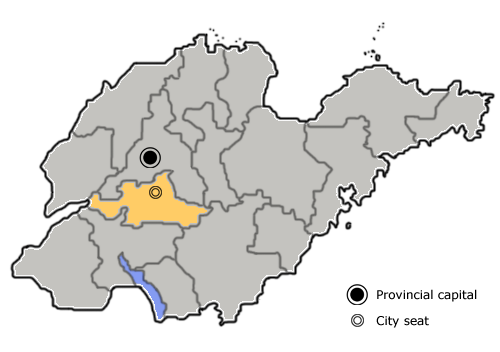
- Location of Tai'an City jurisdiction in Shandong

- Location on the North China Plain Tai'an (China)
- Coordinates (Tai'an municipal government): 36°12′07″N 117°05′13″E
- Country: People's Republic of China
- Province: Shandong
- County-level divisions: 6
- Municipal seat: Taishan District

Government
  - CPC Secretary: Cui Honggang
  - Mayor: Li Xixin

Area
  - Prefecture-level city: 7,762 km^{2} (2,997 sq mi)
  - Urban: 2,086.8 km^{2} (805.7 sq mi)
  - Metro: 2,086.8 km^{2} (805.7 sq mi)
- Elevation: 167 m (548 ft)
- Highest elevation (Mount Tai): 1,645 m (5,397 ft)

Population (2019 census)
  - Prefecture-level city: 5,635,000
  - Density: 726.0/km^{2} (1,880/sq mi)
  - Urban: 1,735,425
  - Urban density: 831.62/km^{2} (2,153.9/sq mi)
  - Metro: 1,735,425
  - Metro density: 831.62/km^{2} (2,153.9/sq mi)

GDP
  - Prefecture-level city: CN¥ 365 billion US$ 55.2 billion
  - Per capita: CN¥ 64,714; US$ 9,779
- Time zone: UTC+8 (China Standard)
- Postal code: 271000
- Area code: 538
- ISO 3166 code: CN-SD-09
- License Plate Prefix: 鲁J
- Website: www.taian.gov.cn

Tai'an (Chinese: 泰安; pinyin: Tài'ān) is a prefecture-level city in Western Shandong Province of the People's Republic of China. Centered on Mount Tai, the city borders the provincial capital of Jinan to the north, Zibo to the east, Linyi to the southeast, Liaocheng to the extreme west and Jining to the south. To the west, Tai'an is separated from the province of Henan by the Yellow River.

Its population was 5,494,207 as of the 2010 census, of whom 1,735,425 lived in the built-up (or metro) area made of two urban districts (Taishan District and Daiyue District).

== Administration ==
The prefecture-level city of Tai'an administers six county-level divisions, including two districts, two county-level cities and two counties.

- Taishan District (泰山区)
- Daiyue District (岱岳区)
- Xintai City (新泰市)
- Feicheng City (肥城市)
- Ningyang County (宁阳县)
- Dongping County (东平县)

Map
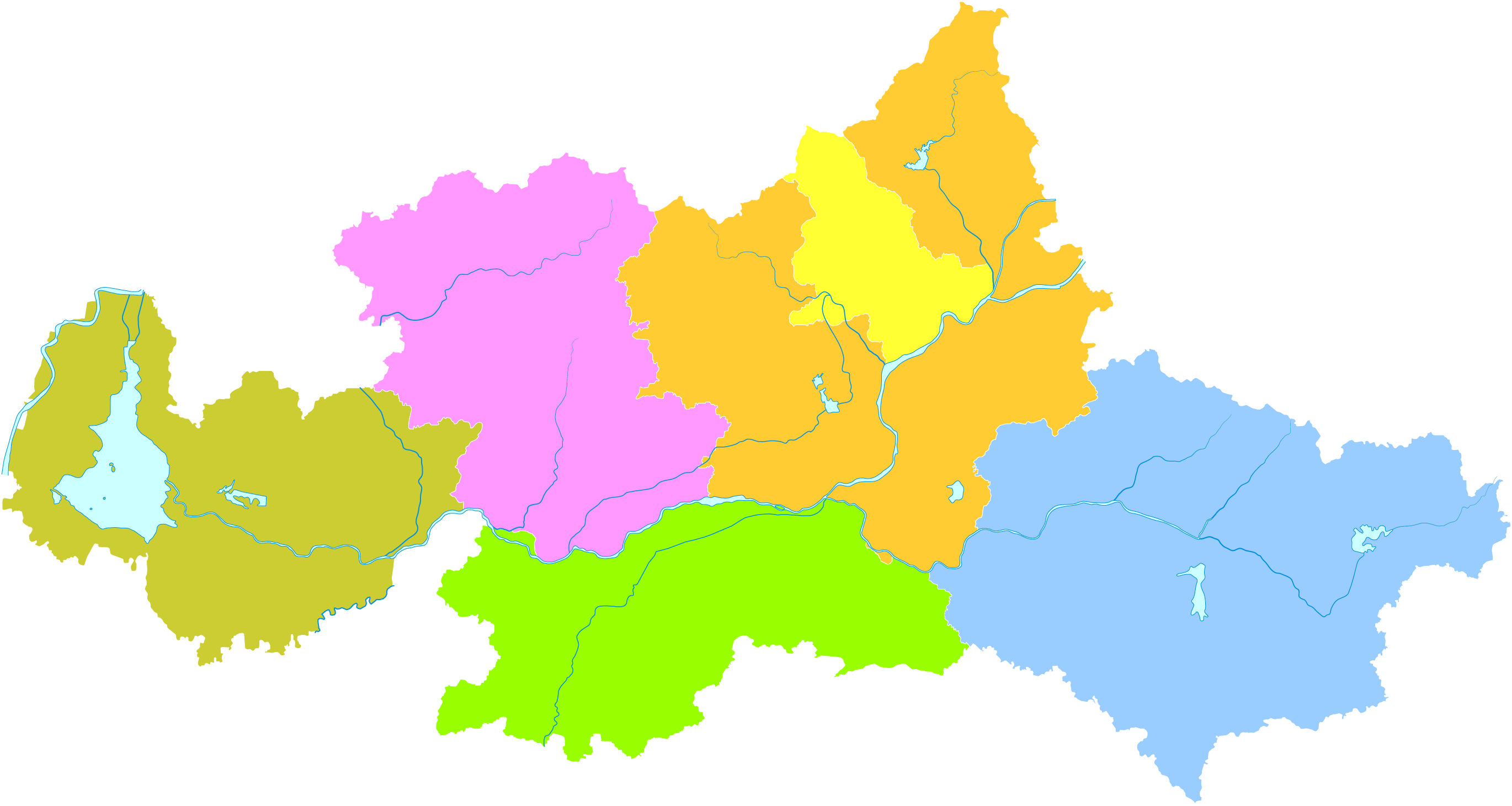

== History ==
=== Etymology ===
Tai'an is named after Mount Tai. In Chinese, Tai (泰) means "significant". Thus, the name Tai'an is derived from the ancient saying: "If Mount Tai is stable (安; ān), then the four seas (the world) are safe."

=== Early history ===
Tai'an was home to the Dawenkou culture during the Neolithic era. During the Spring and Autumn period and the Warring States period, the region belonged to the states of Qi and Lu. The site of major historical and cultural significance in the area is Mount Tai. It attracted multiple emperors throughout the dynasties to visit, offer sacrifice to the heaven gods and pray for harvest. Confucius, Sima Qian, Cao Zhi, Li Bai, Du Fu and other litterateurs visited here and many great works were produced. Taoist temples such as Dai Temple were built here and became pilgrimage sites.

=== Modern history ===
In 1909, German colonials built Tai'an-Fu Railway Station along with the construction of Tianjin–Pukou railway (Tientsin–Pukow railway). On 10 November of the following year, the first train service passed through the station.

On 1 May 1928, Chiang Kai-shek, the leader of KMT and nationalist revolutionary army, commanded the attack of Tai'an and occupied it the next day.

In October 1937, exiled students from Peking, Tianjin and other major cities arrived in Tai'an seeking asylum after the north of Yellow river was occupied by the Japanese forces. On 24 December 1937, Japanese troops crossed the Yellow River, occupied Jinan on the next day, and bombed Tai'an. On the night of 31 December, the Japanese occupied Tai'an. Local resistants were assembled autonomously to fight against the occupation.

== Culture ==
Tai'an holds significant historical and cultural importance due to its association with Mount Tai, which is recognized as a UNESCO World Heritage Site. Worship at Mount Tai began in prehistoric times where the religious Confucianism ritual Feng Shan would be performed by the kings of Zhou and later emperors of China. While the last traditional Feng Shan was performed in 1790, Tai'an holds an annual large-scale live performance called "Chinese Taishan·Fengshan Grand Ceremony".

Tai'an is a tourist city, and the Tai'an government has also been trying to promote the development of tourism in Tai'an.

== Geography ==
Tai'an is centered on the south side of Mount Tai. Dongping Lake is the biggest lake.

=== Climate ===
Tai'an lies in the northern temperate zone and has a continental, semi-humid monsoon climate. The average annual temperatures are −2.1 °C (28.2 °F) (January), 12.8 °C (55.0 °F) (annual average), and 26.0 °C (78.8 °F) (July). The average annual precipitation is 681 mm (26.8 in).

Climate data for Tai'an, elevation 129 m (423 ft), (1991–2020 normals, extremes 1971–2010)
Month	Jan	Feb	Mar	Apr	May	Jun	Jul	Aug	Sep	Oct	Nov	Dec	Year
Record high °C (°F)	15.8 (60.4)	21.8 (71.2)	26.1 (79.0)	33.8 (92.8)	38.6 (101.5)	40.7 (105.3)	39.6 (103.3)	40.0 (104.0)	34.6 (94.3)	31.6 (88.9)	27.1 (80.8)	17.4 (63.3)	40.7 (105.3)
Mean daily maximum °C (°F)	4.6 (40.3)	8.2 (46.8)	14.4 (57.9)	21.1 (70.0)	26.6 (79.9)	31.0 (87.8)	31.4 (88.5)	30.3 (86.5)	26.9 (80.4)	21.0 (69.8)	13.0 (55.4)	6.1 (43.0)	19.6 (67.2)
Daily mean °C (°F)	−1.3 (29.7)	2.1 (35.8)	8.2 (46.8)	14.9 (58.8)	20.5 (68.9)	25.1 (77.2)	26.7 (80.1)	25.5 (77.9)	20.9 (69.6)	14.4 (57.9)	6.9 (44.4)	0.5 (32.9)	13.7 (56.7)
Mean daily minimum °C (°F)	−5.9 (21.4)	−2.9 (26.8)	2.6 (36.7)	8.9 (48.0)	14.4 (57.9)	19.5 (67.1)	22.7 (72.9)	21.6 (70.9)	15.9 (60.6)	9.1 (48.4)	2.0 (35.6)	−3.9 (25.0)	8.7 (47.6)
Record low °C (°F)	−22.4 (−8.3)	−19.3 (−2.7)	−12.6 (9.3)	−5.7 (21.7)	0.7 (33.3)	8.2 (46.8)	13.1 (55.6)	10.4 (50.7)	1.8 (35.2)	−3.3 (26.1)	−12.6 (9.3)	−20.3 (−4.5)	−22.4 (−8.3)
Average precipitation mm (inches)	5.2 (0.20)	11.9 (0.47)	13.8 (0.54)	33.4 (1.31)	55.8 (2.20)	85.2 (3.35)	201.3 (7.93)	160.3 (6.31)	64.2 (2.53)	27.7 (1.09)	25.3 (1.00)	7.6 (0.30)	691.7 (27.23)
Average precipitation days (≥ 0.1 mm)	2.1	3.3	3.3	5.1	6.9	8.5	12.4	11.6	7.3	5.5	4.4	3.1	73.5
Average snowy days	2.8	2.9	1.2	0.2	0	0	0	0	0	0	1.0	2.2	10.3
Average relative humidity (%)	58	55	51	56	61	62	78	80	74	69	66	62	64
Mean monthly sunshine hours	163.6	166.4	213.5	235.3	261.5	228.5	190.8	200.2	194.6	198.7	170.6	162.1	2,385.8
Percentage possible sunshine	53	54	57	60	60	52	43	48	53	58	56	54	54
Source 1: China Meteorological Administration
Source 2: Weather China

== Education ==
- Shandong University of Science and Technology
- Shandong First Medical University
- Shandong Agricultural University
- Taishan University
- Tai'an Public Health School
- Tai'an Polytechnic College
- Shandong Foreign Trade Vocational College Taian Campus

Secondary schools

- Tai'an No.1 High School (泰安一中)

== Transportation ==
Tai'an is served by Tai'an railway station on the Beijing–Shanghai high-speed railway and Taishan railway station on the Beijing–Shanghai railway.

Tai'an is served by the G2 Beijing–Shanghai Expressway and on the Tai-Lai Expressway (west-east from Tai'an to Laiwu). There is a four-lane highway from Tai'an to the Jinan Yaoqiang International Airport. Within Tai'an there are large tree lined avenues throughout the city.

The nearest major airport is Jinan Yaoqiang International Airport, about 120 km (75 mi) to the north.

== See also ==
- List of twin towns and sister cities in China
