= Tai'an railway station (Shandong) =

Railway station in Tai'an, Shandong, China

Tai'an 泰安
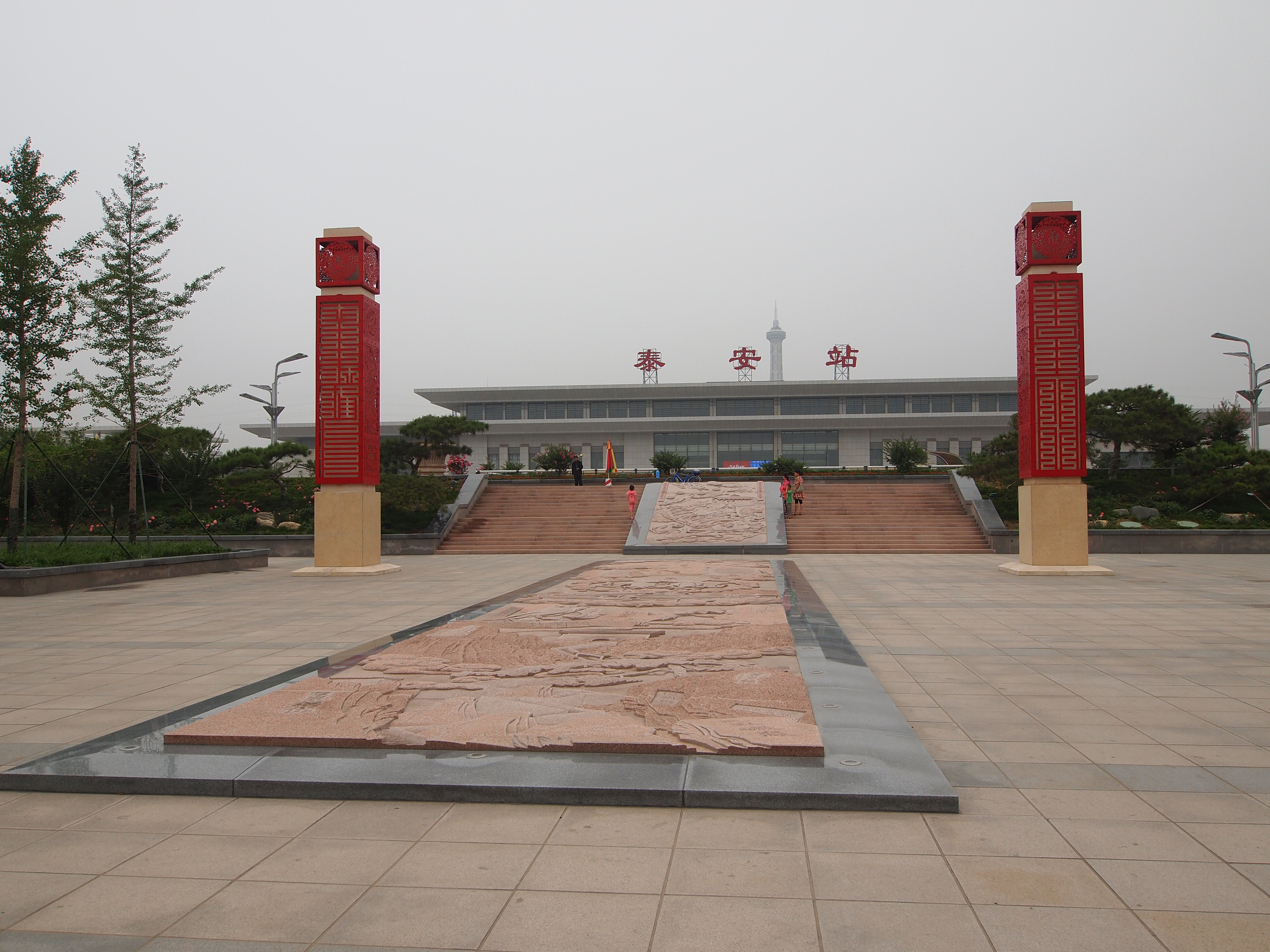
- Station building in 2012

General information
- Location: Daiyue District, Tai'an, Shandong; China
- Coordinates: 36.171867°N 117.028728°E
- Operated by: Jinan Railway Bureau; China Railway Corporation
- Line: Jinghu High-Speed Railway

Other information
- Station code: 66815 (TMIS code); TMK (telegram code); TAN (pinyin code)

History
- Opened: June 30, 2011
Location

The Tai'an railway station (Chinese: 泰安站) is a high-speed railway station in Daiyue District, Tai'an, Shandong, People's Republic of China. It is served by the Jinghu High-Speed Railway.

Preceding station	China Railway High-speed	Following station
Jinan West towards Beijing South or Tianjin West	Beijing–Shanghai high-speed railway Part of the Beijing–Taipei High-Speed Rail Corridor	Qufu East towards Shanghai Hongqiao
