= Yanzhuang, Jinan =

Yanzhuang 颜庄镇
- Town
- Location in Shandong Yanzhuang (China)
- Coordinates: 36°07′15″N 117°46′05″E
- Country: People's Republic of China
- Province: Shandong
- Prefecture-level city: Jinan
- District: Gangcheng
- Time zone: UTC+8 (China Standard)

Yanzhuang (Chinese: 颜庄镇) is a town in Gangcheng District, Jinan, in central Shandong province, China.
