= Laiwu =

Former prefecture-level city in Shandong, China

Laiwu 莱芜市
- Prefecture-level city of China
- 1992–2019
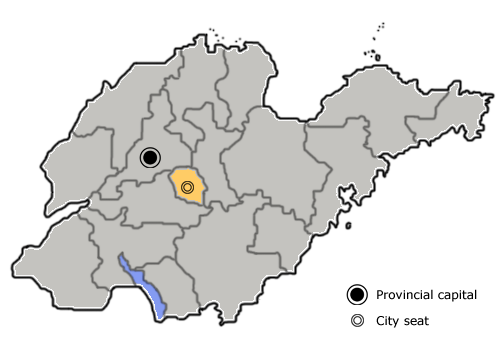
- Area
- 2,246.21 km^{2} (867.27 sq mi)
- History
  - Established: 1992
  - Disestablished: 2019
Succeeded by
Gangcheng District; Laiwu District
- Today part of: Jinan, Shandong

Laiwu
- Traditional Chinese: 萊蕪
- Simplified Chinese: 莱芜
- Postal: Laiwu
Transcriptions
Standard Mandarin
- Hanyu Pinyin: Láiwú
- Bopomofo: ㄌㄞˊ ㄨˊ
- Wade–Giles: Lai^{2}-wu^{2}
- IPA: [lǎɪ.ǔ]

Laiwu (simplified Chinese: 莱芜; traditional Chinese: 萊蕪; pinyin: Láiwú) was a prefecture-level city in central Shandong Province, China. Bordered the provincial capital of Jinan to the north, Zibo to the east and Tai'an to the southwest, it was the smallest prefecture-level city in the province. It had a population of 1,298,529 as of the 2010 census, all living in the built-up (or metro) area made of 2 urban Districts and became part of Jinan in 2019 and 907,839 living in urban area.

== Administration ==
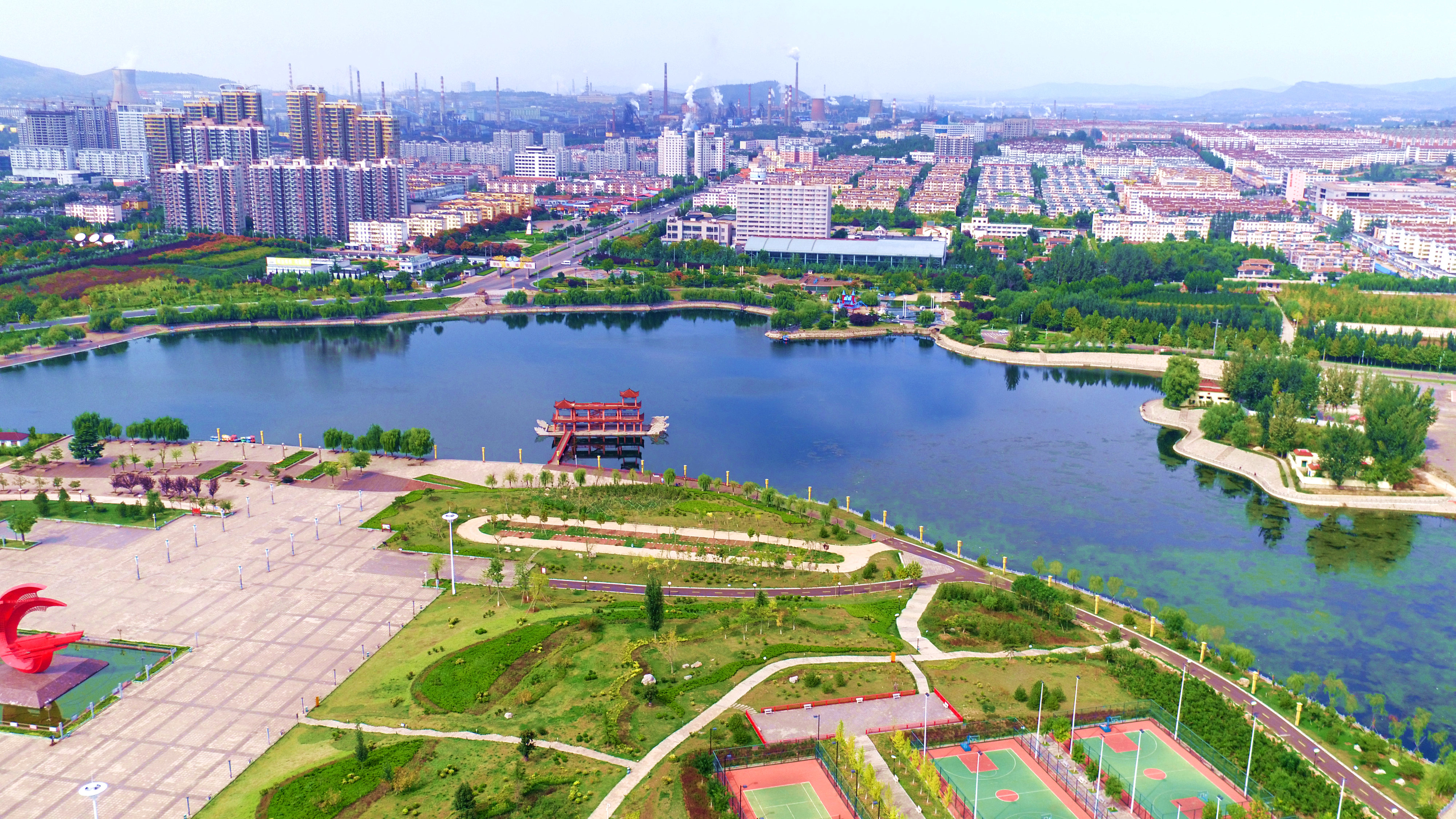
Gangcheng, Laiwu

The prefecture-level city of Laiwu administered two county-level divisions, both of which were districts.

- Laicheng District (莱城区; 萊城區)
- Gangcheng District (钢城区; 鋼城區)

They were further divided into 19 township-level divisions, including 14 towns, one townships and four subdistricts.

Since 1 January 2019, Laiwu was merged into Jinan which is the capital city of Shandong province and is no longer a prefecture-level city.

Map
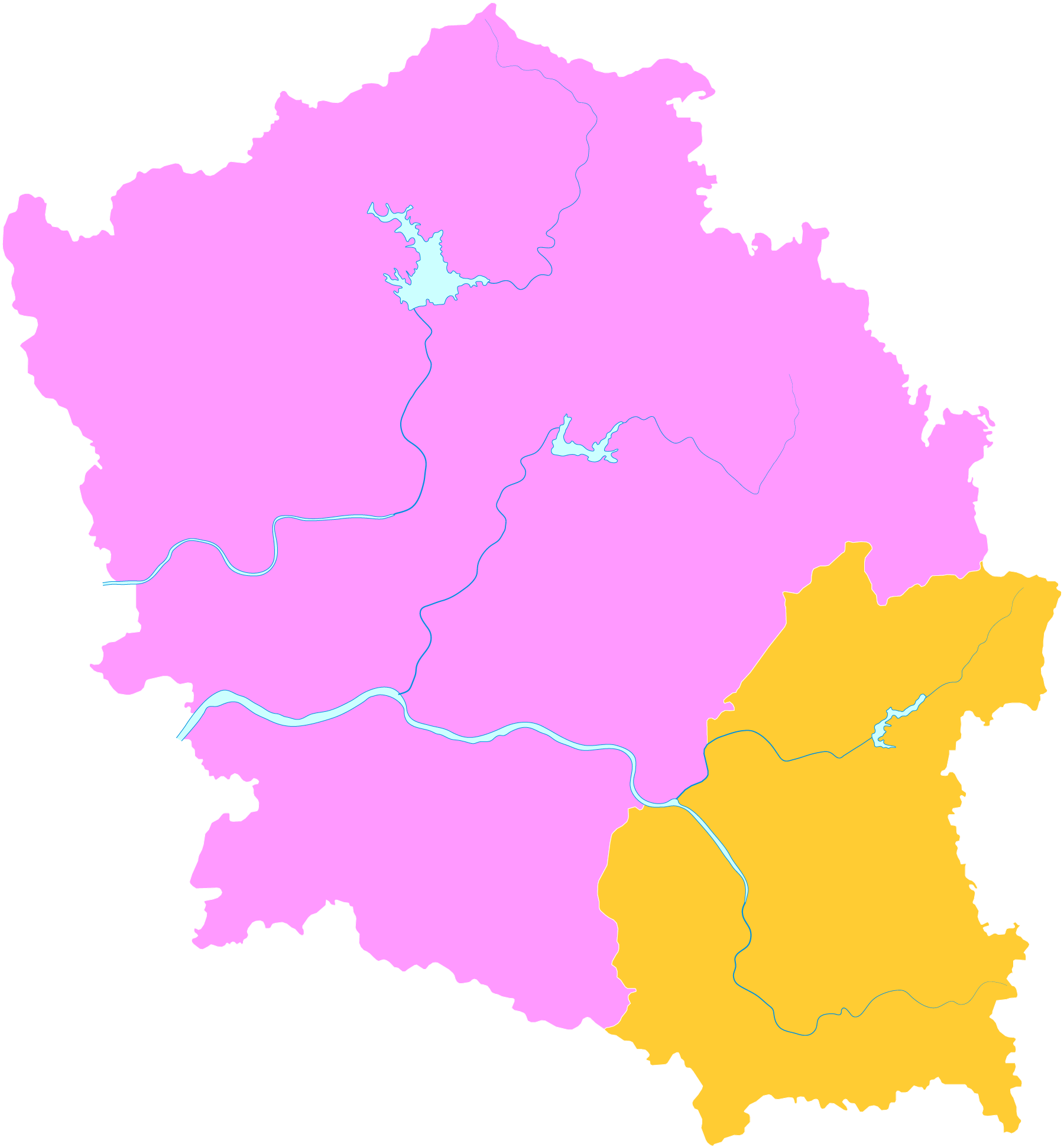
