= Laiwu, Jinan =

Coordinates: 36°09′01″N 117°35′37″E

Laiwu 莱芜区
- District
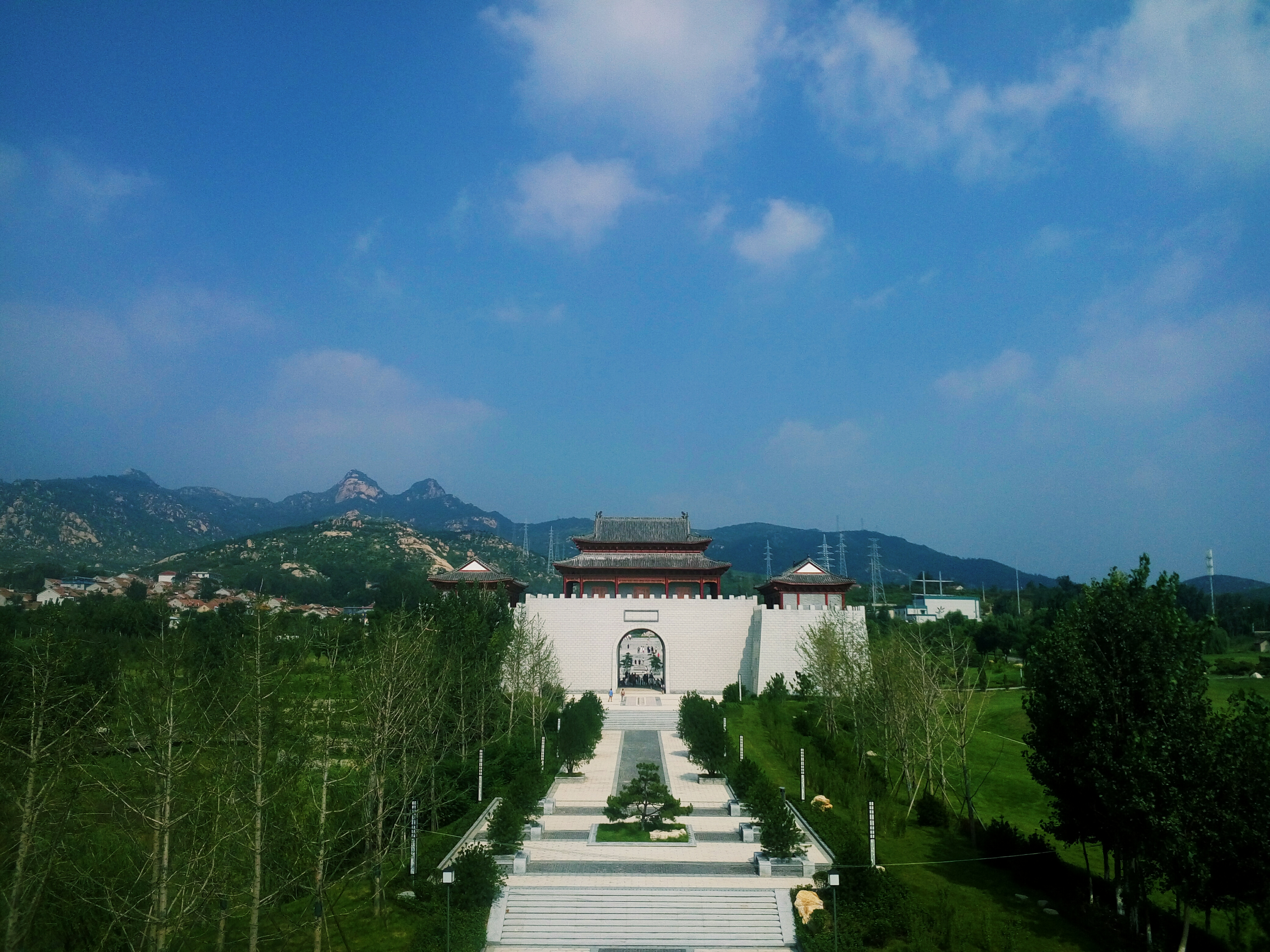
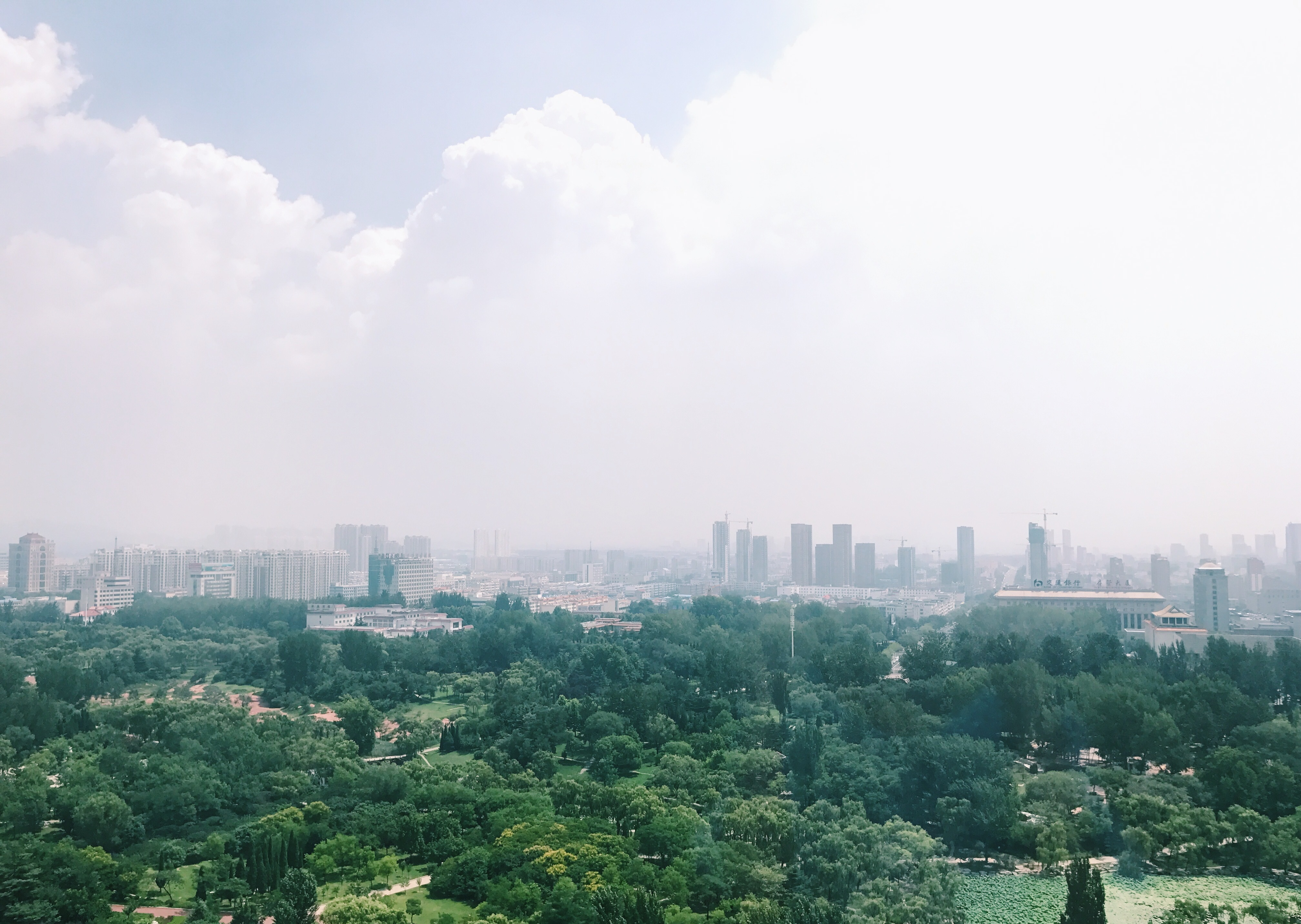
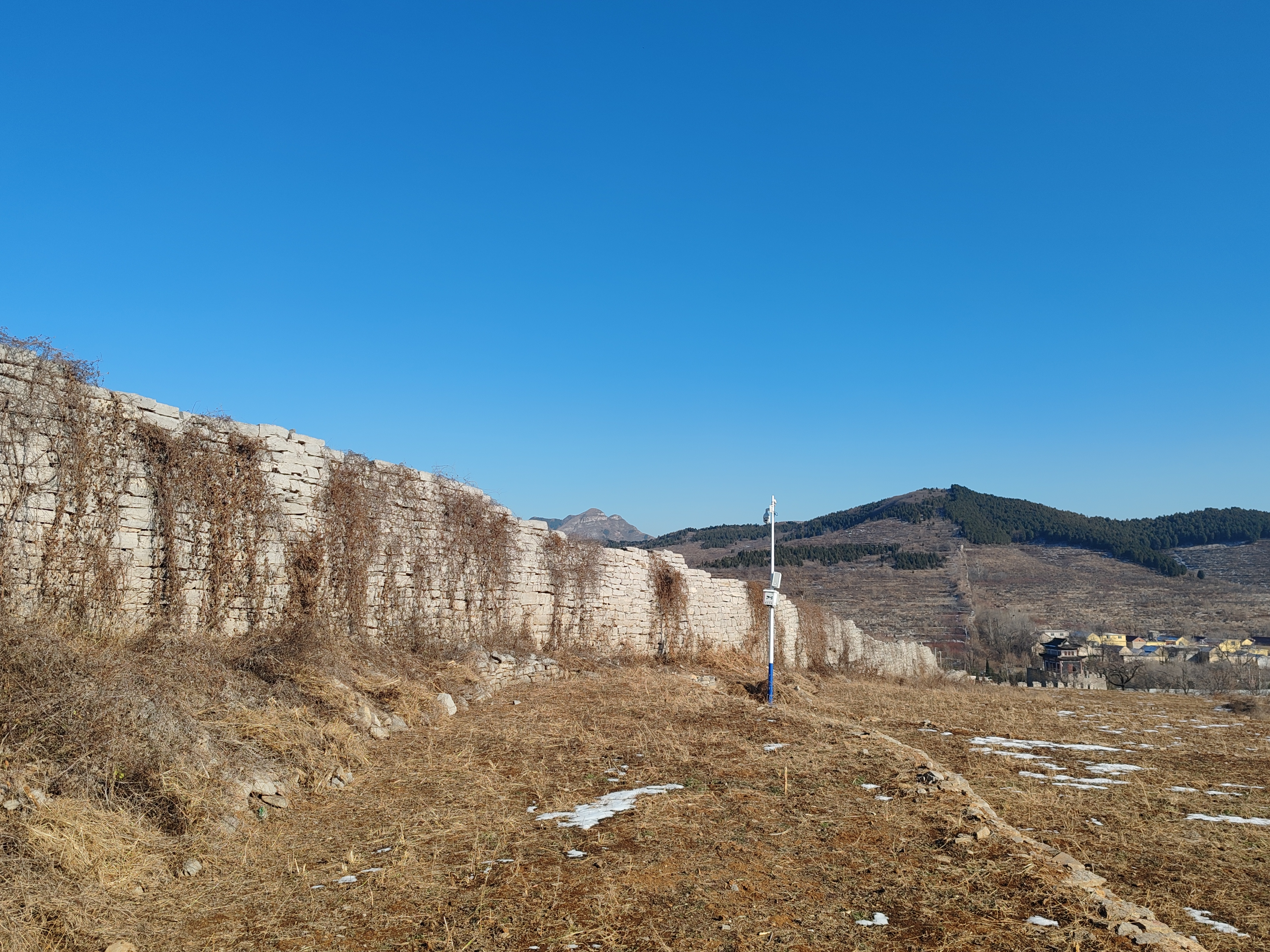
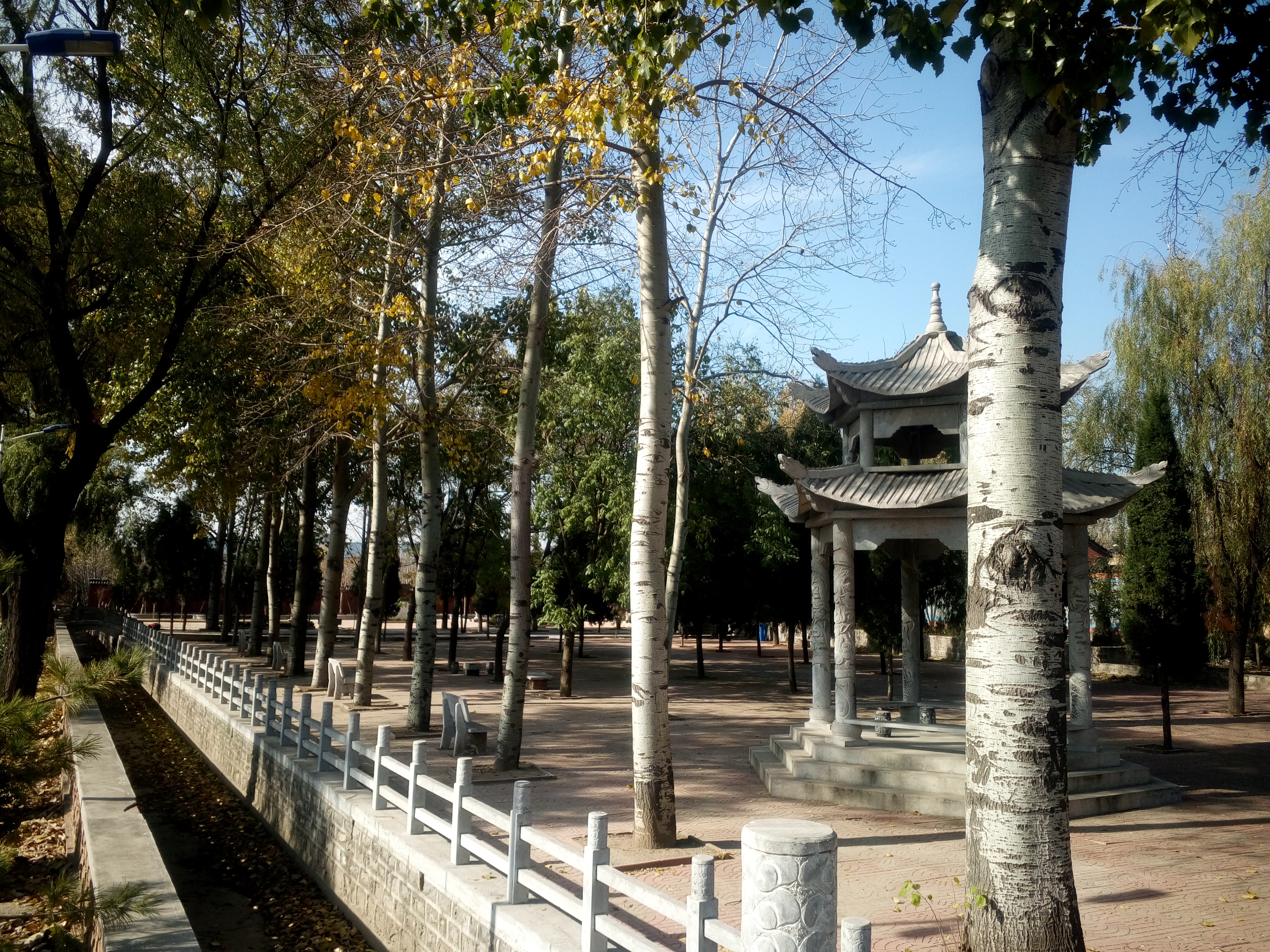
- Lake Xueye Downtown Laiwu Qi Great Wall in Laiwu Archaeological Site of Wenyang

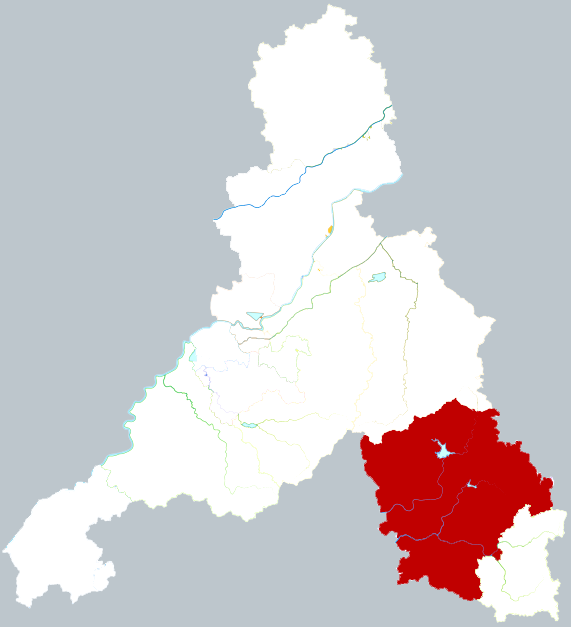
- Location in the city of Jinan

- Jinan city in Shandong
- Country: People's Republic of China
- Province: Shandong
- Prefecture-level city: Jinan

Area
  - District: 1,909.89 km^{2} (737.41 sq mi)
  - Metro: 2,246.43 km^{2} (867.35 sq mi)

Population (2010 census)
  - District: 989,535
  - Density: 518.111/km^{2} (1,341.90/sq mi)
  - Metro: 1,298,529
  - Metro density: 578.041/km^{2} (1,497.12/sq mi)
- Time zone: UTC+8 (China Standard)
- Postal code: 271100
- Area code: +86 0634
- Website: www.laiwu.gov.cn

Laiwu District (simplified Chinese: 莱芜区; traditional Chinese: 萊蕪區; pinyin: Láiwú Qū) is one of 10 urban districts of the prefecture-level city of Jinan, the capital of Shandong Province, East China.

It has an area of 1,906.89 km^{2} (736.25 sq mi) and 989,535 inhabitants as of 2010 census. Nevertheless, its built-up area made of Laiwu District and Gangcheng District (the previous Laiwu city) was home to 1,298,529 inhabitants.

In January 2019, the Shandong provincial government announced in a decision that Laiwu Prefecture-level City was absorbed by Jinan. Laicheng District was renamed to Laiwu District under Jinan's administration.

== Administrative divisions ==
As of 2012, Laicheng District is divided to 4 subdistricts, 10 towns and 1 townships.

Subdistricts

- Fengcheng Subdistrict (凤城街道)
- Zhangjiawa Subdistrict (张家洼街道)
- Gaozhuang Subdistrict (高庄街道)
- Pengquan Subdistrict (鹏泉街道)
- Kouzhen Subdistrict (口镇街道)

Towns

- Yangli (羊里镇)
- Fangxia (方下镇)
- Niuquan (牛泉镇)
- Miaoshan (苗山镇)
- Xueye (雪野镇)
- Dawangzhuang (大王庄镇)
- Zhaili (寨里镇)
- Yangzhuang (杨庄镇)
- Chayekou (茶业口镇)

Townships

- Hezhuang Township (和庄乡)

== Climate ==
Climate data for Laiwu District, elevation 229 m (751 ft), (1991–2020 normals, extremes 1981–2010)
Month	Jan	Feb	Mar	Apr	May	Jun	Jul	Aug	Sep	Oct	Nov	Dec	Year
Record high °C (°F)	17.3 (63.1)	21.1 (70.0)	28.5 (83.3)	32.9 (91.2)	36.2 (97.2)	38.7 (101.7)	39.9 (103.8)	36.6 (97.9)	35.7 (96.3)	33.9 (93.0)	25.0 (77.0)	18.5 (65.3)	39.9 (103.8)
Mean daily maximum °C (°F)	3.9 (39.0)	7.5 (45.5)	13.8 (56.8)	21.0 (69.8)	26.6 (79.9)	30.5 (86.9)	31.2 (88.2)	30.0 (86.0)	26.3 (79.3)	20.4 (68.7)	12.4 (54.3)	5.5 (41.9)	19.1 (66.4)
Daily mean °C (°F)	−1.4 (29.5)	1.9 (35.4)	7.9 (46.2)	14.9 (58.8)	20.8 (69.4)	25.0 (77.0)	26.6 (79.9)	25.4 (77.7)	21.0 (69.8)	14.7 (58.5)	7.1 (44.8)	0.5 (32.9)	13.7 (56.7)
Mean daily minimum °C (°F)	−5.4 (22.3)	−2.5 (27.5)	2.8 (37.0)	9.4 (48.9)	15.2 (59.4)	19.8 (67.6)	22.7 (72.9)	21.6 (70.9)	16.6 (61.9)	10.0 (50.0)	2.9 (37.2)	−3.3 (26.1)	9.2 (48.5)
Record low °C (°F)	−19.3 (−2.7)	−17.0 (1.4)	−10.3 (13.5)	−3.8 (25.2)	2.4 (36.3)	9.6 (49.3)	12.7 (54.9)	12.0 (53.6)	6.3 (43.3)	−3.6 (25.5)	−12.4 (9.7)	−18.0 (−0.4)	−19.3 (−2.7)
Average precipitation mm (inches)	5.6 (0.22)	11.8 (0.46)	13.1 (0.52)	30.2 (1.19)	54.5 (2.15)	94.3 (3.71)	190.3 (7.49)	183.9 (7.24)	69.1 (2.72)	28.1 (1.11)	25.2 (0.99)	8.5 (0.33)	714.6 (28.13)
Average precipitation days (≥ 0.1 mm)	2.5	3.5	3.6	5.6	6.8	8.3	12.7	12.5	7.4	5.7	4.5	3.4	76.5
Average snowy days	4.0	3.1	1.7	0.3	0	0	0	0	0	0	1.2	2.6	12.9
Average relative humidity (%)	56	53	49	50	54	59	74	76	69	63	62	59	60
Mean monthly sunshine hours	158.4	159.8	207.1	228.0	250.7	212.5	175.7	180.5	184.3	189.6	161.7	158.4	2,266.7
Percentage possible sunshine	51	52	56	58	57	49	40	44	50	55	53	53	52
Source: China Meteorological Administration

== Notable villages ==
- Beishanyang
