= Daiyue, Tai'an =

Daiyue 岱岳区
- District
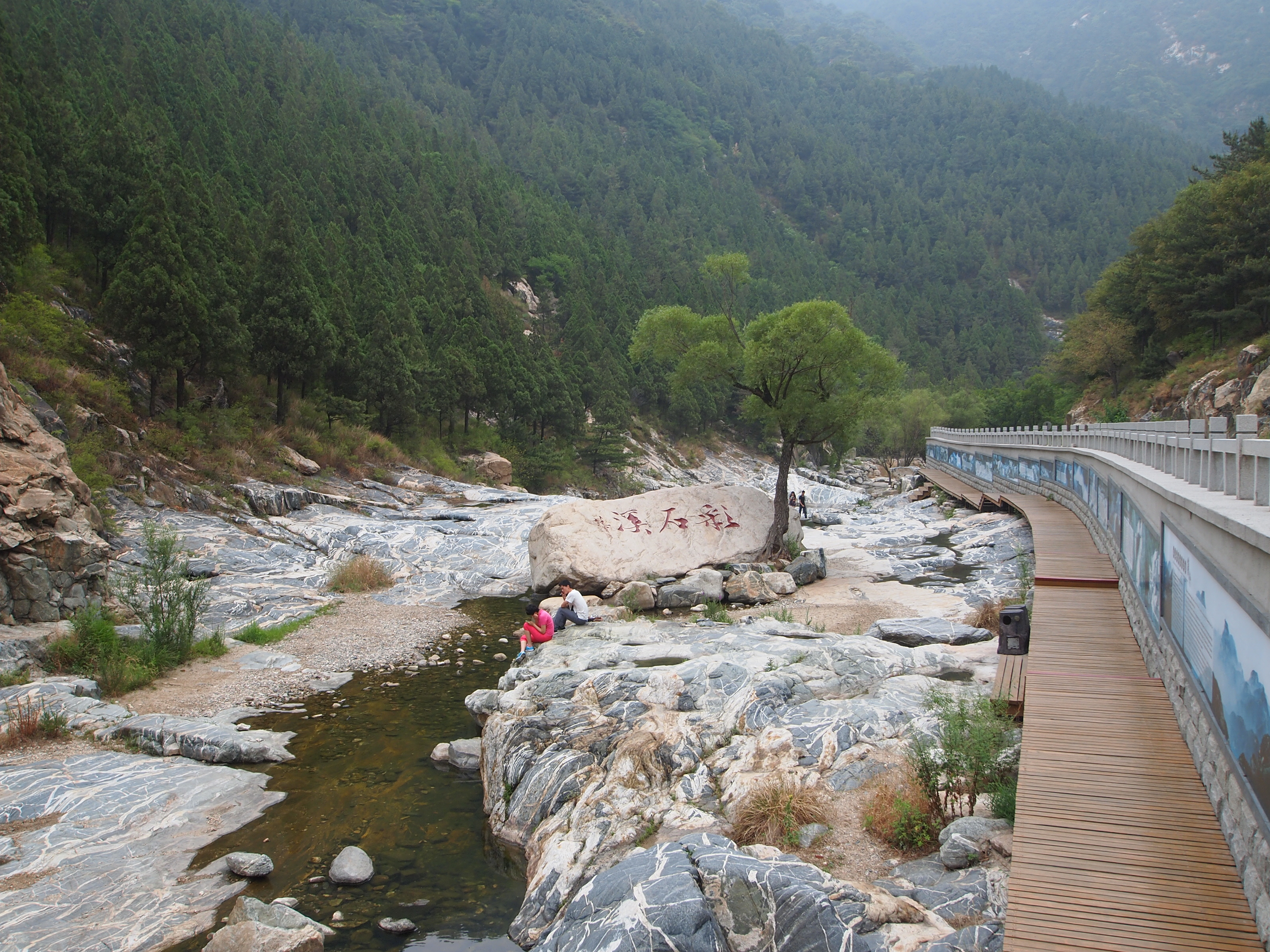
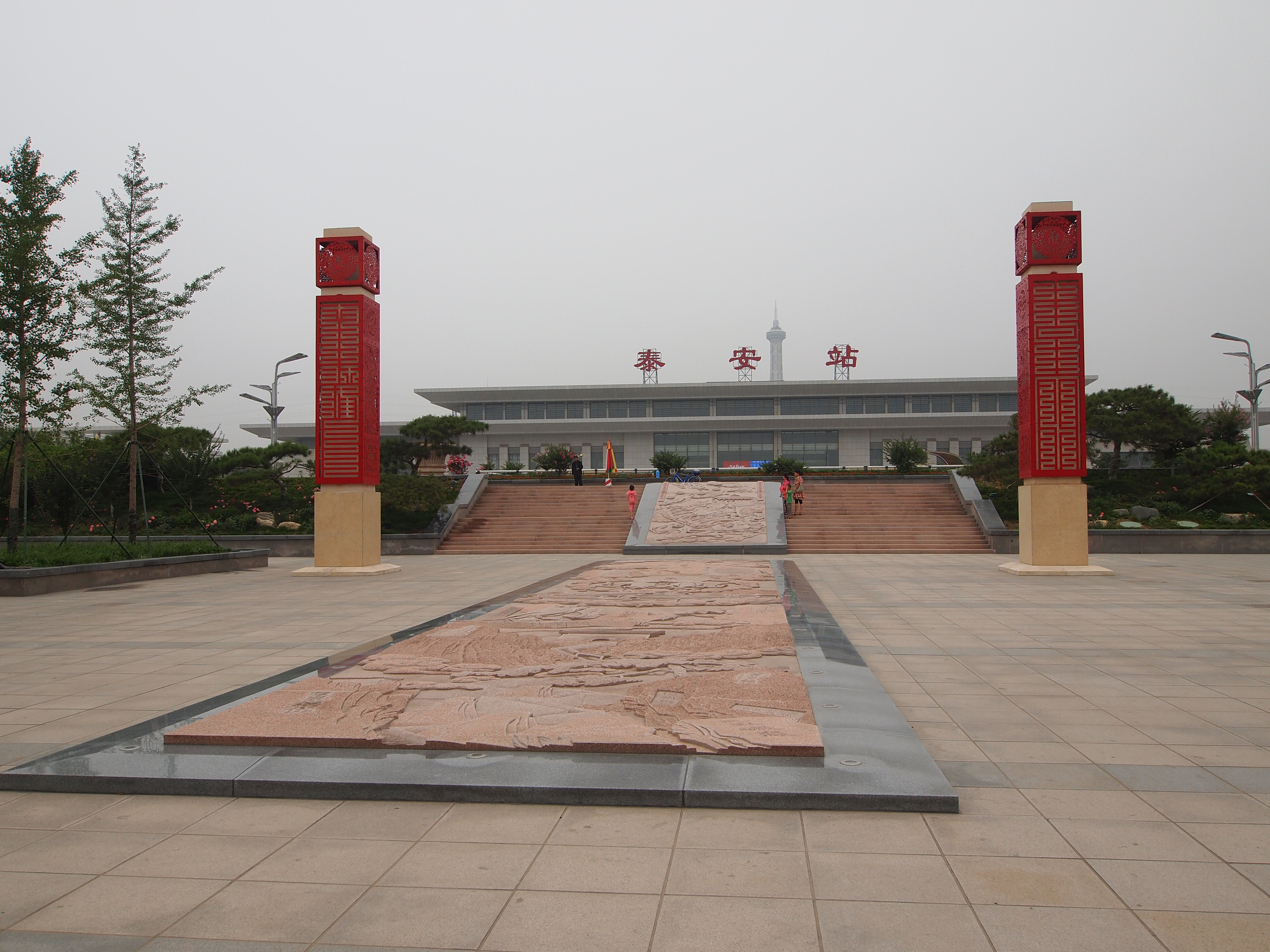
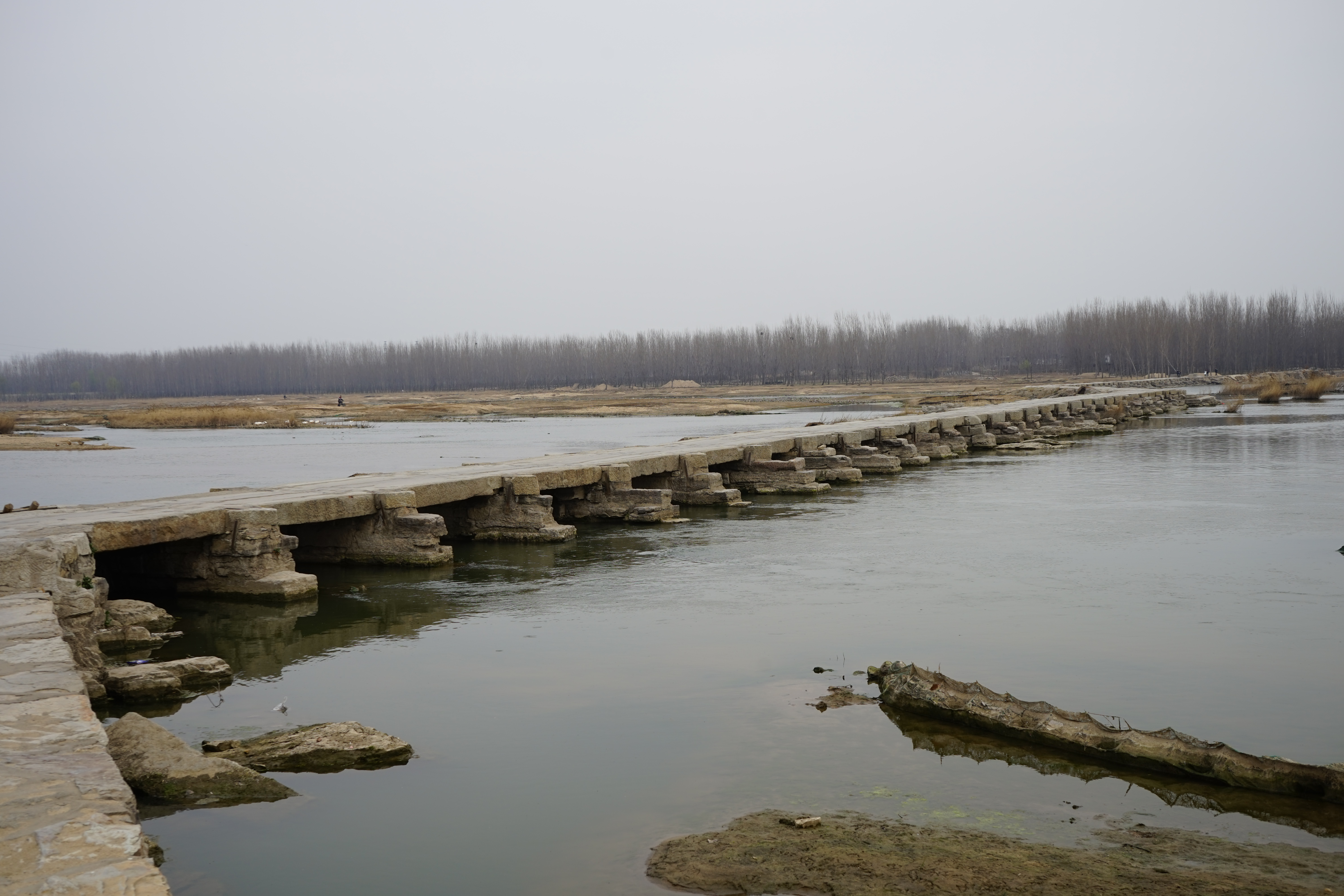
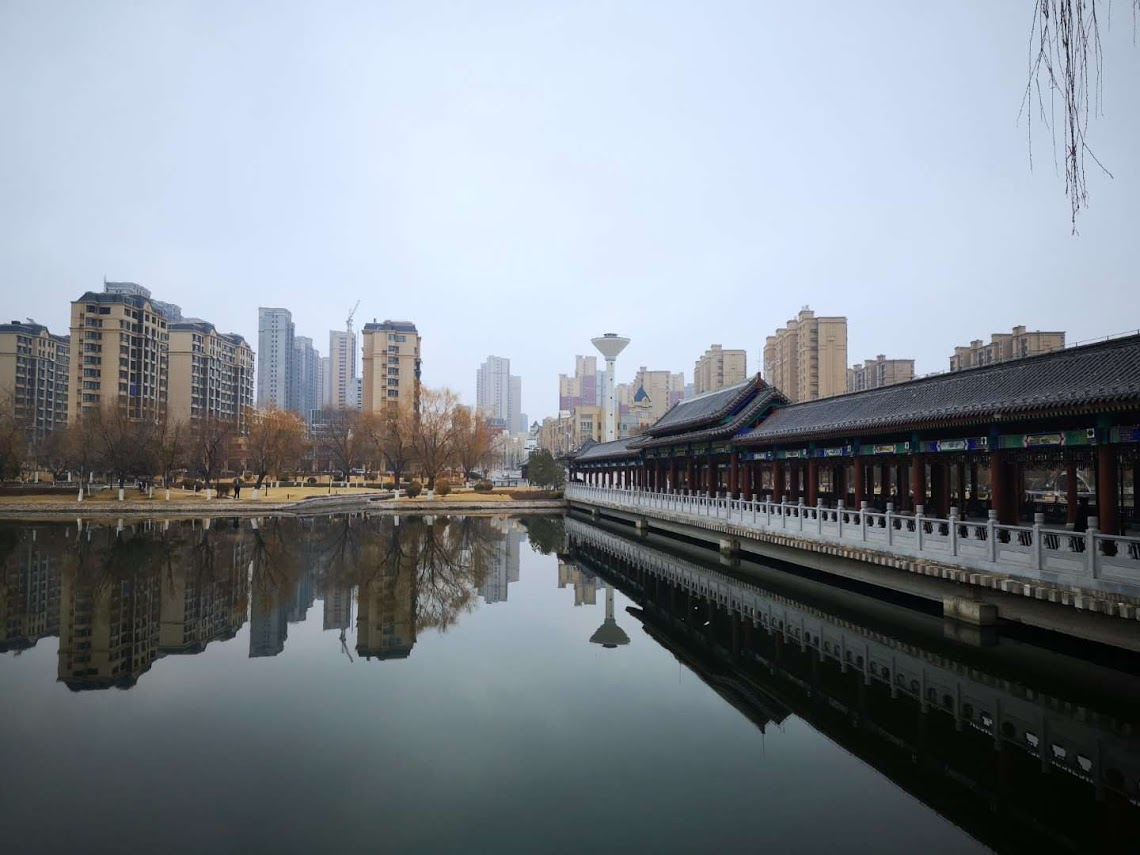
- Taohua Valley Tai'an railway station Dawenkou Ancient Stone Bridge Dahe Wetland

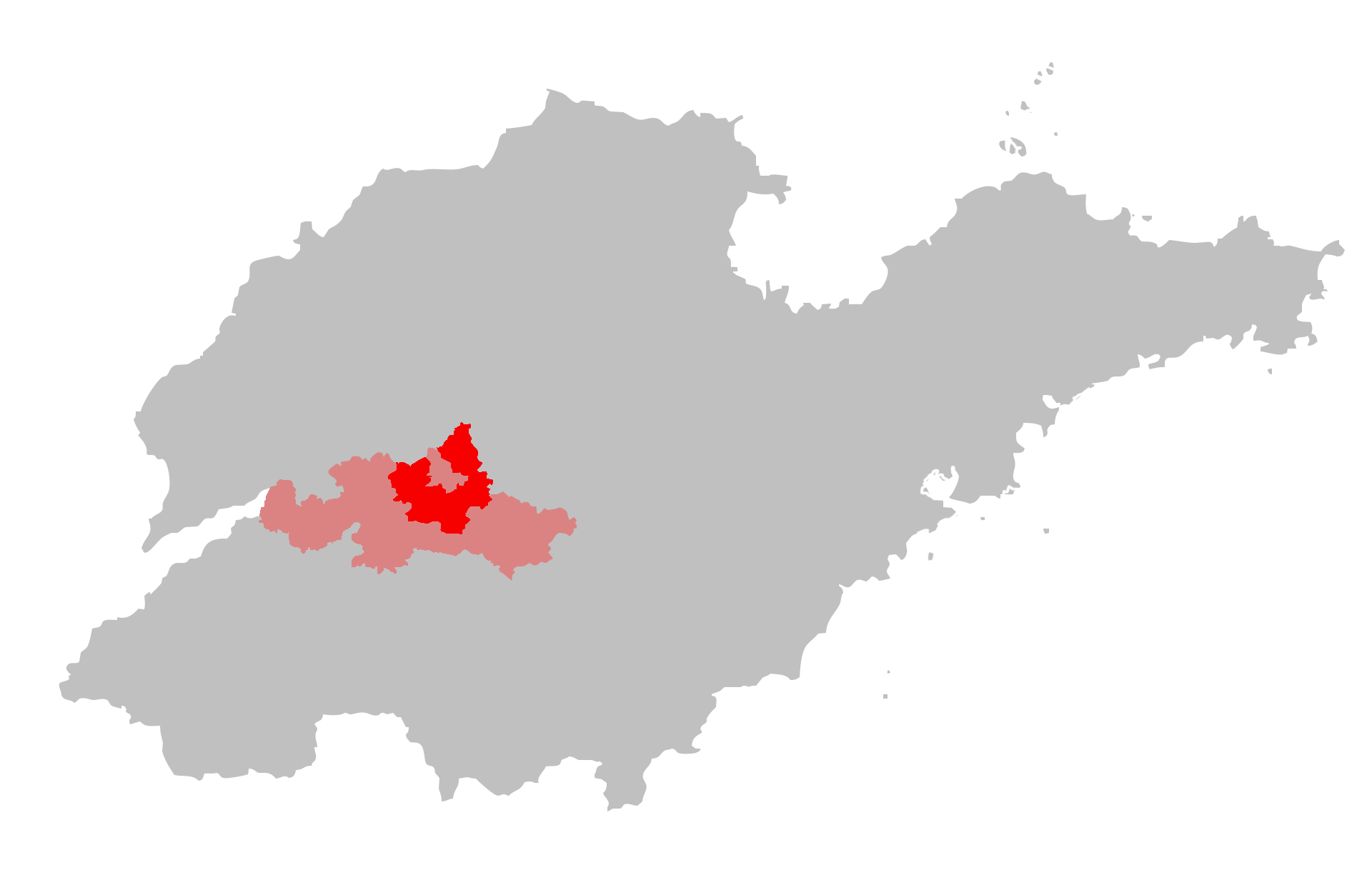
- Location in Shandong

- Location in Shandong
- Coordinates: 36°11′32″N 117°02′29″E
- Country: China
- Province: Shandong
- Prefecture-level city: Tai'an

Area
  - Total: 1,750 km^{2} (680 sq mi)

Population (2019)
  - Total: 609,500
  - Density: 348/km^{2} (902/sq mi)
- Time zone: UTC+8 (China Standard)
- Postal code: 271000
- Website: www.daiyue.gov.cn

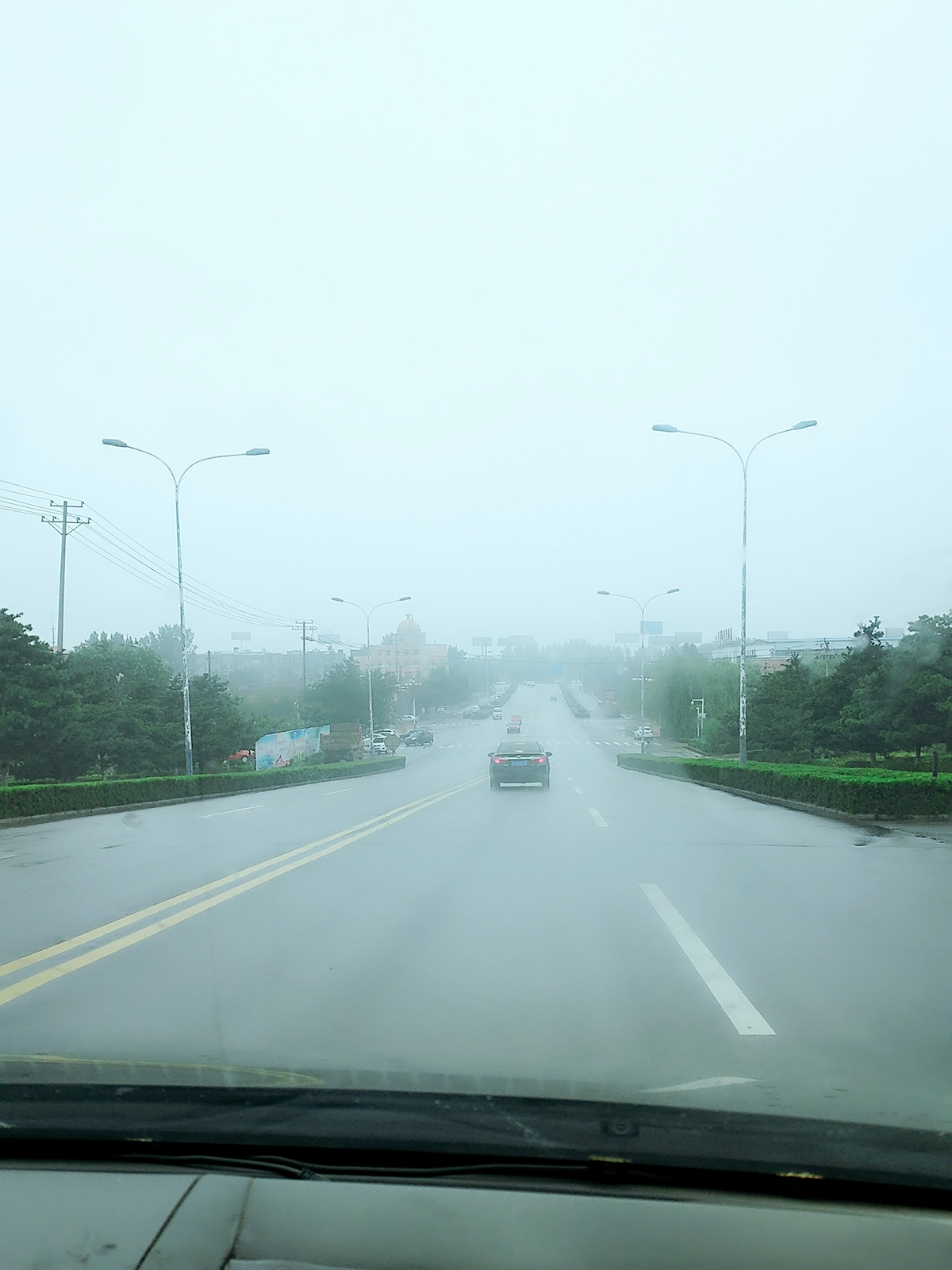
A road in Daiyue District

Daiyue (Chinese: 岱岳; pinyin: Dàiyuè) is a district of the city of Tai'an in Shandong province, China.

== Administrative divisions ==
As of 2012, this district is divided to 2 subdistricts, 14 towns and 2 townships.

Subdistricts

- Zhoudian Subdistrict (粥店街道)
- Tianping Subdistrict (天平街道)

Towns

- Shankou (山口镇)
- Zhuyang (祝阳镇)
- Fan (范镇)
- Jiaoyu (角峪镇)
- Culai (徂徕镇)
- Beijipo (北集坡镇)
- Manzhuang (满庄镇)
- Xiazhang (夏张镇)
- Daolang (道朗镇)
- Huangqian (黄前镇)
- Dawenkou (大汶口镇)
- Mazhuang (马庄镇)
- Fangcun (房村镇)
- Liangzhuang (良庄镇)

Townships

- Xiagang Township (下港乡)
- Huamawan Township (化马湾乡)
