= Miaoshan, Jinan =

Miaoshan 苗山镇
- Town
- Location in Shandong Miaoshan (China)
- Coordinates: 36°18′58″N 117°47′39″E
- Country: People's Republic of China
- Province: Shandong
- Prefecture-level city: Jinan
- District: Laiwu District
- Time zone: UTC+8 (China Standard)

Miaoshan (Chinese: 苗山; pinyin: Miáoshān) is a town in Laiwu District, Jinan, Shandong province, China. As of 2020, it has 85 villages under its administration:

- Nanmiaoshan First Village (南苗山一村)
- Nanmiaoshan Second Village (南苗山二村)
- Nanmiaoshan Third Village (南苗山三村)
- Nanmiaoshan Fourth Village (南苗山四村)
- Beimiaoshan Village (北苗山村)
- Dongquan Village (东泉村)
- Niuwangquan Village (牛旺泉村)
- Shiwan Village (石湾村)
- Nanxinzhuang Village (南辛庄村)
- Beixinzhuang Village (北辛庄村)
- Nanzhujiawa Village (南祝家洼村)
- Beizhujiawa Village (北祝家洼村)
- Xiaoshanqian Village (小山前村)
- Ganqiao Village (干桥村)
- Xiaohoupo Village (小后坡村)
- Dahoupo Village (大后坡村)
- Shangguojiagou Village (上郭家沟村)
- Damanzi Village (大漫子村)
- Xiaomanzi Village (小漫子村)
- Shangzhujiadian Village (上朱家店村)
- Chenjiayu Village (陈家峪村)
- Gaoshangpo Village (高上坡村)
- Tangshangpo Village (唐上坡村)
- Zhushangpo Village (祝上坡村)
- Sushangpo Village (苏上坡村)
- Xijianma Village (西见马村)
- Lanzi Village (兰子村)
- Yangjiazui Village (杨家嘴村)
- Nanliuzi Village (南柳子村)
- Beiliuzi Village (北柳子村)
- Douyu Village (陡峪村)
- Wangjiazhuang Village (王家庄村)
- Mengjiayu Village (孟家峪村)
- Dongjianma Village (东见马村)
- Dongshaoshan Village (东杓山村)
- Xishaoshan Village (西杓山村)
- Wuseya Village (五色崖村)
- Sunjiayu Village (孙家峪村)
- Songjiayu Village (宋家峪村)
- Hengshankou Village (横山口村)
- Mandao Village (漫道村)
- Huidui Village (灰堆村)
- Beilongjiao Village (北龙角村)
- Tianjialou Village (田家楼村)
- Shaoshanqian Village (杓山前村)
- Shangfangshan Village (上方山村)
- Zhongfangshan Village (中方山村)
- Nanfangshan Village (南方山村)
- Beifangshan Village (北方山村)
- Xiafangshan Village (下方山村)
- Nanlongjiao Village (南龙角村)
- Wangjiaqiao Village (王家桥村)
- Shuiquanyu Village (水泉峪村)
- Xiaguojiagou Village (下郭家沟村)
- Taohuayu Village (桃花峪村)
- Shilongkou Village (石龙口村)
- Tongshan Village (铜山村)
- Changjiazhuang Village (常家庄村)
- Wangjiahutong Village (王家胡同村)
- Changzhuang Village (常庄村)
- Shangzhou Village (上周村)
- Xiazhou Village (下周村)
- Xixing Village (西邢村)
- Dongxing Village (东邢村)
- Zhangjiazhuang Village (张家庄村)
- Gushan Village (崮山村)
- Huangya Village (黄崖村)
- Gaotang Village (高塘村)
- Zoujialanzi Village (邹家兰子村)
- Nanyu Village (南峪村)
- Beiwei Village (北围村)
- Nanwei Village (南围村)
- Caiyu Village (蔡峪村)
- Nanwenzi Village (南文字村)
- Beiwenzi Village (北文字村)
- Xigouya Village (西沟崖村)
- Xiangshuiwan Village (响水湾村)
- Xipo Village (西坡村)
- Taoyuan Village (桃园村)
- Moshiyu Village (磨石峪村)
- Nangudefan Village (南古德范村)
- Xigudefan Village (西古德范村)
- Beigudefan Village (北古德范村)
- Donggudefan Village (东古德范村)
- Luanjiazhuang Village (栾家庄村)

== See also ==
- List of township-level divisions of Shandong
