= Miaoshan High-tech Industrial Park =

Miaoshan High-tech Industrial Park 庙山高新技术产业园
- Town
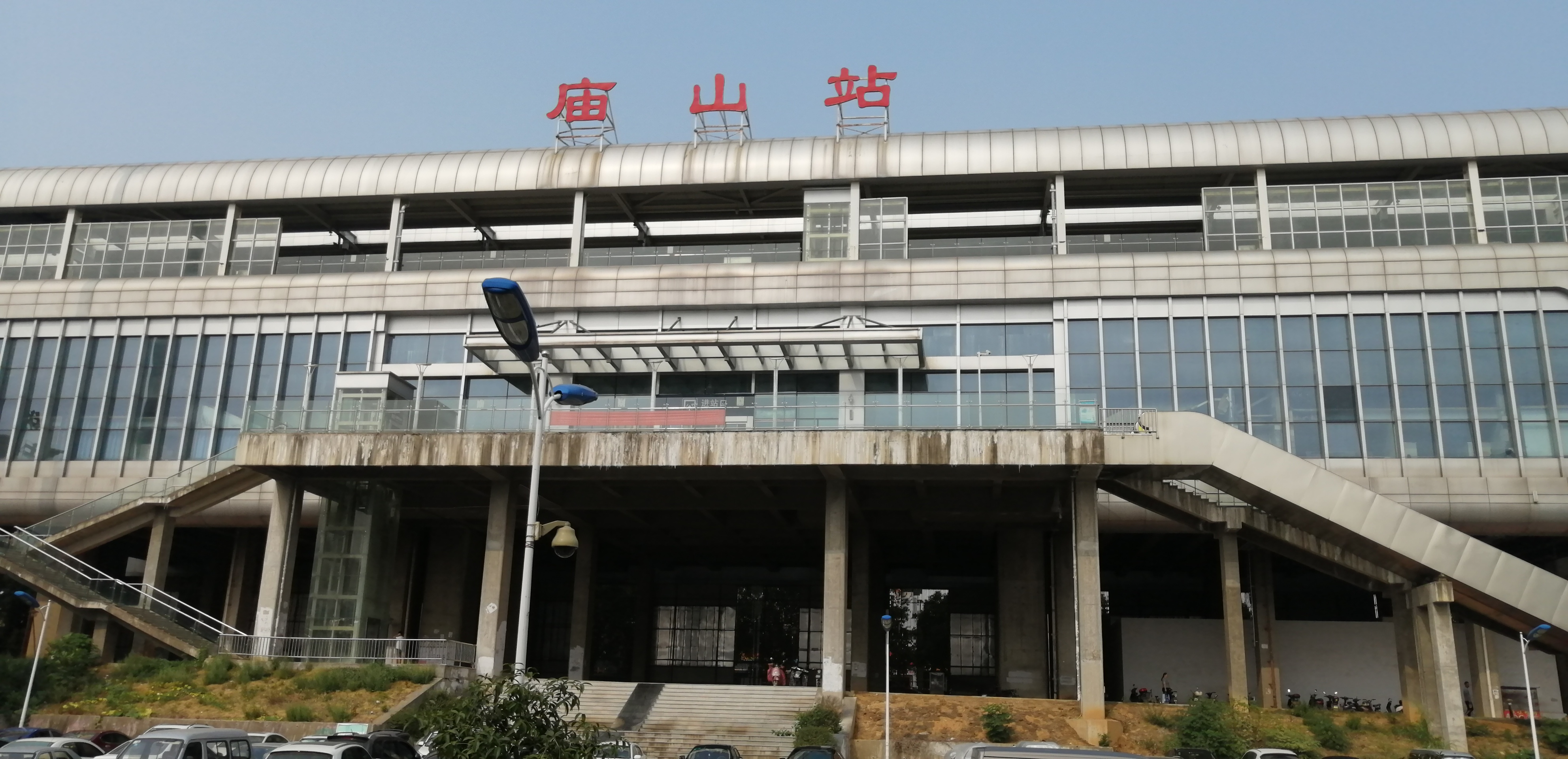
- Miaoshan Railway Station

- Location in Hubei
- Coordinates: 30°26′08″N 114°22′57″E
- Country: People's Republic of China
- Province: Hubei
- Prefecture-level city: Wuhan
- District: Jiangxia District
- Time zone: UTC+8 (China Standard)

Miaoshan High-tech Industrial Park (Chinese: 庙山高新技术产业园; pinyin: Miàoshān Gāoxīn Jìshù Chǎnyè Yuán) is a high tech industrial park in Jiangxia District, Wuhan, Hubei province, China. As of 2020, it has 7 urban communities and 7 villages under its administration:

Communities

- Meinanshan Community (梅南山社区)
- Tangxunhu Community (汤逊湖社区)
- Baoli Community (保利社区)
- Meijia Community (美加社区)
- Yangguang Community (阳光社区)
- Pu'an Community (普安社区)
- Xiangyang Community (向阳社区)

Villages

- Miaoshan Village
- Pu'an Village (普安村)
- Xiangyang Village (向阳村)
- Xingfu Village (幸福村)
- Wushu Village (邬树村)
- Huashanwu Village (花山吴村)
- Xiaozhafang Village (肖榨坊村)

== See also ==
- List of township-level divisions of Hubei
