= Taishan, Tai'an =

Taishan 泰山区
- District
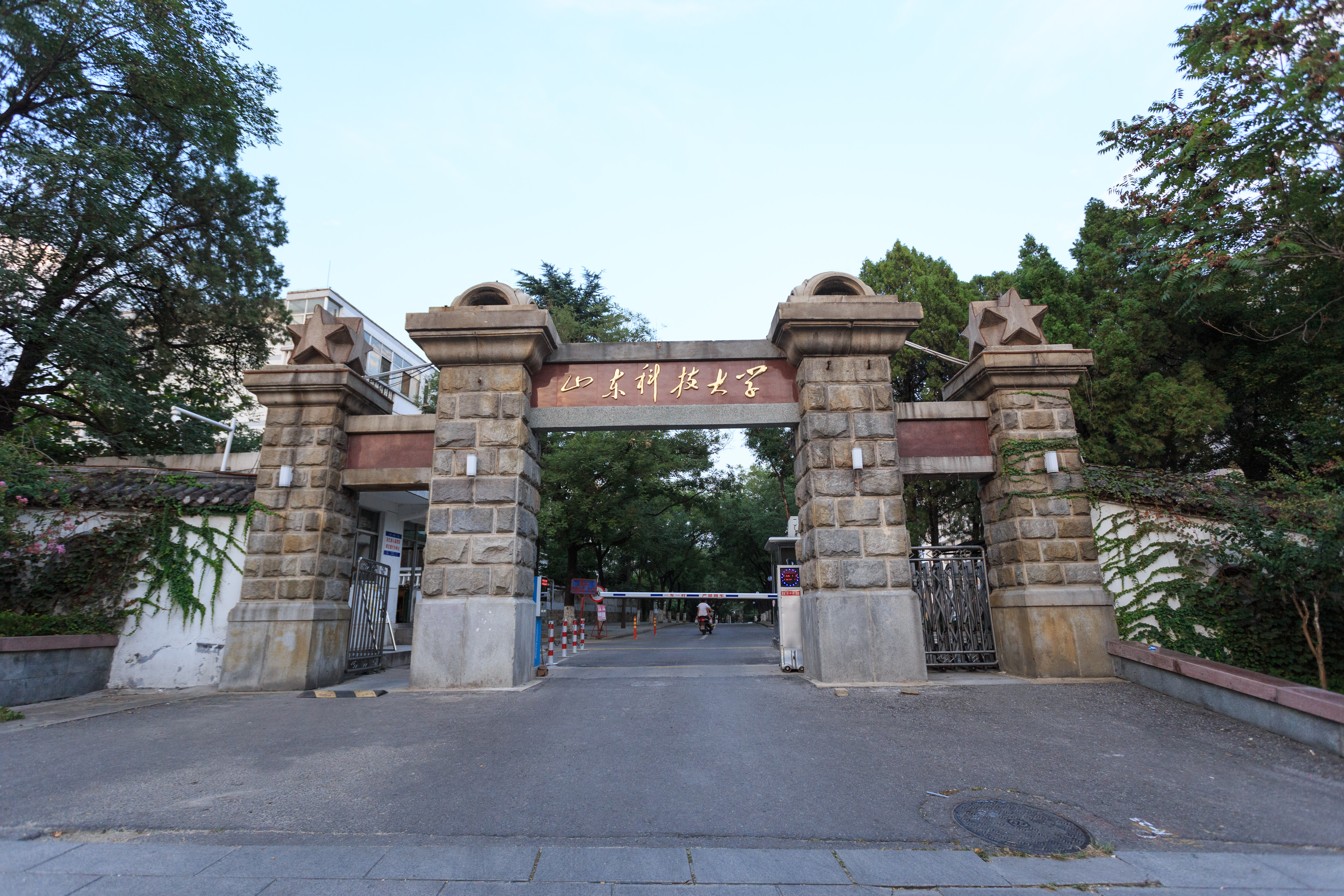
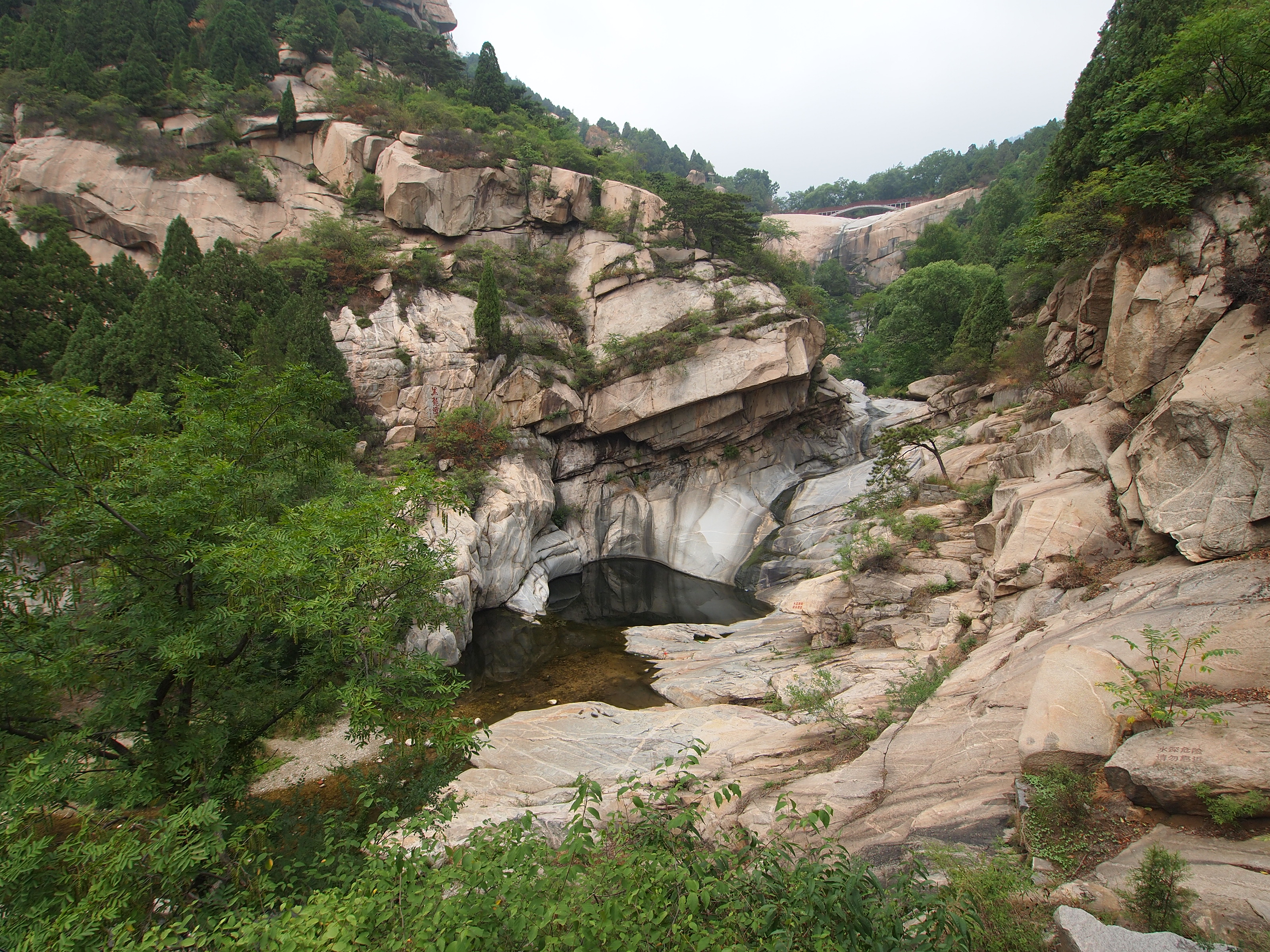
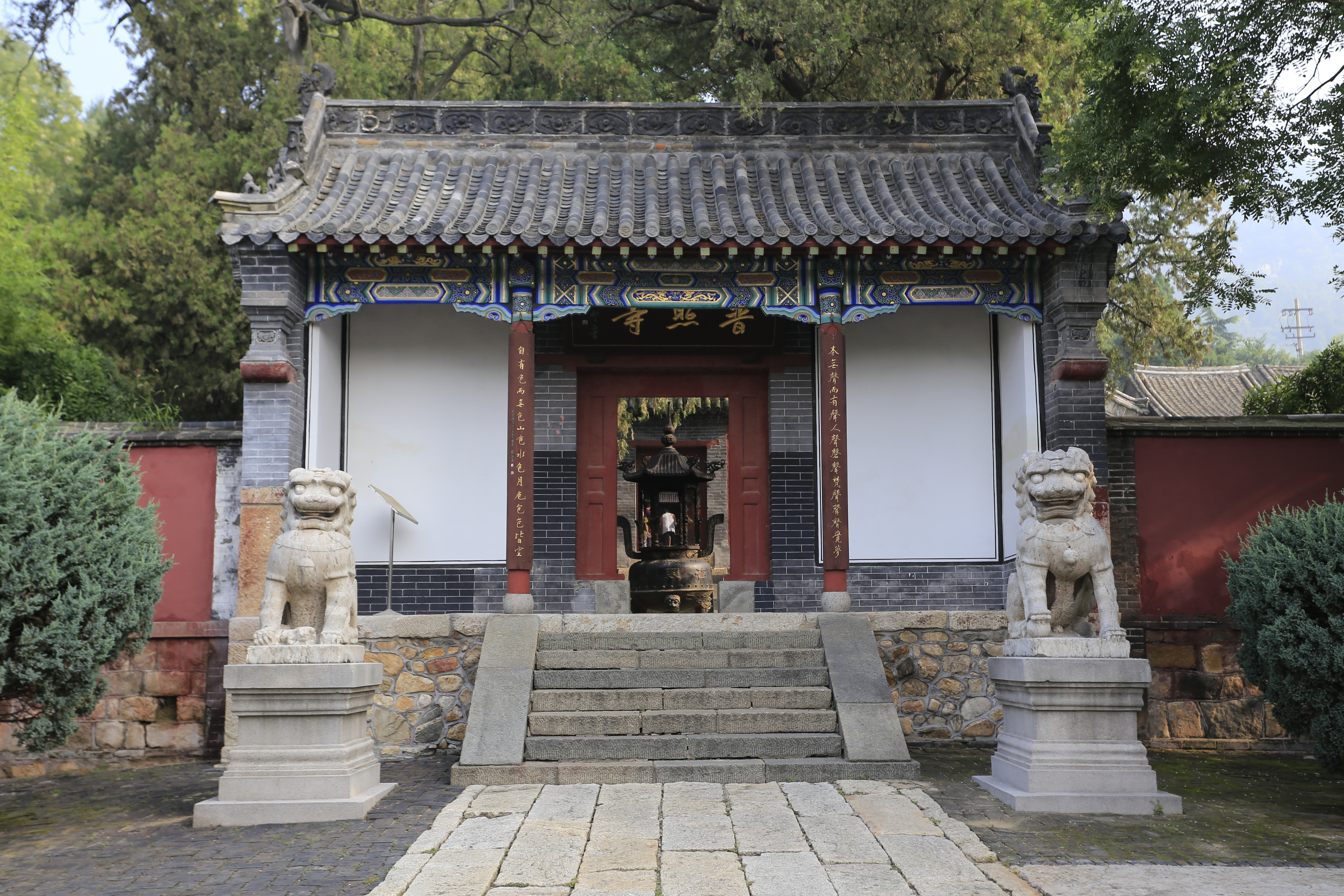
- View of Mount Tai from Taishan District Shandong University of Science and Technology Heilong Pool Puzhao Temple

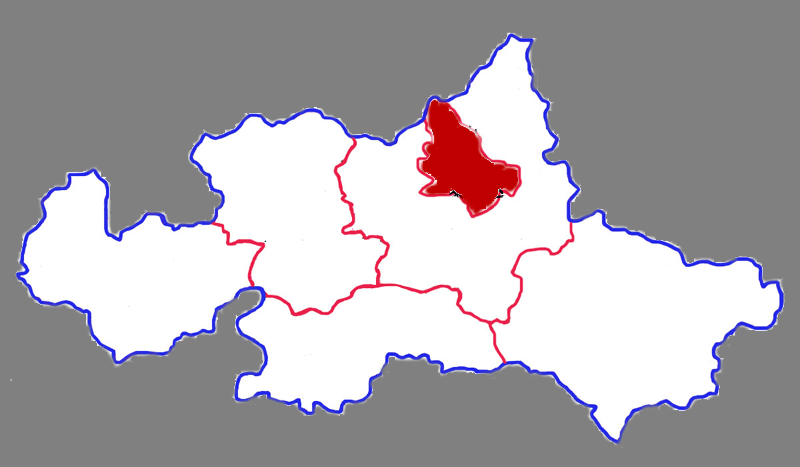
- Taishan in Tai'an

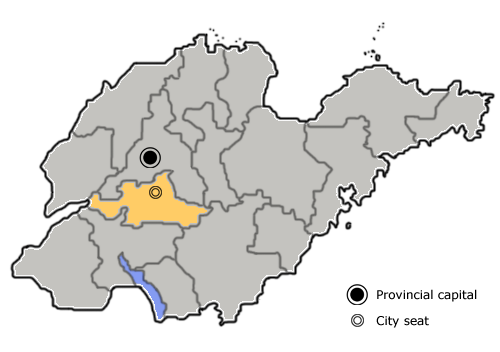
- Tai'an in Shandong
- Coordinates: 36°11′32″N 117°08′07″E
- Country: People's Republic of China
- Province: Shandong
- Prefecture-level city: Tai'an

Area
  - Total: 337 km^{2} (130 sq mi)

Population (2019)
  - Total: 743,400
  - Density: 2,210/km^{2} (5,710/sq mi)
- Time zone: UTC+8 (China Standard)
- Postal code: 271000

Taishan District (Chinese: 泰山区; pinyin: Tàishān Qū) is a district of the city of Tai'an in the Chinese province of Shandong.

Taishan has an area of 337 km^{2} (130 sq mi) and around 620,000 inhabitants (2003), and is the administrative center of Tai'an.

== Administrative divisions ==
As of 2012, this district is divided to 5 subdistricts, 2 towns and 1 township.

Subdistricts

- Daimiao Subdistrict (岱庙街道)
- Caiyuan Subdistrict (财源街道)
- Taiqian Subdistrict (泰前街道)
- Shanggao Subdistrict (上高街道)
- Xujialou Subdistrict (徐家楼街道)

Towns

- Shengzhuang (省庄镇)
- Qiujiadian (邱家店镇)

Townships

- Dajinkou Township (大津口乡)
