= Gangcheng, Jinan =

District in Shandong, China

Gangcheng 钢城区
- District
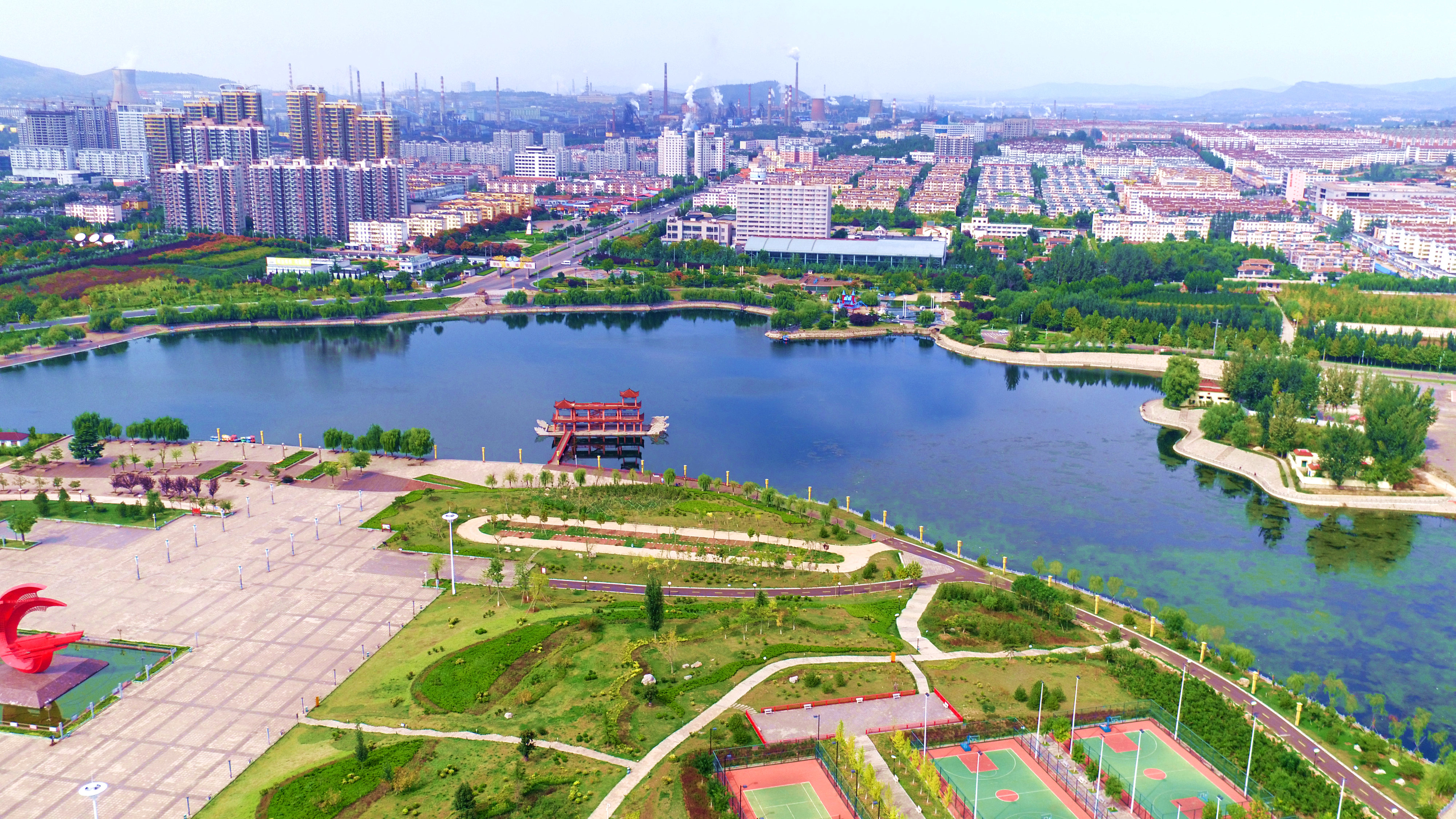
- Cityscape

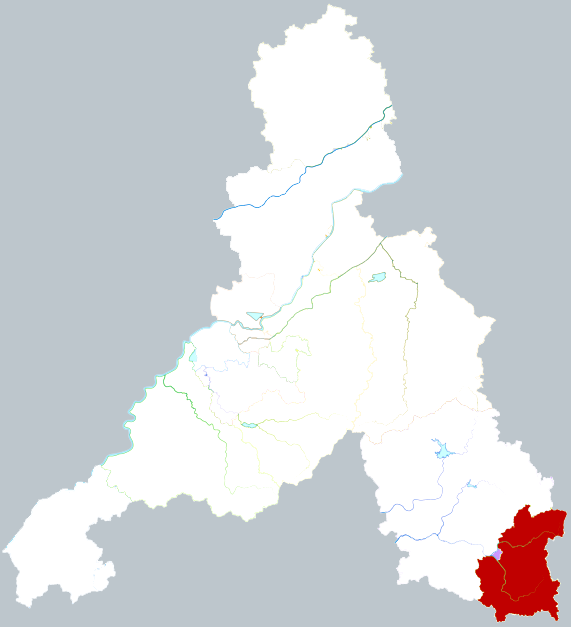
- Location of Gangcheng in the Jinan City administration

- Location of Jinan City jurisdiction in Shandong
- Coordinates: 36°03′32″N 117°48′40″E
- Country: People's Republic of China
- Province: Shandong
- Sub-provincial city: Jinan

Area
  - Total: 507 km^{2} (196 sq mi)

Population (2018)
  - Total: 330,000
  - Density: 650/km^{2} (1,700/sq mi)
- Time zone: UTC+8 (China Standard)
- Postal code: 271104
- Area code: +86 0634

Gangcheng (simplified Chinese: 钢城区; traditional Chinese: 鋼城區; pinyin: Gāngchéng Qū) is one of 10 urban districts of the prefecture-level city of Jinan, the capital of Shandong Province, East China.

It has an area of 336 km^{2} (130 sq mi) and around 240,000 inhabitants (2003).

It is named for its production of iron and steel. (Gang "钢" means "steel" in Chinese.) Laiwu Steel Corporation, the largest subsidiary of Shandong Iron and Steel Group (commonly known as Shan Steel), is headquartered in Gangcheng District.

In January 2019, the Shandong provincial government announced in a decision that Laiwu Prefecture-level city was absorbed by Jinan and Gangcheng District will also be under Jinan's administration.

== Administrative divisions ==
As of 2012, Gangcheng District is divided to 1 subdistrict and 4 towns.

Subdistricts

- Aishan Subdistrict (艾山街道)

Towns

- Yanzhuang (颜庄镇)
- Huangzhuang (黄庄镇)
- Lixin (里辛镇)
- Xinzhuang (辛庄镇)
