= Chengguan Town =

Chengguan (simplified Chinese: 城关镇; traditional Chinese: 城關鎮; pinyin: Chéngguān Zhèn; lit. 'town in the area immediately outside a city gate') could refer to nearly 200 towns of the People's Republic of China, many of which are the seats of their counties:

Note: Due to the large number of such locations, some of the provincial sections will be further divided alphabetically by prefecture.

== Anhui ==
=== Bengbu ===
- Chengguan, Guzhen County, in Guzhen County
- Chengguan, Huaiyuan County, in Huaiyuan County
- Chengguan, Wuhe County, in Wuhe County

=== Bozhou ===
- Chengguan, Lixin County
- Chengguan, Mengcheng County
- Chengguan, Guoyang County, in Guoyang County

=== Fuyang ===
- Chengguan, Linquan County, in Linquan County
- Chengguan, Taihe County, Anhui, in Taihe County

=== Huainan ===
- Chengguan, Fengtai County, in Fengtai County

=== Lu'an ===
- Chengguan, Huoqiu County, in Huoqiu County
- Chengguan, Shucheng County, in Shucheng County

== Fujian ==
- Chengguan, Youxi County, in Youxi County, Sanming

== Gansu ==
=== Gannan Tibetan Autonomous Prefecture ===
- Chengguan, Lintan County, in Lintan County
- Chengguan, Zhugqu County, in Zhugqu County

=== Jinchang ===
- Chengguan, Yongchang County, in Yongchang County

=== Lanzhou ===
- Chengguan, Yongdeng County, in Yongdeng County
- Chengguan, Yuzhong County, in Yuzhong County

=== Linxia Hui Autonomous Prefecture ===
- Chengguan, Guanghe County, in Guanghe County
- Chengguan, Hezheng County, in Hezheng County

=== Longnan ===
- Chengguan, Longnan, in Wudu District
- Chengguan, Cheng County, in Cheng County
- Chengguan, Tanchang County, in Tanchang County
- Chengguan, Hui County, in Hui County
- Chengguan, Kang County, in Kang County
- Chengguan, Li County, Gansu, in Li County
- Chengguan, Liangdang County, in Liangdang County
- Chengguan, Wen County, Gansu, in Wen County

=== Pingliang ===
- Chengguan, Jingchuan County, in Jingchuan County
- Chengguan, Jingning County, Gansu, in Jingning County

=== Qingyang ===
- Chengguan, Zhenyuan County, Gansu, in Zhenyuan County

=== Tianshui ===
- Chengguan, Wushan County, Gansu, in Wushan County

=== Zhangye ===
- Chengguan, Gaotai County, in Gaotai County

== Guangxi ==
- Chengguan, Debao County, in Debao County, Baise
- Chengguan, Nandan County, in Nandan County, Hechi
- Chengguan, Xincheng County, in Xincheng County, Laibin

== Guizhou ==
=== Anshun ===
- Chengguan, Pingba County, in Pingba County
- Chengguan, Puding County, in Puding County
- Chengguan, Zhenning County, in Zhenning Buyei and Miao Autonomous County

=== Bijie Prefecture ===
- Chengguan, Hezhang County, in Hezhang County
- Chengguan, Jinsha County, in Jinsha County
- Chengguan, Qianxi County, Guizhou, in Qianxi County
- Chengguan, Zhijin County, in Zhijin County

=== Guiyang ===
- Chengguan, Kaiyang County, in Kaiyang County

=== Liupanshui ===
- Chengguan, Pan County, in Pan County

=== Qiandongnan Miao and Dong Autonomous Prefecture ===
- Chengguan, Shibing County, in Shibing County

=== Qiannan Buyei and Miao Autonomous Prefecture ===
- Chengguan, Dushan County, in Dushan County
- Chengguan, Guiding County, in Guiding County

== Henan ==
=== Anyang ===
- Chengguan, Hua County, Henan, in Hua County
- Chengguan, Neihuang County, in Neihuang County
- Chengguan, Tangyin County, in Tangyin County

=== Hebi ===
- Chengguan, Xun County, in Xun County

=== Jiaozuo ===
- Chengguan, Xiuwu County, in Xiuwu County

=== Kaifeng ===
- Chengguan, Kaifeng County, in Xiangfu District
- Chengguan Town, Lankao County, in Lankao County
- Chengguan, Qi County, Kaifeng, in Qi County
- Chengguan, Tongxu County, in Tongxu County
- Chengguan, Weishi County, in Weishi County

=== Luoyang ===
- Chengguan, Yanshi, in Yanshi City
- Chengguan, Luanchuan County, in Luanchuan County
- Chengguan, Luoning County, in Luoning County
- Chengguan, Mengjin County, in Mengjin County
- Chengguan, Ruyang County, in Ruyang County
- Chengguan, Song County, in Song County
- Chengguan, Xin'an County, in Xin'an County
- Chengguan, Yichuan County, Henan, in Yichuan County
- Chengguan, Yiyang County, Henan, in Yiyang County

=== Luohe ===
- Chengguan, Luohe, in Yancheng District
- Chengguan, Linying County, in Linying County

=== Nanyang ===
- Chengguan, Fangcheng County, in Fangcheng County
- Chengguan, Neixiang County, in Neixiang County
- Chengguan, Nanzhao County, in Nanzhao County
- Chengguan, Tanghe County, in Tanghe County
- Chengguan, Tongbai County, in Tongbai County
- Chengguan, Xinye County, in Xinye County

=== Pingdingshan ===
- Chengguan, Baofeng County, in Baofeng County
- Chengguan, Jia County, Henan, in Jia County

=== Puyang ===
- Chengguan, Fan County, in Fan County
- Chengguan, Nanle County, in Nanle County
- Chengguan, Puyang County, in Puyang County
- Chengguan, Qingfeng County, in Qingfeng County
- Chengguan, Taiqian County, in Taiqian County

=== Sanmenxia ===
- Chengguan, Lingbao, in Lingbao City City
- Chengguan, Lushi County, in Lushi County
- Chengguan, Mianchi County, in Mianchi County

=== Shangqiu ===
- Chengguan, Yongcheng, in Yongcheng City
- Chengguan, Minquan County, in Minquan County
- Chengguan, Xiayi County, in Xiayi County
- Chengguan, Yucheng County, in Yucheng County
- Chengguan, Zhecheng County, in Zhecheng County
- Chengguan Hui Town, Ningling County, in Ningling County
- Chengguan Hui Town, Sui County, Henan, in Sui County

=== Xinxiang ===
- Chengguan, Fengqiu County, in Fengqiu County
- Chengguan, Huojia County, in Huojia County
- Chengguan, Yanjin County, Henan, in Yanjin County
- Chengguan, Yuanyang County, Henan, in Yuanyang County

=== Xinyang ===
- Chengguan, Gushi County, in Gushi County
- Chengguan, Huaibin County, in Huaibin County
- Chengguan, Luoshan County, in Luoshan County
- Chengguan, Shangcheng County, in Shangcheng County
- Chengguan, Xi County, Henan, in Xi County

=== Xuchang ===
- Chengguan, Xiangcheng County, Henan, in Xiangcheng County

=== Zhengzhou ===
- Chengguan, Xinmi, in Xinmi City
- Chengguan, Zhongmu County, in Zhongmu County

=== Zhoukou ===
- Chengguan, Dancheng County, in Dancheng County
- Chengguan, Fugou County, in Fugou County
- Chengguan, Luyi County, in Luyi County
- Chengguan, Xihua County, in Xihua County

== Hubei ==
=== Huanggang ===
- Chengguan, Hong'an County, in Hong'an County

=== Shiyan ===
- Chengguan, Fang County, in Fang County
- Chengguan, Yunyang District, in Yunyang District
- Chengguan, Yunxi County, in Yunxi County
- Chengguan, Zhushan County, in Zhushan County
- Chengguan, Zhuxi County, in Zhuxi County

=== Xiangyang ===
- Chengguan, Baokang County, in Baokang County
- Chengguan, Gucheng County, Hubei, in Gucheng County
- Chengguan, Nanzhang County, in Nanzhang County

=== Xiaogan ===
- Chengguan, Dawu County, Hubei, in Dawu County
- Chengguan, Yunmeng County, in Yunmeng County

== Hunan ==
=== Changde ===
- Chengguan, Anxiang County, in Anxiang County
- Chengguan, Linli County, in Linli County

=== Chenzhou ===
- Chengguan, Anren County, in Anren County
- Chengguan, Guidong County, in Guidong County
- Chengguan, Guiyang County, in Guiyang County
- Chengguan, Jiahe County, in Jiahe County
- Chengguan, Linwu County, in Linwu County
- Chengguan, Rucheng County, in Rucheng County
- Chengguan, Yizhang County, in Yizhang County
- Chengguan, Yongxing County, in Yongxing County

=== Hengyang ===
- Chengguan, Hengdong County, in Hengdong County

=== Yueyang ===
- Chengguan, Miluo City, in Miluo City
- Chengguan, Huarong County, in Huarong County
- Chengguan, Yueyang County, in Yueyang County

=== Zhuzhou ===
- Chengguan, Chaling County, in Chaling County
- Chengguan, You County, in You County

== Inner Mongolia ==
- Chengguan, Bayan Nur, in Linhe District, Bayan Nur City
- Chengguan, Horinger County, in Horinger County, Hohhot Prefecture
- Chengguan, Qingshuihe County, in Qingshuihe County, Hohhot Prefecture
- Chengguan, Xinghe County, in Xinghe County, Ulanqab Prefecture

== Liaoning ==
- Chengguanzhen Subdistrict (城关镇街道), in Lingyuan City

== Ningxia ==
- Chengguan, Longde County, in Longde County, Guyuan Prefecture
- Chengguan, Pingluo County, in Pingluo County, Shizuishan Prefecture

== Qinghai ==
- Chengguan, Datong Hui and Tu Autonomous County, in Datong Hui and Tu Autonomous County, Xining Prefecture
- Chengguan, Huangyuan County, in Huangyuan County, Xining Prefecture

== Shandong ==
- Chengguan, Dongming County, in Dongming County, Heze Prefecture

== Shaanxi ==
=== Ankang ===
- Chengguan, Baihe County, in Baihe County
- Chengguan, Hanyin County, in Hanyin County
- Chengguan, Langao County, in Langao County
- Chengguan, Ningshan County, in Ningshan County
- Chengguan, Pingli County, in Pingli County
- Chengguan, Shiquan County, in Shiquan County
- Chengguan, Xunyang County, in Xunyang County
- Chengguan, Zhenping County, Shaanxi, in Zhenping County
- Chengguan, Ziyang County, in Ziyang County

=== Baoji ===
- Chengguan, Fengxiang County, in Fengxiang County
- Chengguan, Fufeng County, in Fufeng County
- Chengguan, Long County, Shaanxi, in Long County
- Chengguan, Qianyang County, in Qianyang County

=== Hanzhong ===
- Chengguan, Liuba County, in Liuba County
- Chengguan, Lueyang County, in Lueyang County
- Chengguan, Nanzheng County, in Nanzheng County
- Chengguan, Xixiang County, in Xixiang County

=== Shangluo ===
- Chengguan, Luonan County, in Luonan County
- Chengguan, Shanyang County, in Shanyang County
- Chengguan, Shangnan County, in Shangnan County

=== Tongchuan ===
- Chengguan, Yijun County, in Yijun County

=== Weinan ===
- Chengguan, Baishui County, in Baishui County
- Chengguan, Chengcheng County, in Chengcheng County
- Chengguan, Dali County, in Dali County
- Chengguan, Heyang County, in Heyang County
- Chengguan, Pucheng County, Shaanxi, in Pucheng County
- Chengguan, Tongguan County, in Tongguan County

=== Xianyang ===
- Chengguan, Bin County, Shaanxi, in Bin County
- Chengguan, Chunhua County, in Chunhua County
- Chengguan, Liquan County, in Liquan County
- Chengguan, Qian County, in Qian County
- Chengguan, Sanyuan County, in Sanyuan County
- Chengguan, Xunyi County, in Xunyi County

=== Yan'an ===
- Chengguan, Ganquan County, in Ganquan County

== Sichuan ==
- Chengguan, Huili County, in Huili County, Liangshan Yi Autonomous Prefecture

== Tianjin ==
- Chengguan, Tianjin, in Wuqing District, Tianjin

== Tibet ==
- Chengguan, Chamdo, in Karub District, Chamdo

== Xinjiang ==
- Chengguan, Fukang, in Fukang City, Changji Hui Autonomous Prefecture

== Zhejiang ==
- Chengguan, Kaihua County, in Kaihua County, Quzhou Prefecture

== Formerly existed or named as "Chengguan" ==
- Chengguan, Funan County, former seat of Funan County, Anhui; in 2006 it was merged, along with Chengjiao Township to form the town of Lucheng (鹿城镇)
- Chengguan, Shangshui County, former seat of Shangshui County, Henan; merged sometime between 2006 and 2009
- Shuitou, Jiaokou County, Shanxi, named Chengguan until 2001
