= Chengguan =

Chengguan may refer to:

- Chengguan (agency) (Chinese: 城管; pinyin: Chéngguǎn), an administrative practice of city-level local governments in China
- Chengguan (monk), fully known as Qingliang Chengguan (清涼澄觀; 738–839), Chinese monk, representative of the Huayan school of Chinese Buddhism

== Districts of China ==
Chengguan District (Chinese: 城关区; pinyin: Chéngguān Qū)

- Chengguan District, Lanzhou, in Lanzhou prefecture-level city, Gansu
- Chengguan District, Lhasa, or simply Lhasa, the core district of Lhasa prefecture-level city, Tibet

== Subdistricts of China ==
Chengguan Subdistrict (Chinese: 城关街道; pinyin: Chéngguān Jiēdào)

- Chengguan Subdistrict, Beijing, in Fangshan District, Beijing
- Chengguan Subdistrict, Sanming, in Sanyuan District, Sanming, Fujian
- Chengguan Subdistrict, Jinta County, subdivision of Jinta County, Gansu
- Chengguan Subdistrict, Huixian, subdivision of Huixian, Henan
- Chengguan Subdistrict, Beipiao, subdivision of Beipiao, Liaoning
- Chengguan Subdistrict, Lingyuan, subdivision of Lingyuan, Liaoning
- Chengguan Subdistrict, Zhuanghe, subdivision of Zhuanghe, Liaoning
- Chengguan, Fufeng, subdivision of Fufeng County, Shaanxi
- Chengguan Subdistrict, Shangluo, in Shangzhou District, Shangluo, Shaanxi
- Chengguan Subdistrict, Tongchuan, in Yintai District, Tongchuan, Shaanxi
- Chengguan Subdistrict, Dongming County, subdivision of Dongming County, Shandong
- Chengguan Subdistrict, Linqu County, subdivision of Linqu County, Shandong
- Chengguan Subdistrict, Weifang, in Weicheng District, Weifang, Shandong

== See also ==
- Chengguan Town (disambiguation), for all towns named Chengguan
- Chengguan Township (disambiguation), for all townships named Chengguan
