= Bozhou Airport =

Airport in Bozhou, Anhui, China

Bozhou Airport 亳州机场
- IATA: BZJ; ICAO: ZSBO

Summary
- Airport type: Public
- Serves: Bozhou
- Location: Guoyang, Anhui, China
- Opened: 12 November 2025; 11 months ago
- Coordinates: 33°33′37″N 115°54′33″E
- Interactive map of Bozhou Airport

Runways
Direction	Length		Surface
Direction	m	ft	Surface
08/26	2,600	8,530	Concrete

Bozhou Airport (IATA: BZJ, ICAO: ZSBO) is a civil airport serving the city of Bozhou in East China's Anhui province. It is located in Guoyang County of Bozhou, 33 km (21 mi) southeast of downtown Bozhou. The airport is designed to handle 1 million passengers annually. The airport was officially named on 1 October 2023, without a secondary name.

== Facilities ==
Bozhou Airport is classified as a 4C-grade airport. It hosts a 2,600-meter-long runway as well as eight parking stands.

== Airlines and destinations ==
Airlines	Destinations
Beijing Capital Airlines	Beijing–Daxing, Haikou
GX Airlines	Harbin, Nanning
Shanghai Airlines	Changchun, Kunming
Tianjin Airlines	Tianjin, Xiamen

== See also ==
- List of airports in China
- Bengbu Tenghu Airport (another civil airport in northern Anhui)
