= Qiaocheng, Bozhou =

Qiaocheng 谯城区
- District
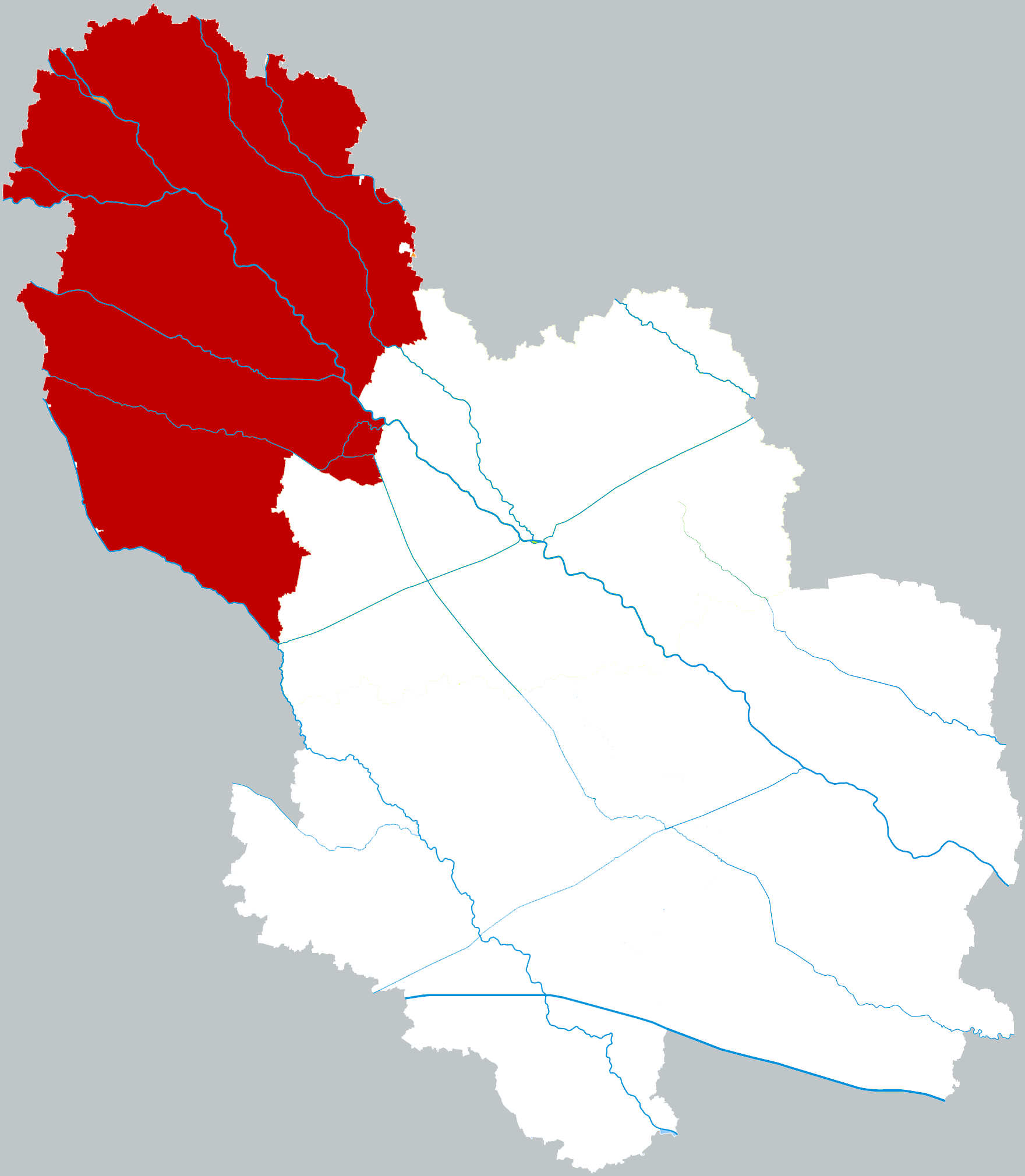
- Location of Qiaocheng inside Bozhou
- Coordinates: 33°45′16″N 115°53′07″E
- Country: People's Republic of China
- Province: Anhui
- Prefecture-level city: Bozhou

Area
  - Total: 2,226 km^{2} (859 sq mi)

Population
  - Total: 1,632,000
- Time zone: UTC+8 (China Standard)
- Postal code: 236800

Qiaocheng District (simplified Chinese: 谯城区; traditional Chinese: 譙城區; pinyin: Qiáochéng Qū), formerly named Bo County (亳县), anciently named Qiao County (谯县), is a district of the city of Bozhou, Anhui Province, China.

== Administrative divisions ==
In the present, Qiaocheng District has 3 subdistricts, 18 towns and 2 townships.

3 subdistricts

- Tangling (汤陵街道)
- Huaxilou (花戏楼街道)
- Xuege (薛阁街道)

18 towns

- Gujing (古井镇)
- Shuanggou (双沟镇)
- Gucheng (古城镇)
- Feihe (淝河镇)
- Dayang (大杨镇)
- Chengfu (城父镇)
- Shihe (十河镇)
- Shuangtang (观堂镇)
- Wuma (五马镇)
- Weigang (魏岗镇)
- Niuji (牛集镇)
- Lumiao (芦庙镇)
- Longyang (龙扬镇)
- Qiaodong (谯东镇)
- Shatu (沙土镇)
- Shibali (十八里镇)
- Shijiuli (十九里镇)
- Yanji (颜集镇)

2 townships

- Zhangdian (张店乡)
- Zhaoqiao (赵桥乡)
