= Dianji, Anhui =

Dianji 店集镇
- Town
- Interactive map of Dianji
- Coordinates: 33°23′38″N 115°59′17″E
- Country: People's Republic of China
- Province: Anhui
- Prefecture-level city: Bozhou
- County: Guoyang
- Elevation: 32 m (105 ft)
- Time zone: UTC+8 (China Standard)

Dianji (Chinese: 店集; pinyin: Diànjí) is a town in Guoyang County in northwestern Anhui province, China, located around 24 kilometres (15 mi) southwest of the county seat and 54 kilometres (34 mi) south-southeast of downtown Bozhou. As of 2011, it has one residential community (社区) and 9 villages under its administration.

== See also ==
- List of township-level divisions of Anhui
