= Lixin County =

Coordinates: 33°10′23″N 116°10′05″E

Lixin 利辛县
- County
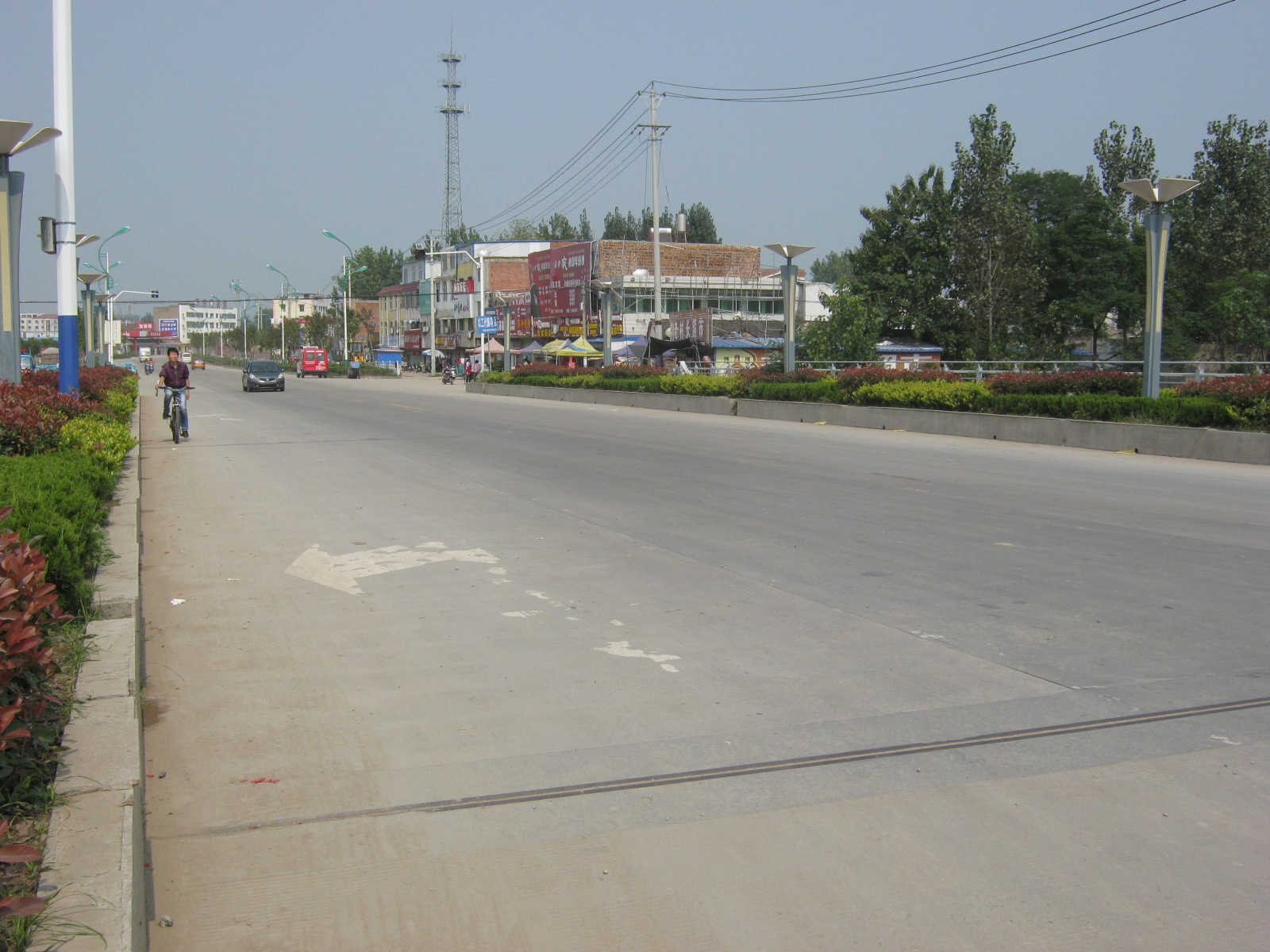

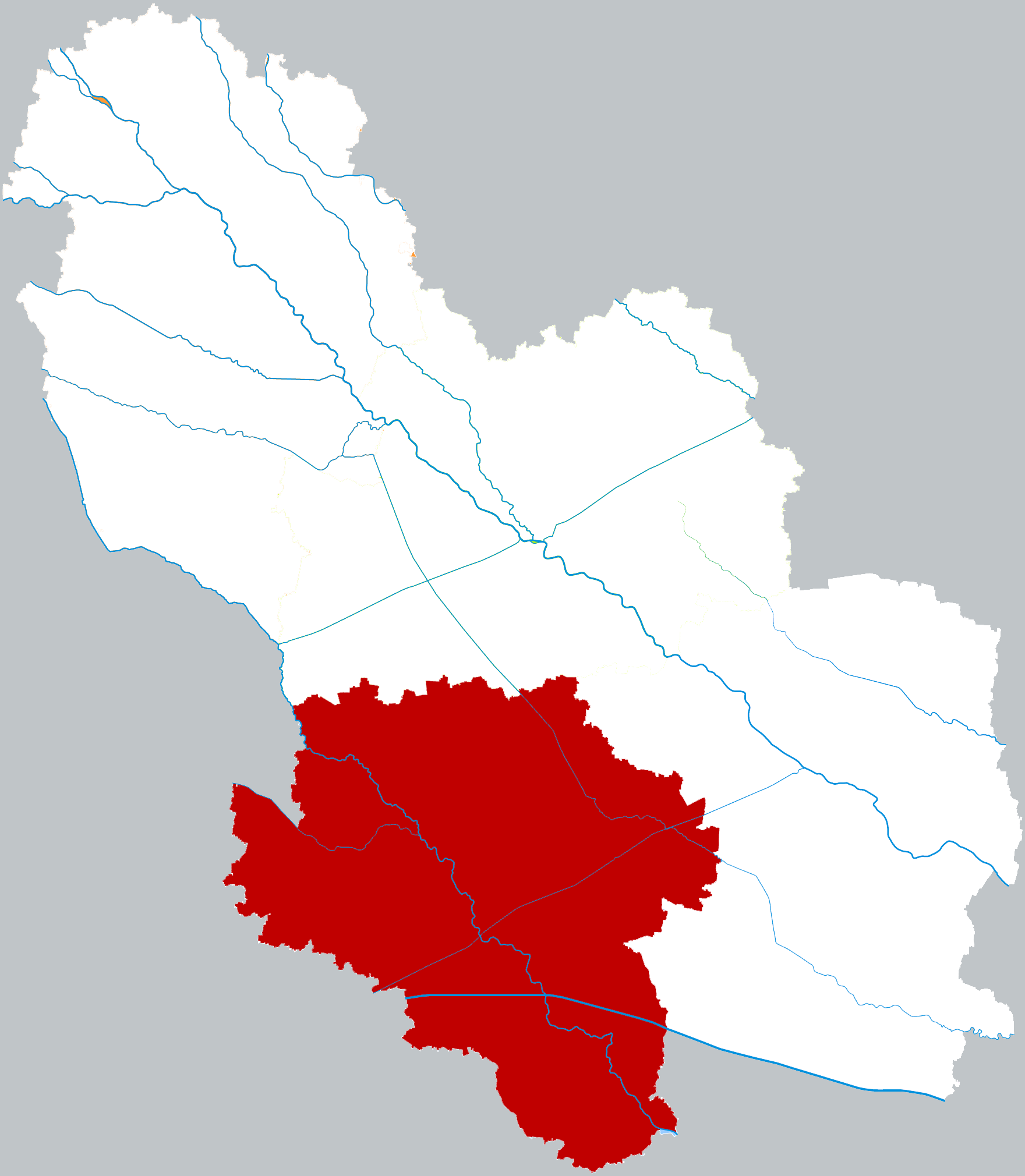
- Location of Lixin in Bozhou
- Country: People's Republic of China
- Province: Anhui
- Prefecture-level city: Bozhou
- County seat: Chengguan

Area
  - Total: 1,950 km^{2} (750 sq mi)
- Elevation: 29 m (95 ft)

Population (2017)
  - Total: 1,236,000
  - Density: 634/km^{2} (1,640/sq mi)
- Time zone: UTC+8 (China Standard)
- Postal code: 236700
- Area code: 0558
- Website: www.lixin.gov.cn

Lixin (Chinese: 利辛; pinyin: Lìxīn) is a county located in north-eastern Anhui province, China, under the jurisdiction of Bozhou City. It is a county famous for its education system and beef production. An agricultural county, the people of Lixin have depended on farming (mainly wheat) for hundreds of years.

== History ==
Lixin county is a fairly young geopolitical entity among those that have been many thousands of years in China. The creation of the county did not occur until the People's Republic of China was established in 1949. In the late 1960s, Lixin was created by the combination of parts from three neighbouring counties: Guoyang, Mengcheng and Fuyang.

A county part of Fuyang city, Lixin was recently joined by six other counties to form the prefecture-level city, Bozhou.

== Administrative divisions ==
Lixin County has 19 towns and 4 townships.

19 Towns

- Chengguan (城关镇)
- Wangtuan (望疃镇)
- Kantuan (阚疃镇)
- Zhangcun (张村镇)
- Zhangou (展沟镇)
- Jiangji (江集镇)
- Jiucheng (旧城镇)
- Xipanlou (西潘楼镇)
- Sunji (孙集镇)
- Ruji (汝集镇)
- Gongdian (巩店镇)
- Wuren (五人镇)
- Wangshi (王市镇)
- Yongxing (永兴镇)
- Madianzi (马店孜镇)
- Daliji (大李集镇)
- Huji (胡集镇)
- Chengjiaji (程家集镇)
- Zhongtuan (中疃镇)

4 Townships

- Liujiaji (刘家集乡)
- Jiwangchang (纪王场乡)
- Sunmiao (孙庙乡)
- Xinzhangji (新张集乡)
- Shuangqiao (双桥乡) - it was merged to other.
- Chundian (春店乡) - it was merged to other.
- Danfeng (丹凤乡) - it was merged to other.

== Climate ==
Climate data for Lixin, elevation 28 m (92 ft), (1991–2020 normals, extremes 1981–present)
Month	Jan	Feb	Mar	Apr	May	Jun	Jul	Aug	Sep	Oct	Nov	Dec	Year
Record high °C (°F)	19.9 (67.8)	26.8 (80.2)	34.6 (94.3)	33.2 (91.8)	37.2 (99.0)	39.6 (103.3)	40.7 (105.3)	38.4 (101.1)	37.9 (100.2)	34.3 (93.7)	28.2 (82.8)	22.0 (71.6)	40.7 (105.3)
Mean daily maximum °C (°F)	6.5 (43.7)	9.8 (49.6)	15.0 (59.0)	21.6 (70.9)	26.9 (80.4)	31.1 (88.0)	32.2 (90.0)	31.1 (88.0)	27.6 (81.7)	22.6 (72.7)	15.4 (59.7)	8.8 (47.8)	20.7 (69.3)
Daily mean °C (°F)	1.6 (34.9)	4.6 (40.3)	9.5 (49.1)	15.8 (60.4)	21.2 (70.2)	25.8 (78.4)	27.8 (82.0)	26.8 (80.2)	22.5 (72.5)	16.9 (62.4)	10 (50)	3.8 (38.8)	15.5 (59.9)
Mean daily minimum °C (°F)	−2.0 (28.4)	0.5 (32.9)	5.0 (41.0)	10.7 (51.3)	16.2 (61.2)	21.1 (70.0)	24.4 (75.9)	23.5 (74.3)	18.6 (65.5)	12.5 (54.5)	5.8 (42.4)	0.0 (32.0)	11.4 (52.5)
Record low °C (°F)	−14.3 (6.3)	−16.8 (1.8)	−6.0 (21.2)	−1.1 (30.0)	4.9 (40.8)	12.3 (54.1)	18.0 (64.4)	14.6 (58.3)	8.8 (47.8)	0.6 (33.1)	−8.7 (16.3)	−19.8 (−3.6)	−19.8 (−3.6)
Average precipitation mm (inches)	25.3 (1.00)	31.5 (1.24)	48.5 (1.91)	49.6 (1.95)	75.8 (2.98)	138.7 (5.46)	221.4 (8.72)	141.1 (5.56)	83.3 (3.28)	51.4 (2.02)	38.8 (1.53)	21.2 (0.83)	926.6 (36.48)
Average precipitation days (≥ 0.1 mm)	6.2	7.2	7.6	7.3	8.6	9.1	12.7	11.1	8.3	7.4	7.1	5.4	98
Average snowy days	4.3	2.9	1.1	0	0	0	0	0	0	0	0.8	1.6	10.7
Average relative humidity (%)	71	70	70	72	72	71	82	84	78	73	72	70	74
Mean monthly sunshine hours	125.0	126.6	160.0	191.2	197.5	177.6	182.5	171.9	155.4	156.6	141.6	132.8	1,918.7
Percentage possible sunshine	39	40	43	49	46	42	42	42	42	45	46	43	43
Source: China Meteorological Administration
