= Feihe, Bozhou =

Feihe 淝河镇
- Town
- Location in China
- Coordinates: 33°33′42″N 115°38′56″E
- Country: People's Republic of China
- Province: Anhui
- Prefecture-level city: Bozhou
- District: Qiaocheng District
- Time zone: UTC+8 (China Standard)

Feihe (Chinese: 淝河; pinyin: Féihé) is a town in Qiaocheng District, Bozhou, Anhui. As of 2020, it administers one residential neighborhood (Feihe) and the following nine villages:

- Fanqiao Village (凡桥村)
- Fengwa Village (冯洼村)
- Lixiaomiao Village (李小庙村)
- Luoji Village (罗集村)
- Sili Village (四李村)
- Dianji Village (店集村)
- Dakang Village (大康村)
- Liyao Village (李腰村)
- Yangzhuang Village (杨庄村)
