= Woyang County =

Woyang County may refer to:

- Woyang County (沃陽縣) in Yanmen Commandery under the Qin and Han dynasties
- Mispronunciation of Guoyang County (涡阳县) in Bozhou Prefecture, Anhui, China
