= Cheng County =

Cheng County 成县
- County
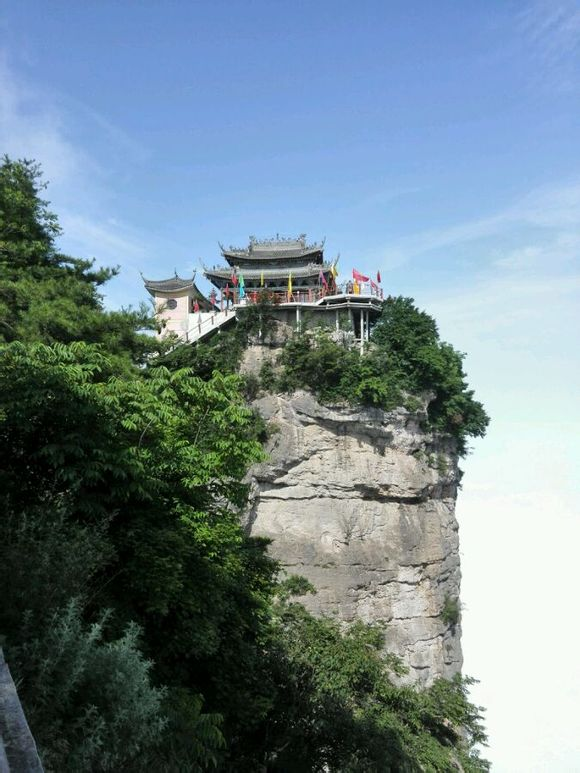
- Chifeng Mountain National Forest Park

- Location of the seat in Gansu
- Coordinates: 33°55′N 105°40′E
- Country: China
- Province: Gansu
- Prefecture-level city: Longnan
- County seat: Chengguan (城关镇)

Area
  - Total: 1,780 km^{2} (690 sq mi)

Population (2019)
  - Total: 246,900
  - Density: 139/km^{2} (359/sq mi)
- Time zone: UTC+8 (China Standard)
- Postal code: 742500
- Website: www.gs.xinhuanet.com/chengxian/index.htm

Cheng County or Chengxian (simplified Chinese: 成县; traditional Chinese: 成縣; pinyin: Chéng Xiàn) is a county under the administration of Longnan City, in southeastern Gansu Province of China. It has a land area of 1,780 square kilometers and a population of 250,000 in 2004. The postal code is 742500, and the county seat is located in Chengguan Town.

== Economy ==
Located between mountains, it has a temperate climate, favourable for agriculture. The mountains have lead and zinc ore deposits. In January 2021, the Qingni River in Chengxian was found to be polluted with thallium from zinc production wastewater.

Chengxian is noted for its walnut production. Chengxian walnuts were designated a protected origin product in China in 2014.

== Administrative divisions ==
Cheng County is divided into 14 towns and 3 townships.

=== Towns ===
- Chengguan (城关镇)
- Huangzhu (黄渚镇)
- Hongchuan (红川镇)
- Xiaochuan (小川镇)
- Zhifang (纸坊镇)
- Paosha (抛沙镇)

Towns upgraded from Township

- Diancun (店村镇)
- Wangmo (王磨镇)
- Chenyuan (陈院镇)
- Shaba (沙坝镇)
- Huangchen (黄陈镇)
- Jifeng (鸡峰镇)
- Suyuan (苏元镇)
- Suochi (索池镇)

=== Townships ===
- Songping Township (宋坪乡)
- Erlang Township (二郎乡)
- Luohe Township (镡河乡)

Former Townships

- Zhiqi Township (支旗乡)
- Nankang Township (南康乡)
- Shuiquan Township (水泉乡)
- Huaya Township (化育乡)
- Tanhe Township (坦河乡)
- Tanba Township (坦坝乡)
- Daping Township (大坪乡)

== Climate ==
Climate data for Chengxian, elevation 970 m (3,180 ft), (1991–2020 normals, extremes 1981–2010)
Month	Jan	Feb	Mar	Apr	May	Jun	Jul	Aug	Sep	Oct	Nov	Dec	Year
Record high °C (°F)	16.3 (61.3)	20.8 (69.4)	28.6 (83.5)	32.5 (90.5)	34.0 (93.2)	37.2 (99.0)	36.5 (97.7)	36.3 (97.3)	35.4 (95.7)	27.7 (81.9)	22.8 (73.0)	15.2 (59.4)	37.2 (99.0)
Mean daily maximum °C (°F)	5.9 (42.6)	9.2 (48.6)	14.7 (58.5)	21.0 (69.8)	24.7 (76.5)	28.1 (82.6)	29.8 (85.6)	28.6 (83.5)	23.1 (73.6)	17.5 (63.5)	12.1 (53.8)	6.9 (44.4)	18.5 (65.3)
Daily mean °C (°F)	0.0 (32.0)	3.4 (38.1)	8.2 (46.8)	13.6 (56.5)	17.5 (63.5)	21.4 (70.5)	23.7 (74.7)	22.7 (72.9)	18.0 (64.4)	12.5 (54.5)	6.6 (43.9)	1.0 (33.8)	12.4 (54.3)
Mean daily minimum °C (°F)	−4.0 (24.8)	−0.9 (30.4)	3.2 (37.8)	7.6 (45.7)	11.6 (52.9)	15.9 (60.6)	19.0 (66.2)	18.4 (65.1)	14.6 (58.3)	9.2 (48.6)	2.8 (37.0)	−3.0 (26.6)	7.9 (46.2)
Record low °C (°F)	−12.7 (9.1)	−11.1 (12.0)	−9.6 (14.7)	−3.8 (25.2)	−0.1 (31.8)	4.7 (40.5)	11.4 (52.5)	10.4 (50.7)	4.5 (40.1)	−4.8 (23.4)	−8.9 (16.0)	−14.7 (5.5)	−14.7 (5.5)
Average precipitation mm (inches)	6.6 (0.26)	9.0 (0.35)	21.0 (0.83)	40.6 (1.60)	63.7 (2.51)	80.0 (3.15)	119.9 (4.72)	113.6 (4.47)	94.1 (3.70)	56.5 (2.22)	15.0 (0.59)	3.4 (0.13)	623.4 (24.53)
Average precipitation days (≥ 0.1 mm)	6.3	6.9	8.7	9.5	11.8	11.6	12.1	12.4	13.9	13.8	7.7	4.3	119
Average snowy days	9.2	5.3	1.4	0.2	0	0	0	0	0	0	1.1	4.2	21.4
Average relative humidity (%)	70	69	66	67	71	72	75	78	83	83	79	73	74
Mean monthly sunshine hours	117.2	101.1	134.9	164.9	180.4	165.5	169.8	159.1	91.7	89.6	99.3	121.7	1,595.2
Percentage possible sunshine	37	32	36	42	42	39	39	39	25	26	32	40	36
Source: China Meteorological Administration

== Transportation ==
Longnan Chengzhou Airport opened in 2018 and offers domestic flights. The Tianshui–Longnan railway started construction in 2020 and will be the first railway to serve the county.

China National Highway 567 and G7011 Shiyan–Tianshui Expressway are the main roads connecting the county.
