= China National Highway 566 =

Road in China

National Highway 566
- 566国道

Route information
- Length: 259 km (161 mi)

Major junctions
- From: Xiji, Ningxia
- To: Tianshui, Gansu

Location
- Country: China

Highway system
- National Trunk Highway System; Primary; Auxiliary
← G565	→ G567

China National Highway 566 runs from Xiji in Ningxia to Tianshui in Gansu. At Xiji, it connects to G309 and at Tianshui to G310. Most of the route consists of upgraded sections of Ningxia provincial highway S202 and Gansu provincial highways S305 and S218. It is one of the new trunk highways proposed in the China National Highway Network Planning (2013 - 2030).

== Route table ==
Route and distance

City	Distance (km)
Xiji, Ningxia	0
Jingning, Gansu	66
Zhuanglang County, Gansu	142
Zhangjiachuan, Gansu	190
Qingshui, Gansu	227
Tianshui, Gansu	259

== See also ==
- China National Highways
