= Catocala florianii =

Scientific classification
- Kingdom: Animalia
- Phylum: Arthropoda
- Clade: Pancrustacea
- Class: Insecta
- Order: Lepidoptera
- Superfamily: Noctuoidea
- Family: Erebidae
- Genus: Catocala
- Species: C. florianii

Binomial name
- Catocala florianii Saldaitis & Ivinskis, 2008

Species of moth

Catocala florianii is a moth in the family Erebidae. It is known from Lueyang in Shaanxi, China. It is named for Alessandro Floriani.

The forewing length is 20–22 mm (0.79–0.87 in).
