= Yongxing, Anhui =

Coordinates: 33.0889°N 116.02061°E

Yongxing 永兴镇
- Town

Chinese transcription(s)
- Interactive map of Yongxing
- Country: China
- Province: Anhui
- Prefecture: Bozhou
- County: Lixin County
- Time zone: UTC+8 (China Standard Time)

Yongxing (Chinese: 永兴; pinyin: Yǒngxīng) is a township-level division situated in Lixin County, Bozhou, Anhui, China.

== See also ==
- List of township-level divisions of Anhui
