= China National Highway 567 =

Road in China

National Highway 567
- 567国道

Route information
- Length: 117.326 km (72.903 mi)

Major junctions
- From: Lixian
- To: Kangxian

Location
- Country: China

Highway system
- National Trunk Highway System; Primary; Auxiliary
← G566	→ G568

China National Highway 567 runs from Lixian to where it meets G345 in Changba, Kangxian. Large parts of the route are relabeled from Gansu provincial highways S205 and S219. G7011 Shiyan–Tianshui Expressway runs parallel to the road on several sections. It is one of the new trunk highways proposed in the China National Highway Network Planning (2013 - 2030).

== See also ==
- China National Highways
