= China National Highway 565 =

Road in China

National Highway 565
- 565国道

Major junctions
- From: Zanda
- To: Suoduo village, Gar County

Location
- Country: China

Highway system
- National Trunk Highway System; Primary; Auxiliary
← G564	→ G566

China National Highway 565 (G565, simplified Chinese: 565国道; traditional Chinese: 565國道) connects Zanda to G219. It is one of the new trunk highways proposed in the China National Highway Network Planning (2013 - 2030).

== See also ==
- China National Highways
