= Xujiaping =

Xujiaping 徐家坪镇
- Town
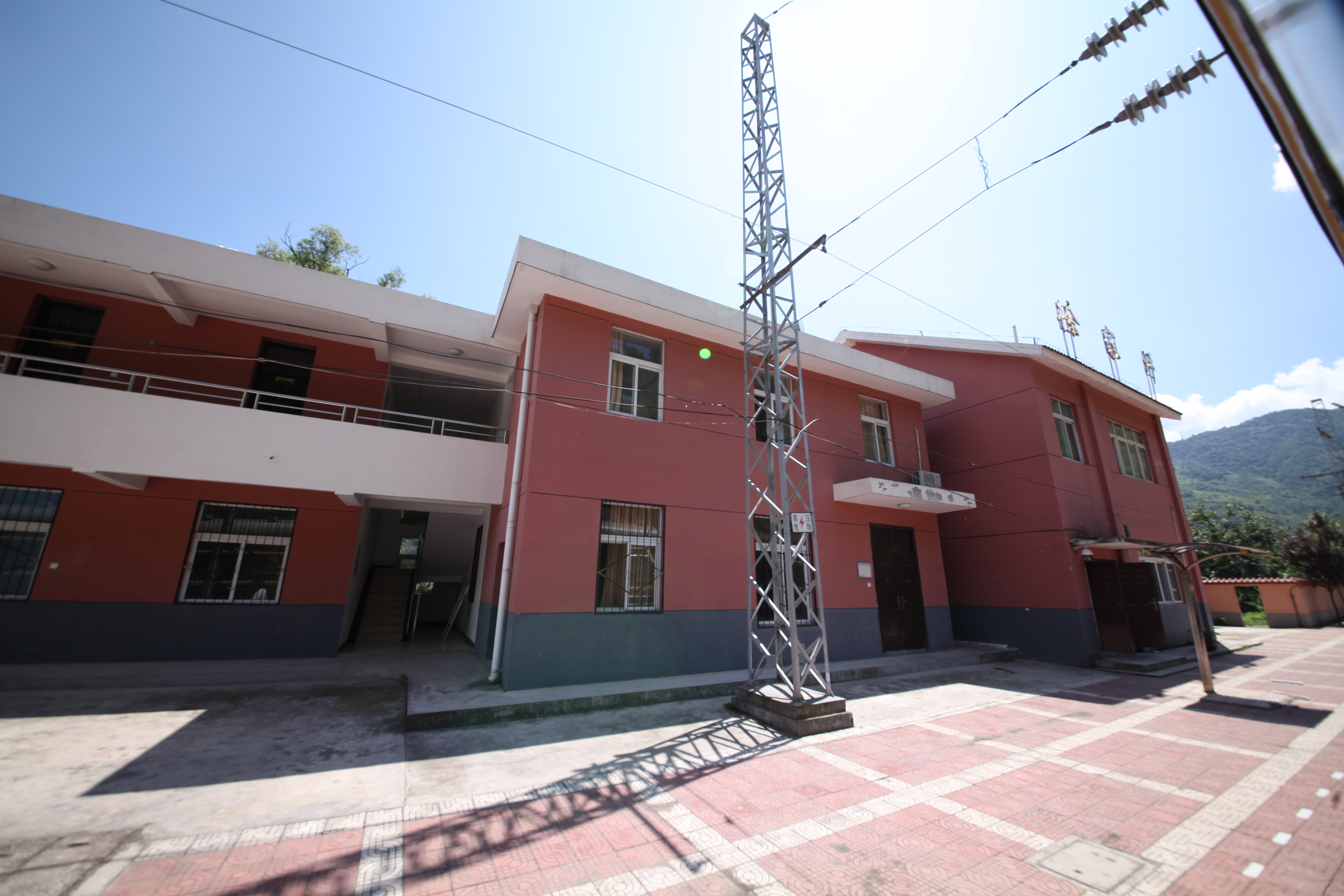
- Xujiaping train station

- Location in China
- Coordinates: 33°24′11″N 106°3′29″E
- Country: China
- Province: Shaanxi
- Prefecture-level city: Hanzhong
- County: Lueyang County

Area
  - Total: 130 km^{2} (50 sq mi)
- Time zone: UTC+8 (CST)
- Postal code: 723000
- Area code: 0916

Xujiaping (Chinese: 徐家坪; pinyin: Xújiāpíng) is a town in Lueyang County, Hanzhong, Shaanxi, China. As of 2020, neighborhoods and villages in Xujiaping include:

- Xujiaping Neighborhood (徐家坪社区)
- Mingshuiba Village (明水坝村)
- Mao'ergou Village (猫儿沟村)
- Liujiazhuang Village (刘家庄村)
- Zhangjiazhuang Village (张家庄村)
- Erfangshan Village (二房山村)
- Zhoujiaba Village (周家坝村)
- Zhu'erba Village (朱儿坝村)
- Jiekou Village (街口村)
- Qinggangping Village (青岗坪村)
- Peijiazhuang Village (裴家庄村)
- Yaomuyuan Village (药木院村)
- Qinjiaba Village (秦家坝村)
- Yuchizi Village (鱼池子村)
- Dashuigou Village (大水沟村)

The town was economically struck by the 2008 Sichuan earthquake, as most buildings were destroyed similar to surrounding towns. Xujiaping was visited by then-vice president Xi Jinping.
