= BZJ (disambiguation) =

BZJ may refer to:

- ISO 639 code BZJ, which is assigned to Belizean Creole
- IATA code BZJ, which is assigned to Bozhou Airport
- RPO code BZJ, which is assigned to the 2005 Pontinac GTO
- WPLW-FM, historically branded as "96.9 BZJ"
