= China National Highway 568 =

Road in China

National Highway 568
- 568国道

Route information
- Length: 117.326 km (72.903 mi)

Major junctions
- From: Lanzhou
- To: Luqu

Location
- Country: China

Highway system
- National Trunk Highway System; Primary; Auxiliary
← G567	→ G569

China National Highway 568 runs from Lanzhou to Luqu via Linxia and Xiahe. It is one of the new trunk highways proposed in the China National Highway Network Planning (2013 - 2030).

== Route ==
City	Distance
Lanzhou	
Yongjing County	
Linxia City	
Linxia County	
Xiahe County	

== See also ==
- China National Highways
