= Wangtuan, Anhui =

Wangtuan 望疃
- Town
- 望疃镇
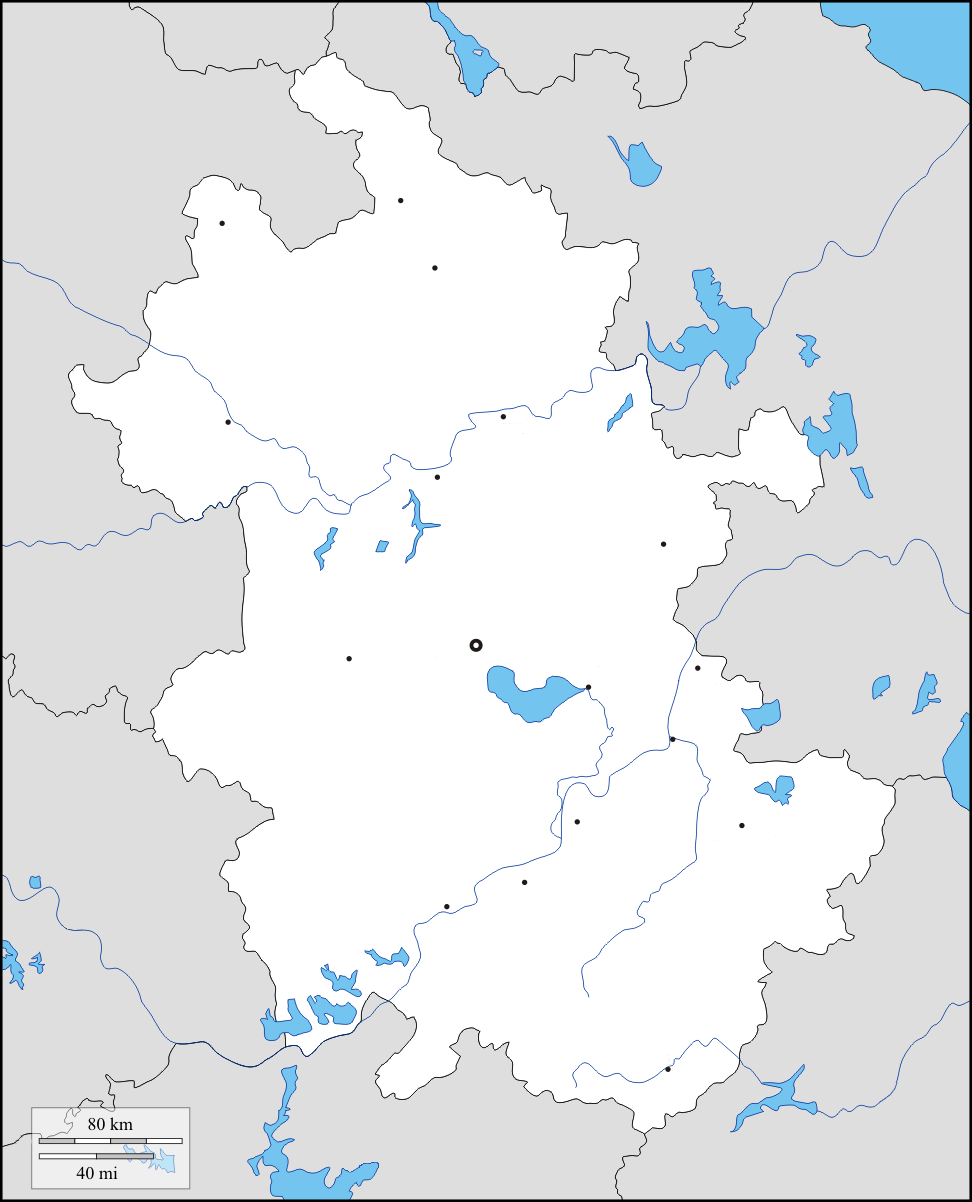
- Location within Anhui Location within China
- Coordinates: 33°11′54″N 116°21′31″E
- Country: China
- Province: Anhui
- Prefecture-level city: Bozhou
- County: Lixin County

Area
  - Total: 16 km^{2} (6.2 sq mi)
- Elevation: 28 m (92 ft)

Population (2000)
  - Total: 49,712
  - Density: 3,100/km^{2} (8,000/sq mi)
- Time zone: UTC+8 (China Standard)
- Postal code: 236700
- Area code: 0558

Wangtuan (Chinese: 望疃; pinyin: Wàngtuǎn) is a town located at the east tip of Lixin County, northwestern Anhui province, East China, bordering Mengcheng County.
