= Wangtuan =

Wangtuan could refer to the following places in China:

- Wangtuan, Lixin County (望瞳镇), town in Anhui
- Wangtuan, Jing County, Hebei (王瞳镇)
- Wangtuan, Wendeng (汪疃镇), town in Wendeng City, Shandong
