= Zhang Jun (economist) =

Chinese economist (born 1963)

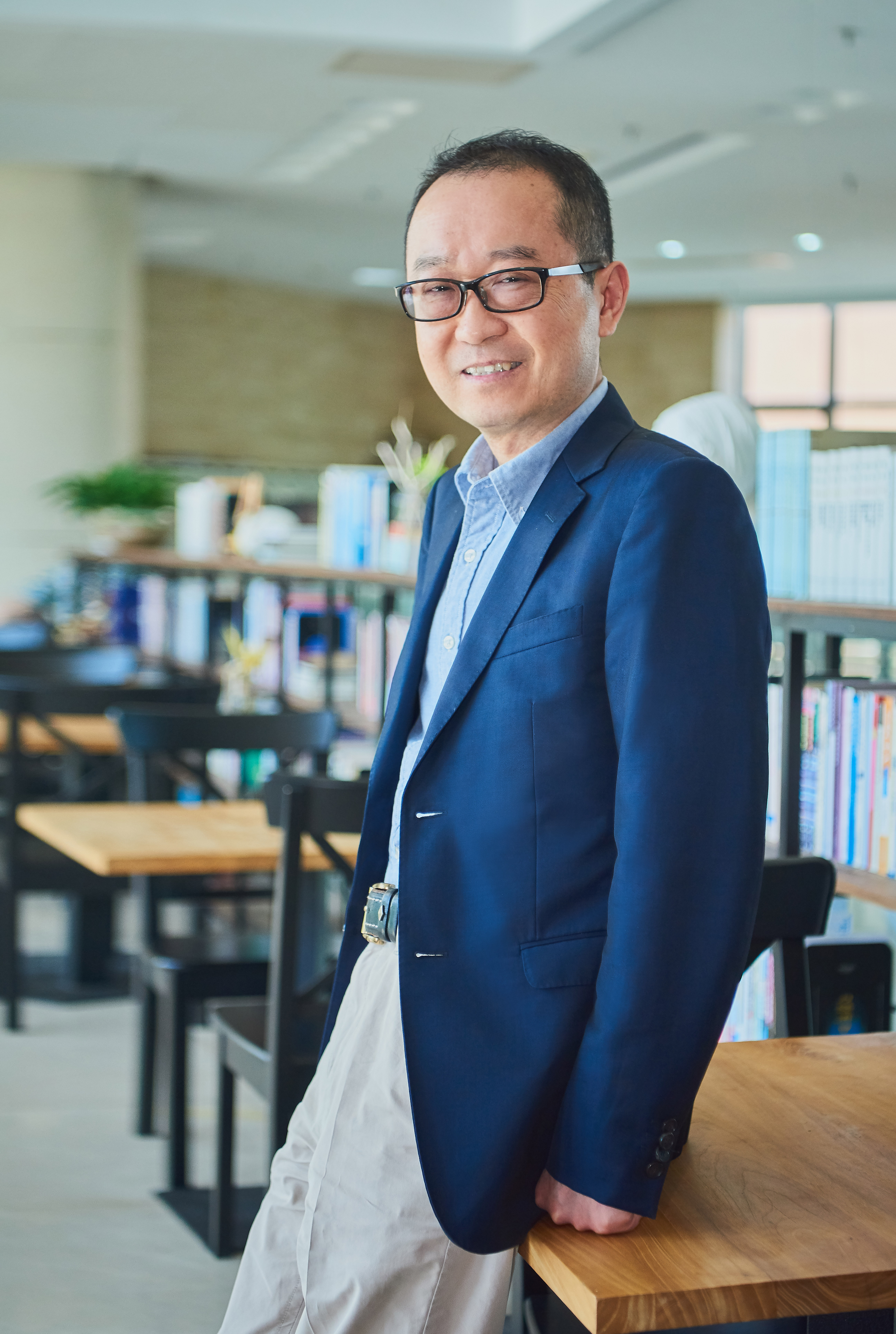
- Born: January 26, 1963 (age 63); China
- Spouse: Shelley

Academic background
- Education: Fudan University BSc; Fudan University MA; Fudan University PhD

Academic work
- Discipline: Chinese Economy, Economic Growth, Economics of Transition, Development Economics, Industrial Economics, and Property Rights and Institutional Change in China
- Institutions: Fudan University

Zhang Jun (Chinese: 张军; born January 26, 1963) is a Chinese economist and currently serves as Dean of School of Economics at Fudan University in Shanghai.

== Biography ==
Zhang was born in January 1963 and has ancestral roots in Bozhou, Anhui province.

== Career ==
Zhang is the founding Director of the China Center for Economic Studies (CCES), a Shanghai-based Think-Tank for modern Chinese economy. He is also a member of special advisory committee to Shanghai Municipal Government. In July 2015, he was one of the three economists selected for face-to-face dialogue with then Premier Li Keqiang in Beijing.

Zhang also publishes widely. Recent contributions have been to The World Economy, China Economic Review, Economic Systems, Comparative Economic Studies, Journal of Asian Economics, Journal of the Asia Pacific Economy, the Journal of Chinese Economic and Business Studies, etc. In January 2018, he was rewarded the Bergson Prize by the Association for Comparative Economic Studies (ACES) for his paper published in Comparative Economic Studies in 2015. Also in 2015, along with Justin Yifu Lin and Fan Gang, he was awarded the Prize of China Economics Innovation.

Over the past 25 years he has authored or edited numerous books including Economic Transition with Chinese Characteristics: Thirty Years of Reform and Opening Up (McGill-Queen University Press, 2008), Transformation of the Chinese Enterprises (Cengage Learning, 2009), Unfinished Reforms of the Chinese Economy (World Scientific Publishing Ltd., 2013), and End of Hyper Growth In China (Palgrave Macmillan, 2016). He has been on the editorial board of about 25 academic journals including Economic Systems, Journal of the Asia Pacific Economy, East Asia Policy, Journal of Pro-Poor Economics, China Social Sciences Review, China Economic Quarterly, China Economic Journal, China: An International Journal, and editor-in-chief of Fudan Economic Papers.

== Books ==
Books written by English:

- End of Hyper Growth in China (Palgrave Macmillan, 2016)
- Wages in China: An Economic Analysis (Vol.1 and 2) (Enrich Professional Publishing, 2016)
- Unfinished Reforms of the Chinese Economy (edited by Jun Zhang, The World Scientific Publishing Ltd., 2013)
- Transformation of the Chinese Enterprises (Gale Asia Cengage Learning, 2009)
- Economic Transition with Chinese Characteristics: Thirty Years of Economic Reform and Opening Up (Vol.1 and Vol.2) (with Arthur Sweetman, McGill-Queens University Press, 2008)
- An Introduction to Market Analysis and Forecasting (Fudan University Press, 1995)

Books written by Chinese:

- Crisis, Reform and Transformation (Beijing Dongfang Publishing House, 2017)
- Race to the Top: Understanding the Mechanism of China's Economic Development (Peking University Press, 2015)
- An Economic Analysis of Wage Determination in China (Renmin University Press, 2012)
- Selected Papers of Zhang Jun (Shanxi Economic Press, 2013)
- Story-Telling of Chinese Economy (Shanghai Joint Publishing House, 2011)
- China Transformation with Characteristics (Fudan University Press, 2010)
- Economic Reform, Transition and Growth: Observation and Explanation (Peking Normal University Press, 2010)
- The Unknown Chinese Reforms (CITIC Publishing Ltd., 2010)
- Advanced Microeconomics(2nd edition) (Fudan University Press, 2010)
- Truth for Growth (Machinery Publishing House, 2009)
- Ten Papers of China Economy (Peking University Press, 2009)
- Transformation Path for Chinese Enterprises (Shanghai People's Publishing House, 2008)
- Race for Growth: The Political Economy of China Economic Growth (Shanghai Gezhi Press and Shanghai People's Publishing House, 2008)
- Transformation, Governance and Evolution of Chinese Private Firms (Fudan University Press, 2006)
- Understanding China's Economy (China Development Press, 2006)
- Capital Formation, Investment efficiency and Economic Growth in China (Tsinghua University Press, 2005)
- China’s Industrial Reforms and Economic Growth (Shanghai Joint Publishing House, 2003)
- Advanced Microeconomics (China Higher Education Press, 2002)
- Entrepreneurship, Financial Institutions and Innovation (Shanghai People's Publishing House, 2001)
- Economics of Teams (Shanghai University of Finance and Economics Press, 1999)
- Comparative Economic Systems (Fudan University Press, 1999)
- China's Economics Reforms, Retrospects and Prospects (Shanxi People's Publishing House, 1998)
- Economics of Dual-Truck System: China's Economic Reform: 1978-1992 (Shanghai Joint Publishing House, 1997)
- An Economic Analysis of Privileges (Shanghai Lixin Press, 1995)
- Modern Corporations: Theory and Experience (Shanghai Translation Press, 1994)
- Theory of Property Rights (Shanghai Joint Publishing House, 1991)

=== Selected referred articles ===
- "Asymmetric reform bonus: The impact of VAT pilot expansion on China's corporate total tax burden" (with Hongsheng Fang and Yuxin Bao), China Economic Review, 2017, Vol.46, 17–34.
- "Tax Burden, Regulations and Development of Service Sector in China" (with Hongsheng Fang, Linhui Yu, Yuanshuang), Emerging Markets, Finance and Trade, 2018, online publishing
- "The Future is in the Past: Projecting and Plotting the Potential Rate of Growth and Trajectory of the Structural Change of the Chinese Economy for the Next 20 Years" (with Liheng Xu and Fang Liu), China and World Economy, 2015, Vol 23, No.1, 21–46.
- "The Power Structure of Revolutionary Organizations and Political Transition" (with Guangzhen Guo and Yuan Li), Journal of Chinese Economic and Business Studies, 2016, Vol.14, no.1, 1–18.
- "Re-estimating Chinas' Underestimated Consumption" (with Tian Zhu), Comparative Economic Studies, 2015, Vol.57, no.1, 55–74.
- "Zhu Rongji Might Be Right: Understanding the Mechanism of China's Fast Economic Development", The World Economy, 2012, Vol.35, no.12, 1712–1732.
- "The evolving pattern of the wage–labor productivity nexus in China: Evidence from manufacturing firm-level data" (with Xiaofeng Liu), Economic Systems, 2013, Vol.37, no.3, 354–368.
- "Guanxi and Entrepreneurship in Urban China" (with Michael Troilo), Journal of the Asia Pacific Economy, 2012, Vol.17, no.2, 315–331.
- "Structural Change, Productivity Growth and Industrial Transformation in China" (with Shiyi Chen and Gary Jefferson), China Economic Review, 2011, Vol.22, 133–150.
- "China Trade Policy Review: A Political Economy Approach" (with Changyuan Luo), The World Economy; 2010, Vol 33, no.11, 1390–1413.
- "Declining Labor Share: Is China's Case Different", China and World Economy, 2010, Vol.18, no.6, 1–18.
- "Term Limits and Rotation of Chinese Governors: Do They Matter to Economic Growth?", Journal of the Asia Pacific Economy, 2008, Vol.13, no.3, 274–297.
- "Introduction-The Political Economy of China's Robust Economic Performance", Journal of the Asia Pacific Economy, 2008, Vol.13, no.3, 255–259.
- "Estimation of China's Provincial Capital Stock Series (1952-2004) with Application", Journal of Chinese Economic and Business Studies, 2008, Vol.6, no.2, 177–196.
- "The Financial Deepening-Productivity Nexus in China:1987-2001", Journal of Chinese Economic and Business Studies, 2007, Vol. 5, no.1, 37–50.
- "Investment, Investment Efficiency and Economic Growth in China", Journal of Asian Economics, 2003, 14, 713–734.
- "The Impact of China’s Economic Development on the Global Economy", China Economist, 2009, no.18, January–February, 80–92.
- "Fiscal Expenditure Efficiency of Local Governments in China:Empirical Research on Thirty Years of Reform" (with Shiyi Chen), Social Sciences in China(Routledge), May, 2009, Vol.30, no. 2.
- "Market Size, Scale Economies, and Pattern of Loss-making in China’s State Industry", East Asian Review, 2000, no.4, March, 3-28.
- "Growth in Industrial Output in Post-reform China: Dual Pricing and Competitive Fringe", (with William Hallagan), East Asian Review, 1998, no. 2 (March), 1–17.

He has also authored over 100 research papers published in Chinese journals.

== Personal life ==
Zhang is a Chinese citizen. He is married to Shelley. They have one son.
