= Chengguan, Lixin County =

Chengguan 城关
- Town
- 城关镇
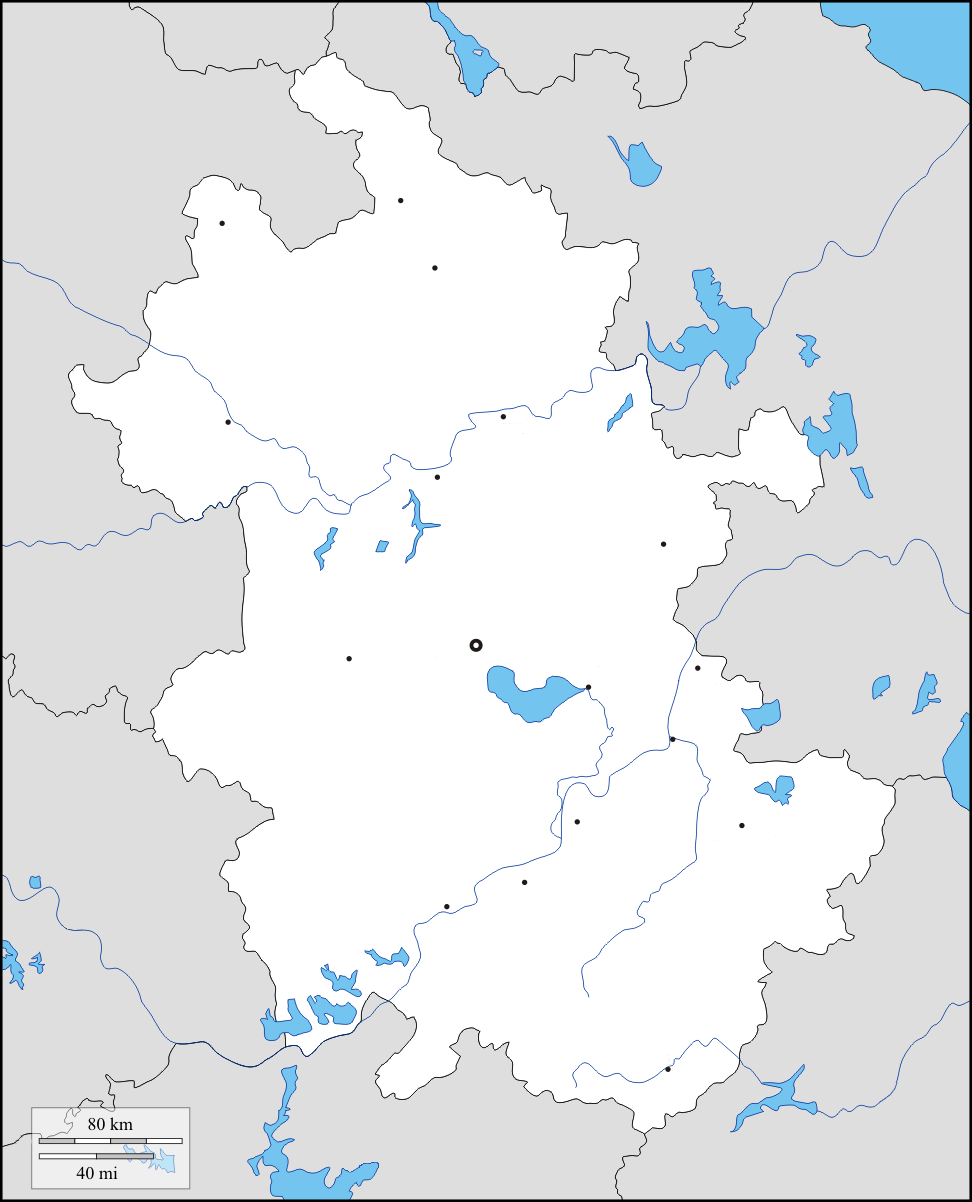
- Location within Anhui Location within China
- Coordinates: 33°08′30″N 116°12′36″E
- Country: China
- Province: Anhui
- Prefecture-level city: Bozhou
- County: Lixin County
- Elevation: 29 m (95 ft)

Population (2000)
  - Total: 46,928
- Time zone: UTC+8 (China Standard)

Chengguan (simplified Chinese: 城关; traditional Chinese: 城關; pinyin: Chéngguān) is a town and the county seat of Lixin County, northwestern Anhui province, east China.
