= Chengguan Township =

Chengguan Township (城关乡) could refer to:

== Fujian ==
- Chengguan Township, Mingxi County, in Mingxi County, Sanming

== Gansu ==
- Chengguan Township in Tianshui, Gansu

== Guangxi ==
- Chengguan Township, Luzhai County, in Luzhai County, Liuzhou

== Henan ==
- Chengguan Township, Xingyang, in Xingyang City
- Chengguan Township, Xinzheng, in Xinzheng City
- Chengguan Township, Fengqiu County, in Fengqiu County, Xinxiang
- Chengguan Township, Lankao County, in Lankao County, Kaifeng
- Chengguan Township, Luoning County, in Luoning County, Luoyang
- Chengguan Township, Shangshui County, Zhoukou
- Chengguan Township, Ye County, in Ye County, Pingdingshan
- Chengguan Township, Yiyang County, Henan, in Yiyang County, Luoyang

== Liaoning ==
- Chengguan Manchu Ethnic Township (城关满族乡), in Yi County, Jinzhou

== Shanxi ==
- Chengguan Township, Datong, in Nanjiao District, Datong
- Chengguan Township, Jiexiu, in Jiexiu City
- Chengguan Township, Shouyang County, in Shouyang County, Jinzhong
- Chengguan Township, Taigu County, in Taigu County, Jinzhong

== Xinjiang ==
- Chengguan Township, Yengisar County, in Yengisar County, Kashgar Prefecture
