= Chengguan, Mengcheng County =

Chengguan 城关
- Town
- 城关镇
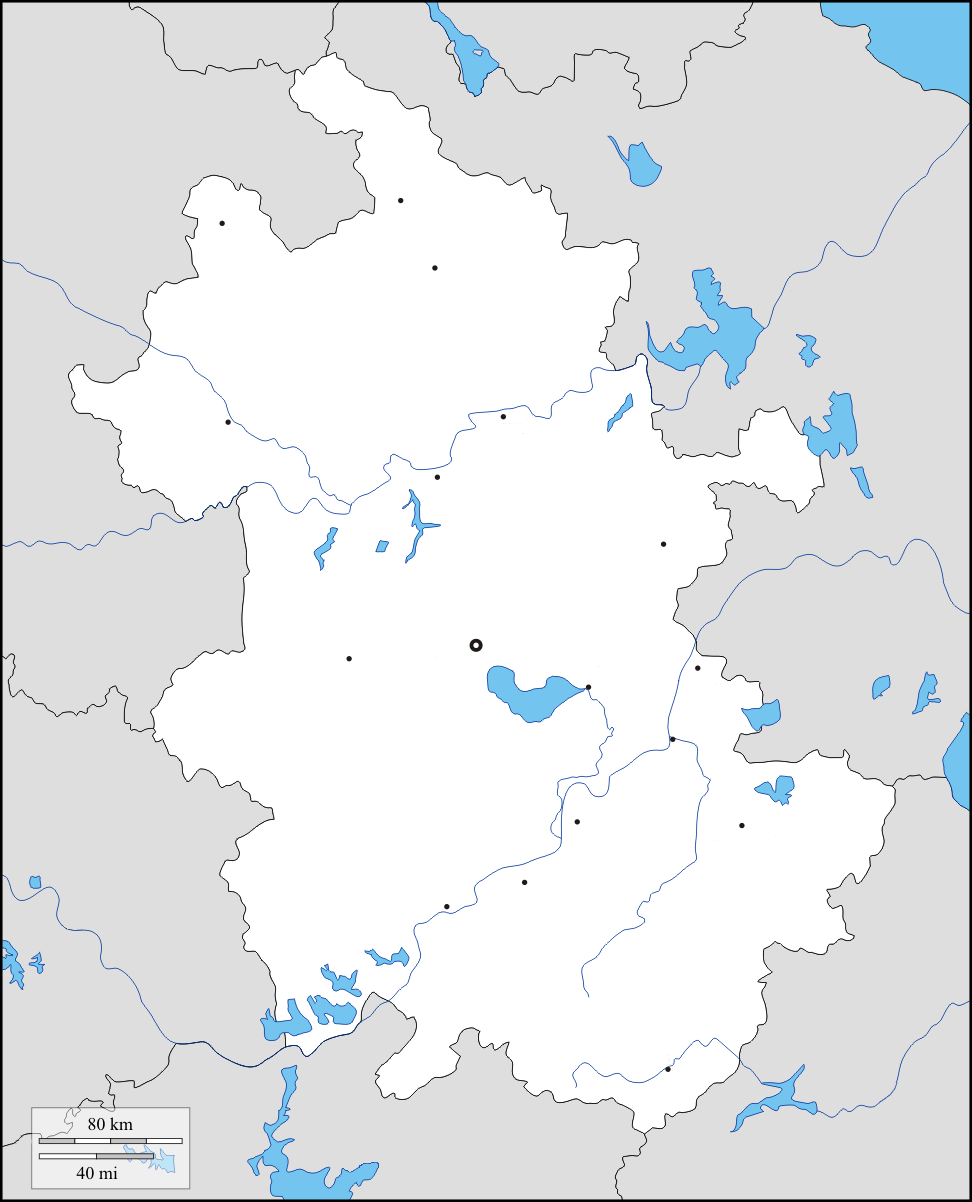
- Location within Anhui Location within China
- Coordinates: 33°15′50″N 116°33′44″E
- Country: China
- Province: Anhui
- Prefecture-level city: Bozhou
- County: Mengcheng County

Area
  - Total: 16 km^{2} (6.2 sq mi)
- Elevation: 30 m (98 ft)

Population
  - Total: 108,000
  - Density: 6,700/km^{2} (17,000/sq mi)
- Time zone: UTC+8 (China Standard)
- Postal code: 233500
- Area code: 0558

Chengguan (simplified Chinese: 城关; traditional Chinese: 城關; pinyin: Chéngguān) is a town and the county seat of Mengcheng County, northwestern Anhui province, East China.
