= Shangshui County =

Shangshui 商水县
- County
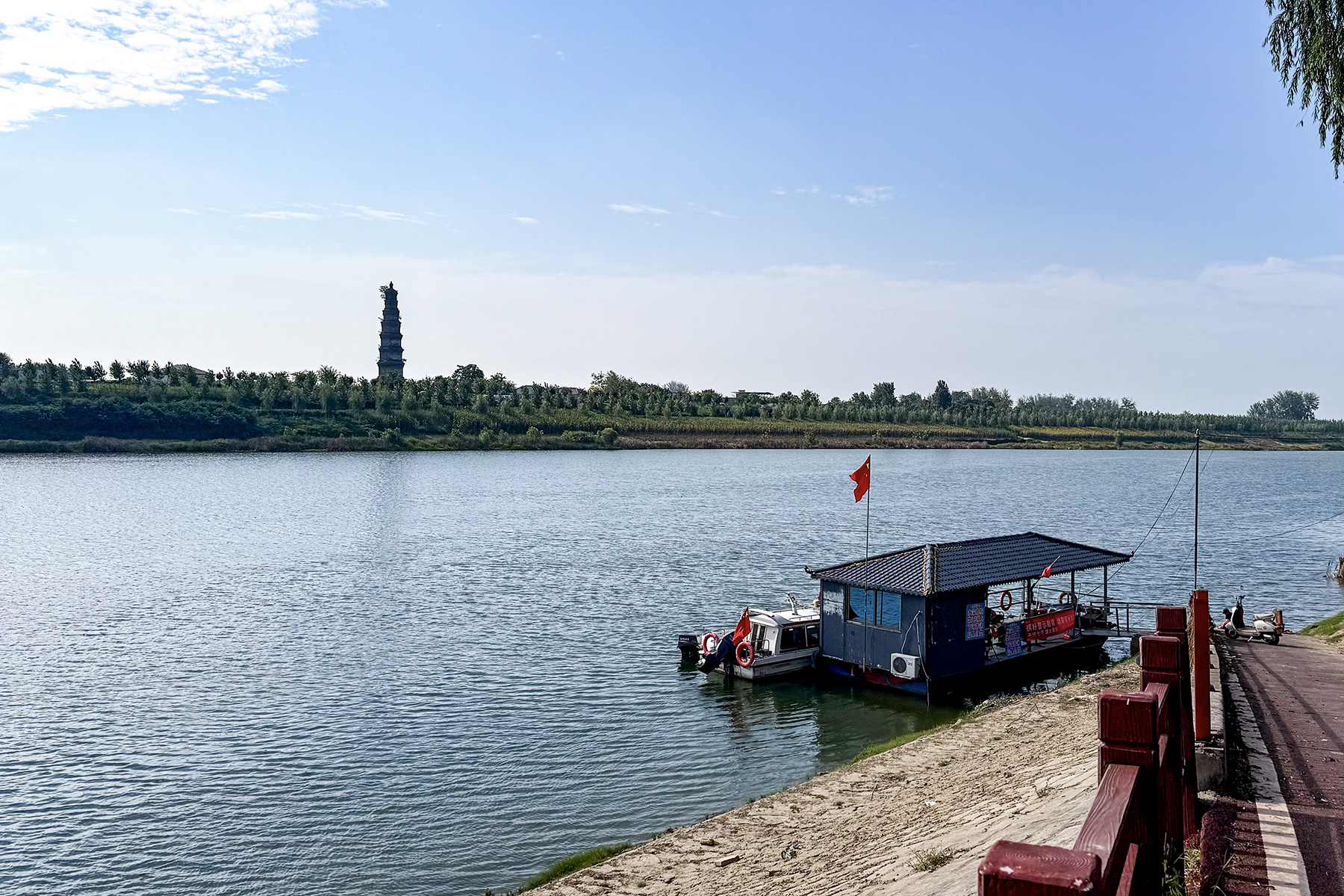

- Location of the seat in Henan
- Coordinates: 33°32′31″N 114°36′43″E
- Country: People's Republic of China
- Province: Henan
- Prefecture-level city: Zhoukou
- County seat: Chengguan

Area
  - Total: 1,325 km^{2} (512 sq mi)

Population (2019)
  - Total: 880,000
  - Density: 660/km^{2} (1,700/sq mi)
- Time zone: UTC+8 (China Standard)
- Postal code: 466100
- Area code: 0394
- Website: www.shangshui.gov.cn

Shangshui County (Chinese: 商水县; pinyin: Shāngshuǐ Xiàn) is a county in the east of Henan province, China. It is under the administration of Zhoukou city.

== Administrative divisions ==
As of 2012, this county is divided to 3 subdistricts, 9 towns and 11 townships.

Subdistricts

Subdistricts:

- Xinchengqu Subdistrict (新城区街道)
- Dongchengqu Subdistrict (东城区街道)
- Laocheng Subdistrict (老城街道)

Towns

- Huangzhai (黄寨镇)
- Lianji (练集镇)
- Weiji (魏集镇)
- Guqiang (固墙镇)
- Baisi (白寺镇)
- Bacun (巴村镇)
- Tanzhuang (谭庄镇)
- Dengcheng (邓城镇)
- Huji (胡吉镇)

Townships

- Chengguan Township (城关乡)
- Pingdian Township (平店乡)
- Yuanlao Township (袁老乡)
- Huahe Township (化河乡)
- Yaoji Township (姚集乡)
- Shuzhuang Township (舒庄乡)
- Dawu Township (大武乡)
- Zhangming Township (张明乡)
- Haogang Township (郝岗乡)
- Zhangzhuang Township (张庄乡)
- Tangzhuang Township (汤庄乡)

== Climate ==
Climate data for Shangshui, elevation 45 m (148 ft), (1991–2020 normals, extremes 1981–2010)
Month	Jan	Feb	Mar	Apr	May	Jun	Jul	Aug	Sep	Oct	Nov	Dec	Year
Record high °C (°F)	19.8 (67.6)	26.4 (79.5)	28.4 (83.1)	33.9 (93.0)	38.1 (100.6)	40.8 (105.4)	40.5 (104.9)	39.4 (102.9)	37.6 (99.7)	35.0 (95.0)	28.7 (83.7)	21.6 (70.9)	40.8 (105.4)
Mean daily maximum °C (°F)	6.4 (43.5)	10.1 (50.2)	15.4 (59.7)	21.8 (71.2)	27.2 (81.0)	32.0 (89.6)	32.4 (90.3)	31.0 (87.8)	27.5 (81.5)	22.5 (72.5)	15.0 (59.0)	8.5 (47.3)	20.8 (69.5)
Daily mean °C (°F)	1.3 (34.3)	4.4 (39.9)	9.6 (49.3)	15.7 (60.3)	21.2 (70.2)	25.9 (78.6)	27.6 (81.7)	26.3 (79.3)	21.8 (71.2)	16.3 (61.3)	9.4 (48.9)	3.2 (37.8)	15.2 (59.4)
Mean daily minimum °C (°F)	−2.6 (27.3)	0.1 (32.2)	4.7 (40.5)	10.3 (50.5)	15.7 (60.3)	20.7 (69.3)	23.7 (74.7)	22.7 (72.9)	17.5 (63.5)	11.6 (52.9)	5.0 (41.0)	−0.7 (30.7)	10.7 (51.3)
Record low °C (°F)	−15.7 (3.7)	−14.9 (5.2)	−7.7 (18.1)	−1.3 (29.7)	3.6 (38.5)	11.7 (53.1)	17.0 (62.6)	13.0 (55.4)	7.4 (45.3)	−1.2 (29.8)	−7.0 (19.4)	−14.5 (5.9)	−15.7 (3.7)
Average precipitation mm (inches)	18.0 (0.71)	21.1 (0.83)	34.1 (1.34)	42.2 (1.66)	75.0 (2.95)	102.6 (4.04)	170.1 (6.70)	126.2 (4.97)	74.3 (2.93)	47.8 (1.88)	37.7 (1.48)	17.2 (0.68)	766.3 (30.17)
Average precipitation days (≥ 0.1 mm)	5.1	5.9	6.6	6.7	8.5	7.9	11.7	10.9	8.4	7.1	6.5	5.0	90.3
Average snowy days	4.3	3.1	1.3	0.1	0	0	0	0	0	0	0.9	2.3	12
Average relative humidity (%)	69	69	69	71	71	69	81	84	79	73	72	70	73
Mean monthly sunshine hours	112.7	122.4	158.0	186.5	195.0	175.4	175.3	166.6	149.3	142.3	130.0	121.0	1,834.5
Percentage possible sunshine	36	39	42	48	45	41	40	41	41	41	42	39	41
Source: China Meteorological Administration
