= Mengcheng County =

Coordinates: 33°12′29″N 116°36′25″E

Mengcheng 蒙城县
- County
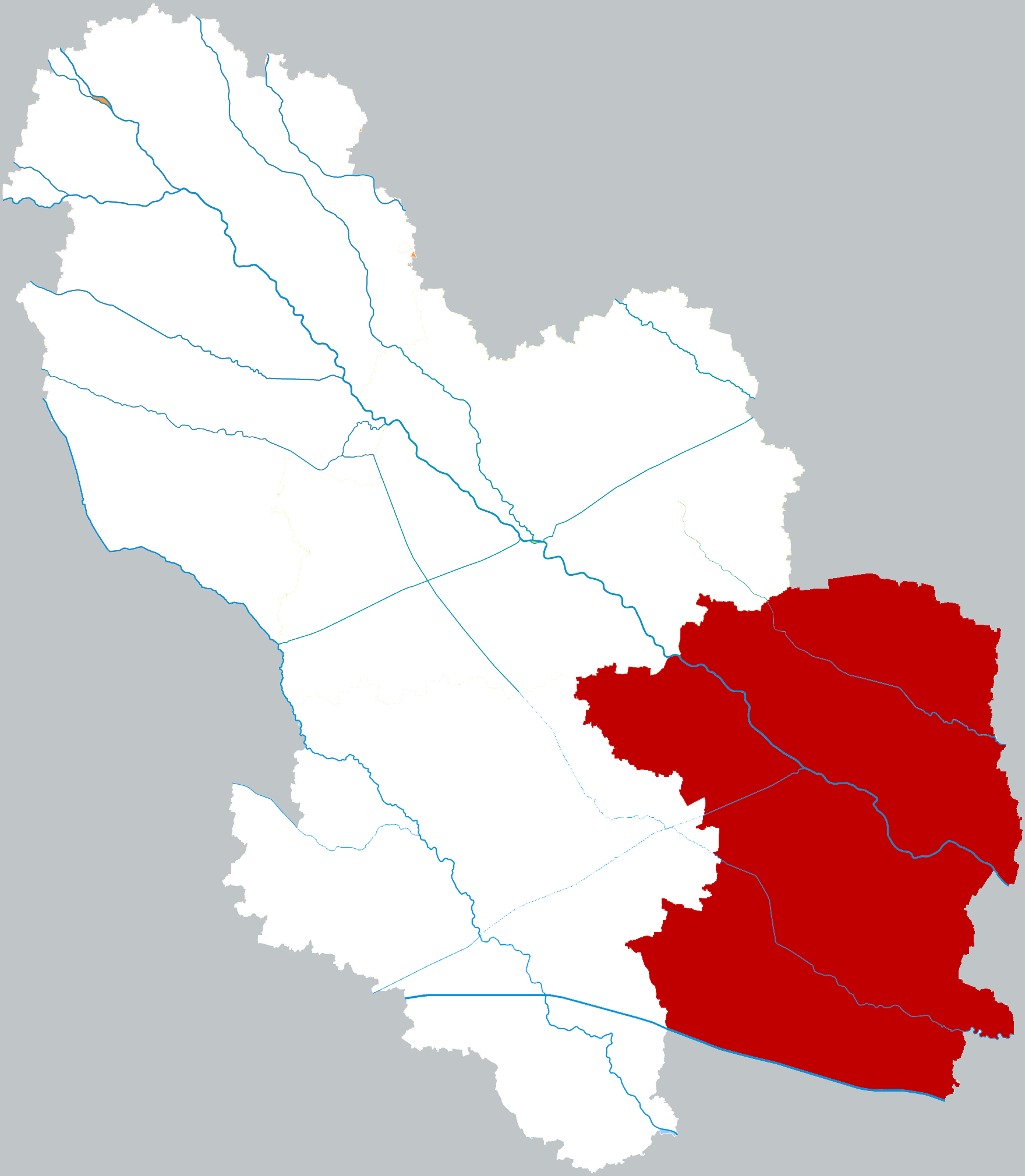
- Location of Mengcheng in Bozhou
- Country: People's Republic of China
- Province: Anhui
- Prefecture-level city: Bozhou
- County seat: Chengguan

Area
  - Total: 2,091 km^{2} (807 sq mi)

Population (2015)
  - Total: 1,394,994
  - Density: 667.1/km^{2} (1,728/sq mi)
- Time zone: UTC+8 (China Standard)
- Postal code: 233500
- Area code: 0558
- Website: http://www.mengcheng.gov.cn/

Mengcheng County (Chinese: 蒙城县; pinyin: Méngchéng Xiàn) is a county in the northwest of Anhui Province, China. It is under the administration of Bozhou city, bordering Lixin County. It is famous for its beef production and for Zhuangzi, 4th century BCE philosopher. Niu Qun, a well-known comedian, used to serve as deputy magistrate of Mengcheng County.

== Administrative divisions ==
In the present, Mengcheng County has 13 towns, 2 townships and 2 others.

13 towns

- Maji (马集镇)
- Chengguan (城关镇)
- Yuefang (岳坊镇)
- Xutuan (许疃镇)
- Tancheng (坛城镇)
- Letu (乐土镇)
- Licang ((立仓镇)
- Sanyi (三义镇)
- Chucun (楚村镇)
- Xiaojian (小涧镇)
- Shuangjian (双涧镇)
- Liba (篱笆镇)
- Banqiaoji (板桥集镇)

2 townships

- Xiaoxinji (小辛集乡)
- Wangji (王集乡)

2 Others

- Fanji Industrial Park (范集工业园)
- Baiyang Forestry (白杨林场)

== Climate ==
Climate data for Mengcheng, elevation 26 m (85 ft), (1991–2020 normals, extremes 1981–present)
Month	Jan	Feb	Mar	Apr	May	Jun	Jul	Aug	Sep	Oct	Nov	Dec	Year
Record high °C (°F)	19.4 (66.9)	26.8 (80.2)	33.0 (91.4)	34.1 (93.4)	36.8 (98.2)	39.7 (103.5)	40.8 (105.4)	38.8 (101.8)	37.6 (99.7)	34.1 (93.4)	28.3 (82.9)	21.7 (71.1)	40.8 (105.4)
Mean daily maximum °C (°F)	6.3 (43.3)	9.2 (48.6)	15.6 (60.1)	21.6 (70.9)	27.1 (80.8)	31.3 (88.3)	32.3 (90.1)	31.4 (88.5)	27.5 (81.5)	22.2 (72.0)	14.9 (58.8)	8.3 (46.9)	20.6 (69.1)
Daily mean °C (°F)	1.6 (34.9)	4.1 (39.4)	10.0 (50.0)	15.7 (60.3)	21.3 (70.3)	25.7 (78.3)	27.8 (82.0)	27.0 (80.6)	22.2 (72.0)	16.7 (62.1)	10.1 (50.2)	3.2 (37.8)	15.4 (59.8)
Mean daily minimum °C (°F)	−2.1 (28.2)	0.2 (32.4)	5.1 (41.2)	10.2 (50.4)	16.0 (60.8)	20.9 (69.6)	24.3 (75.7)	23.6 (74.5)	18.3 (64.9)	12.4 (54.3)	6.3 (43.3)	−0.8 (30.6)	11.2 (52.2)
Record low °C (°F)	−14.0 (6.8)	−12.9 (8.8)	−6.7 (19.9)	0.0 (32.0)	4.9 (40.8)	12.7 (54.9)	17.8 (64.0)	14.8 (58.6)	9.5 (49.1)	0.8 (33.4)	−8.2 (17.2)	−15.9 (3.4)	−15.9 (3.4)
Average precipitation mm (inches)	25.4 (1.00)	30.4 (1.20)	48.4 (1.91)	51.2 (2.02)	77.1 (3.04)	131.8 (5.19)	241.7 (9.52)	135.9 (5.35)	76.3 (3.00)	52.3 (2.06)	39.1 (1.54)	21.5 (0.85)	931.1 (36.68)
Average precipitation days (≥ 0.1 mm)	5.4	7.1	7.1	7.5	8.1	8.6	12.4	11.0	8.3	6.7	7.1	5.1	94.4
Average snowy days	3.8	2.8	1.0	0.1	0	0	0	0	0	0	0.6	1.6	9.9
Average relative humidity (%)	70	69	68	70	71	69	80	82	77	70	70	70	72
Mean monthly sunshine hours	126.4	129.7	161.6	192.2	196.7	176.7	178.5	173.6	160.4	166.0	146.7	133.7	1,942.2
Percentage possible sunshine	40	41	43	49	46	41	41	42	44	48	47	43	44
Source: China Meteorological Administration
