= Lüeyang County =

Coordinates: 32°19′N 106°9′E

Lueyang County 略阳县
- County
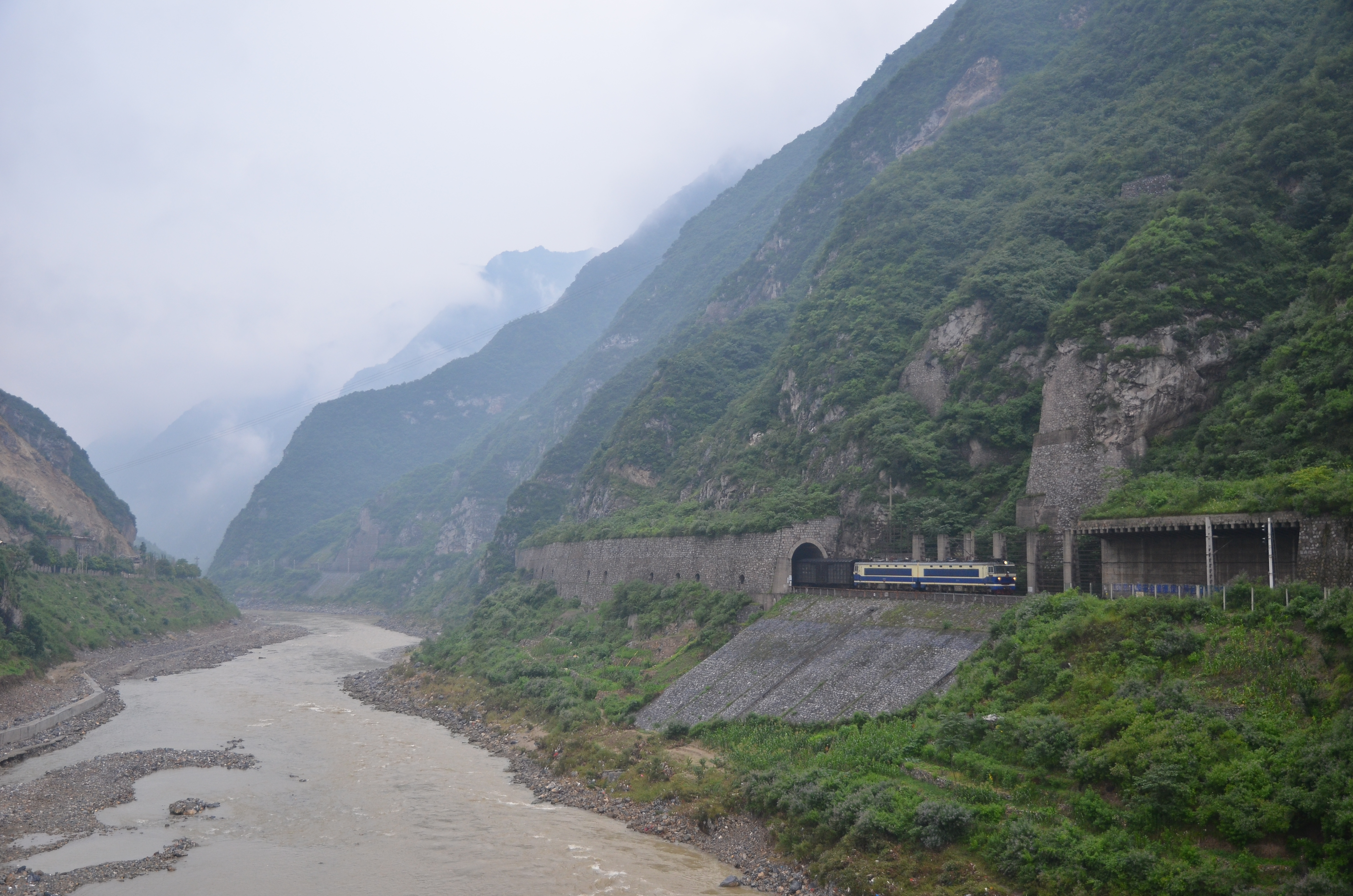

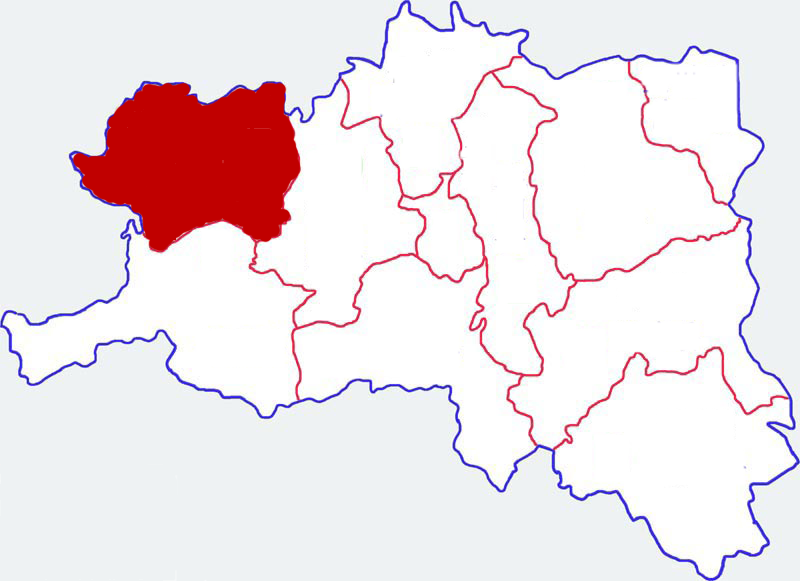
- Location in Hanzhong

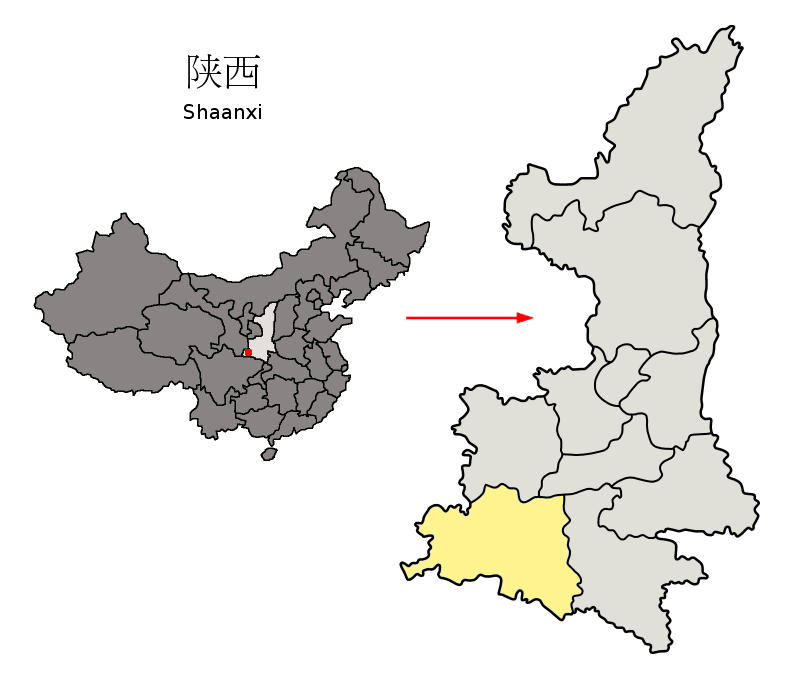
- Hanzhong in Shaanxi
- Country: People's Republic of China
- Province: Shaanxi
- Prefecture-level city: Hanzhong

Area
  - Total: 2,831 km^{2} (1,093 sq mi)
- Highest elevation: 2,425 m (7,956 ft)
- Lowest elevation: 587 m (1,926 ft)

Population (2019)
  - Total: 178,828
  - Density: 63.17/km^{2} (163.6/sq mi)
- Time zone: UTC+8 (China standard time)
- Postal Code: 724300
- Website: lueyang.gov.cn

Lueyang County, or Lüeyang County (simplified Chinese: 略阳县; traditional Chinese: 略陽縣; pinyin: Lüèyáng Xiàn), is a county of Hanzhong, in the southwest of Shaanxi province, China, bordering Gansu province to the north and west and located on the upper reaches of the Jialing River. It was first founded in 111 BC. As a result of the 2008 Sichuan earthquake, 95% of buildings in the county seat were damaged. In August 2020, the county seat was flooded by the Jialing River.

== Economy ==
Formerly home to heavy industry, nowadays the local economy lags behind the rest of Shaanxi province. In 2014, 41% of the population lived in absolute poverty. Lueyang is an important agricultural base for Eucommia tree, walnuts, black mushroom and Shiitake.

== Administrative divisions ==
As of 2019, Lueyang County is divided to 2 subdistricts and 15 towns.

Subdistricts

- Xingzhou Subdistrict (兴州街道), county seat
- Hengxianhe Subdistrict (横现河街道)

Towns

- Jieguanting (接官亭镇)
- Xihuaiba (西淮坝镇)
- Lianghekou (两河口镇)
- Jinjiahe (金家河镇)
- Xujiaping (徐家坪镇)
- Baishuijiang (白水江镇)
- Xiakouyi (硖口驿镇)
- Matiwan (马蹄湾镇)
- Lesuhe (乐素河镇)
- Guo (郭镇)
- Heihe (黑河镇)
- Baiquesi (白雀寺镇)
- Sendaiba (仙台坝镇)
- Wulongdong (五龙洞镇)
- Guanyin (观音寺镇)

== Climate ==
Climate data for Lueyang, elevation 794 m (2,605 ft), (1991–2020 normals, extremes 1981–present)
Month	Jan	Feb	Mar	Apr	May	Jun	Jul	Aug	Sep	Oct	Nov	Dec	Year
Record high °C (°F)	18.3 (64.9)	23.5 (74.3)	30.9 (87.6)	33.2 (91.8)	35.9 (96.6)	38.6 (101.5)	41.4 (106.5)	37.7 (99.9)	35.8 (96.4)	31.0 (87.8)	24.0 (75.2)	17.0 (62.6)	41.4 (106.5)
Mean daily maximum °C (°F)	7.7 (45.9)	10.6 (51.1)	16.1 (61.0)	22.2 (72.0)	25.7 (78.3)	28.8 (83.8)	30.3 (86.5)	29.5 (85.1)	23.8 (74.8)	18.7 (65.7)	13.7 (56.7)	8.8 (47.8)	19.7 (67.4)
Daily mean °C (°F)	2.6 (36.7)	5.4 (41.7)	9.9 (49.8)	15.2 (59.4)	18.7 (65.7)	22.2 (72.0)	24.2 (75.6)	23.5 (74.3)	18.9 (66.0)	13.8 (56.8)	8.7 (47.7)	3.6 (38.5)	13.9 (57.0)
Mean daily minimum °C (°F)	−1.1 (30.0)	1.6 (34.9)	5.4 (41.7)	10.0 (50.0)	13.6 (56.5)	17.3 (63.1)	20.0 (68.0)	19.6 (67.3)	15.8 (60.4)	10.8 (51.4)	5.3 (41.5)	−0.1 (31.8)	9.9 (49.7)
Record low °C (°F)	−8.9 (16.0)	−6.4 (20.5)	−5.6 (21.9)	−0.8 (30.6)	4.0 (39.2)	9.8 (49.6)	14.0 (57.2)	12.4 (54.3)	7.5 (45.5)	−2.8 (27.0)	−5.4 (22.3)	−11.3 (11.7)	−11.3 (11.7)
Average precipitation mm (inches)	4.1 (0.16)	7.7 (0.30)	22.0 (0.87)	47.8 (1.88)	75.1 (2.96)	91.2 (3.59)	174.2 (6.86)	121.3 (4.78)	119.7 (4.71)	62.5 (2.46)	17.5 (0.69)	4.1 (0.16)	747.2 (29.42)
Average precipitation days (≥ 0.1 mm)	5.1	5.5	8.1	9.1	11.7	12.0	14.3	13.0	14.0	12.4	7.3	3.8	116.3
Average snowy days	6.4	3.7	1.1	0.1	0	0	0	0	0	0	0.6	2.6	14.5
Average relative humidity (%)	64	64	63	65	70	74	79	79	83	82	75	68	72
Mean monthly sunshine hours	100.2	87.4	123.7	155.0	173.3	164.3	172.3	169.5	95.3	87.3	84.9	101.7	1,514.9
Percentage possible sunshine	32	28	33	39	40	38	40	41	26	25	27	33	34
Source: China Meteorological Administrationall-time extreme temperature

== Transport ==
- Baoji–Chengdu railway
- China National Highway 345
- G7011 Shiyan–Tianshui Expressway
