= G7011 Shiyan–Tianshui Expressway =

Expressway in China

Shiyan–Tianshui Expressway
- 十堰－天水高速公路
- Shitian Expressway 十天高速公路

Route information
- Auxiliary route of G70

Major junctions
- Southeast end: Shiyan, Hubei
- Northwest end: Tianshui, Gansu

Location
- Country: China

Highway system
- National Trunk Highway System; Primary; Auxiliary; National Highways; Transport in China
← G70	→ G7012

The Shiyan–Tianshui Expressway (Chinese: 十堰—天水高速公路), designated as G7011 and commonly referred to as the Shitian Expressway (Chinese: 十天高速公路), is an expressway in China that connects Shiyan, Hubei and Tianshui, Gansu. It is a spur of the G70 Fuzhou–Yinchuan Expressway.

== Overview ==
=== Hubei Province ===
The section in Hubei is 58.3 kilometres (36.2 mi) long.

=== Shaanxi Province ===
The 189 kilometres (117 mi) long section between Ankang and Hanzhong was opened on 27 December 2010 after a 2-year construction period at a cost of 13.77 billion Yuan.

=== Gansu Province ===
The Gansu section is 188.7 kilometres (117.3 mi) long and the investment cost was 20.621 billion Yuan. The section opened on October 1, 2015.

== Route table ==
Location	km	mi	Exit	Name	Destinations	Notes
G7011 Shiyan–Tianshui Expressway
Shiyan, Hubei				G70		Terminus of G7011
Shiyan, Hubei				Zhangwan	Jianshe Road	
Shiyan, Hubei				Huanglong	G316	
Shiyan, Hubei	Baoxia Service Area					
Shiyan, Hubei				Shiwu Expressway		Planned to open in 2021
Shiyan, Hubei				Baoxia	G316	
Shiyan, Hubei	Hubei Exia Toll Station					
Ankang, Shaanxi				Baihe	X202	
Ankang, Shaanxi				Shuanghe	X203	
Ankang, Shaanxi				Zhanghe	Zhangjin Road	
Ankang, Shaanxi				Shenhe	X306	
Ankang, Shaanxi	Xunyang Parking Area					
Ankang, Shaanxi				Xunyang	G316	
Ankang, Shaanxi	Ankang East Service Area					
Ankang, Shaanxi				Huangyanghe Interchange	G4213	
Ankang, Shaanxi				Ankang East	S207	
Ankang, Shaanxi				G69		Under construction
Ankang, Shaanxi				Ankang	G316	
Ankang, Shaanxi				Wuli	G65, G316	
Ankang, Shaanxi	Ankang West Service Area					
Ankang, Shaanxi				Hengkou Interchange	G65	
Ankang, Shaanxi				Hengkou	G316	
Ankang, Shaanxi				Puxi	G316	
Ankang, Shaanxi	Yongning Parking Area					
Ankang, Shaanxi				Hanyin	G316	
Ankang, Shaanxi	Hanyin Service Area					
Ankang, Shaanxi				Chihe	G316	
Ankang, Shaanxi				Shiquan	G316	
Hanzhong, Shaanxi				Chazhen	G210	
Hanzhong, Shaanxi	Chazhen Parking Area					
Hanzhong, Shaanxi	Parking Area					
Hanzhong, Shaanxi				Wuzizhan	G210, Xizhen Expressway (under construction)	
Hanzhong, Shaanxi	Xixiang Service Area					
Hanzhong, Shaanxi				Xixiang	G316	
Hanzhong, Shaanxi	Mazongtan Parking Area					
Hanzhong, Shaanxi				Shahe	G316	
Hanzhong, Shaanxi				Yanjing	Y005	
Hanzhong, Shaanxi				Xiejiaying Interchange	G5	
Hanzhong, Shaanxi				Puzhen	G108	
Hanzhong, Shaanxi	Hanzhong North Service Area					
Hanzhong, Shaanxi				Hanzhong North	G316	
Hanzhong, Shaanxi				Baocheng	G316	
Hanzhong, Shaanxi				Shimen Interchange	G85	
Hanzhong, Shaanxi				Xinjiezi	G108	
Hanzhong, Shaanxi				Mianxian	G108	
Hanzhong, Shaanxi				Chadian	G345	
Hanzhong, Shaanxi				Wulangping	Wuhei Road	
Hanzhong, Shaanxi	Lüeyang Service Area					
Hanzhong, Shaanxi				Lüeyang	Huilüe Road	
Hanzhong, Shaanxi	Matiwan Parking Area					
Hanzhong, Shaanxi				Baishuijiang	X221	
Longnan, Gansu				Shimen Interchange	Gansu S10	
Longnan, Gansu	Huixian Service Area					
Longnan, Gansu				Diancun	Gansu S205	
Longnan, Gansu	Chengxian Parking Area					
Longnan, Gansu				Chengxian	Gansu S205	
Longnan, Gansu				Xiaochuan	G567	
Longnan, Gansu				G8513		
Longnan, Gansu	Xihe Service Area					
Longnan, Gansu				Shixia	G567	Exit combined with Xihe service area
Longnan, Gansu				Xihe South	G567	
Longnan, Gansu				Xihe North	Gansu S219	
Longnan, Gansu				Lixian	G316	
Longnan, Gansu	Lixian Service Area					
Tianshui, Gansu				Yanguan	G316	
Tianshui, Gansu				Tianshui Zhen	G316	
Tianshui, Gansu	Qinzhou Service Area					
Tianshui, Gansu				G30		Terminus of G7011
Closed/former; Concurrency terminus; HOV only; Incomplete access; Tolled; Route transition; Unopened
