= Weigang =

Weigang is a given name. Notable people with the name include:

- Birte Weigang (born 1968), swimmer from East Germany
- Horst Weigang (1940–2024), German footballer
- Karl-Heinz Weigang (1935–2017), German professional football manager
- Pan Weigang (born 1957), also known as Tina Pan, Taiwanese politician
- Shao Weigang (born 1973), Chinese professional Go player
- Song Weigang (born 1958), Chinese water polo player
- Zhang Weigang (born 1961), Chinese sport shooter
