= Chengguan Township, Shangshui County =

Chengguan Township 城关乡
- Township
- Location within Henan
- Coordinates: 33°34′10″N 114°37′21″E
- Country: China
- Province: Henan
- Prefecture-level city: Zhoukou
- County: Shangshui

Area
  - Total: 30 km^{2} (12 sq mi)
- Elevation: 49 m (161 ft)

Population (2009)
  - Total: 35,000
  - Density: 1,200/km^{2} (3,000/sq mi)
- Time zone: UTC+8 (China Standard)
- Postal code: 466100
- Area code: 0394

Chengguan Township (simplified Chinese: 城关乡; traditional Chinese: 城關鄉; pinyin: Chéngguān Xiāng) is a township in Shangshui County, eastern Henan province, Central China, bordering the urban area of Zhoukou City. As of 2009, it had a population of around 35000 living in 18 villages, covering 30 square kilometres (12 sq mi) of land.
