= China National Highway 345 =

Road in China

National Highway 345
- 345国道

Route information
- Length: 3,000 km (1,900 mi)

Major junctions
- From: Qidong
- To: Nagqu

Location
- Country: China

Highway system
- National Trunk Highway System; Primary; Auxiliary
| ← G344 | → G346 |

China National Highway 345 runs from Qidong in Jiangsu to Nagqu in Tibet. Its exact length is not known yet, as parts of the route are still under planning, but once completed it will be around 3000 km long. It is one of the new trunk highways proposed in the China National Highway Network Planning (2013 - 2030).

== Route ==
Jiangsu

Construction on the section starting from Qidong commenced in May 2019. It is complete in Jingjiang and Taixing and under construction as a western ring road around Yangzhou.

Anhui

In Fuyang, provincial highway S102 and the Fuyang south ring road were reclassified as G345. G345 is mostly complete in Anhui.

Henan

Shaanxi

Gansu

A part of the Gansu section is relabeled and upgraded former Gansu provincial highways S305 and S307.

Qinghai

Parts of Qinghai Provincial Highway S309 were upgraded to G345. It connects to G214 at Gyêgu, leading west to Qapugtang.

Tibet

In Nagqu, G345 connects to G109.

== See also ==
- China National Highways
