= Guoyang County =

Coordinates: 33°30′31″N 116°16′13″E

Guoyang 涡阳县 Kwoyang
- County
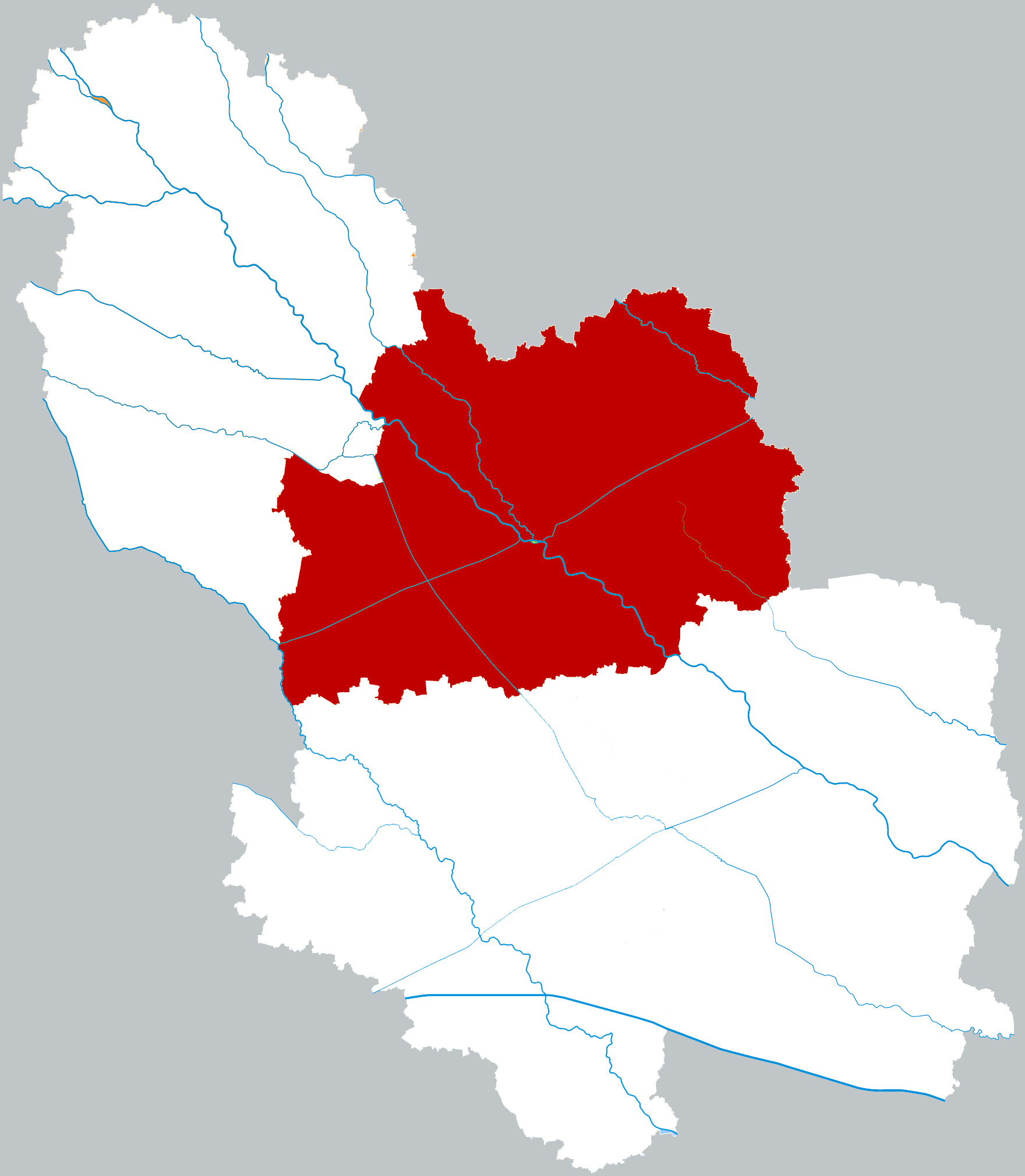
- Location of Guoyang in Bozhou
- Country: People's Republic of China
- Province: Anhui
- Prefecture-level city: Bozhou

Area
  - Total: 2,107 km^{2} (814 sq mi)

Population (2019)
  - Total: 1,319,000
- Time zone: UTC+8 (China Standard)
- Postal code: 233600

Guoyang County (simplified Chinese: 涡阳县; traditional Chinese: 渦陽縣; pinyin: Guōyáng Xiàn) is a county in the northwest of Anhui Province, China, bordering Henan province to the north. It falls under the administration of Bozhou city.

== Administrative divisions ==
In the present, Guoyang County has four subdistricts and 20 towns.

4 subdistricts

- Chengguan (城关街道)
- Chengxi (城西街道)
- Chengdong (城东街道)
- Guobei (涡北街道)

20 towns

- Xiyang (西阳镇)
- Guonan (涡南镇)
- Qingtuan (青疃镇)
- Dancheng (丹城镇)
- Shiyin (石弓镇)
- Longshan (龙山镇)
- Caoshi (曹市镇)
- Dianji (店集镇)
- Gaolu (高炉镇)
- Chudian (楚店镇)
- Gongjisi (公吉寺镇)
- Xinxing (新兴镇)
- Paifang (牌坊镇)
- Chenda (陈大镇)
- Yimen (义门镇)
- Huagou (花沟镇)
- Biaoli (标里镇)
- Linhu (临湖镇)
- Gaogong (高公镇)
- Madianji (马店集镇)

== Climate ==
Climate data for Guoyang, elevation 31 m (102 ft), (1991–2020 normals, extremes 1981–2010)
Month	Jan	Feb	Mar	Apr	May	Jun	Jul	Aug	Sep	Oct	Nov	Dec	Year
Record high °C (°F)	19.3 (66.7)	26.4 (79.5)	28.6 (83.5)	33.2 (91.8)	37.6 (99.7)	40.0 (104.0)	40.3 (104.5)	38.2 (100.8)	39.1 (102.4)	35.5 (95.9)	28.0 (82.4)	21.7 (71.1)	40.3 (104.5)
Mean daily maximum °C (°F)	6.4 (43.5)	9.9 (49.8)	15.1 (59.2)	21.6 (70.9)	27.0 (80.6)	31.6 (88.9)	32.4 (90.3)	31.0 (87.8)	27.7 (81.9)	22.6 (72.7)	15.2 (59.4)	8.6 (47.5)	20.8 (69.4)
Daily mean °C (°F)	1.5 (34.7)	4.5 (40.1)	9.5 (49.1)	15.8 (60.4)	21.3 (70.3)	26.0 (78.8)	27.9 (82.2)	26.8 (80.2)	22.6 (72.7)	17.0 (62.6)	9.9 (49.8)	3.6 (38.5)	15.5 (60.0)
Mean daily minimum °C (°F)	−2.2 (28.0)	0.5 (32.9)	4.9 (40.8)	10.7 (51.3)	16.1 (61.0)	21.1 (70.0)	24.3 (75.7)	23.5 (74.3)	18.6 (65.5)	12.6 (54.7)	5.8 (42.4)	−0.2 (31.6)	11.3 (52.4)
Record low °C (°F)	−13.9 (7.0)	−13.7 (7.3)	−7.6 (18.3)	−1.4 (29.5)	4.6 (40.3)	11.8 (53.2)	17.4 (63.3)	14.7 (58.5)	9.8 (49.6)	−1.3 (29.7)	−7.9 (17.8)	−17.2 (1.0)	−17.2 (1.0)
Average precipitation mm (inches)	20.8 (0.82)	24.7 (0.97)	38.4 (1.51)	46.4 (1.83)	69.7 (2.74)	127.4 (5.02)	208.5 (8.21)	143.1 (5.63)	68.8 (2.71)	55.3 (2.18)	38.8 (1.53)	18.6 (0.73)	860.5 (33.88)
Average precipitation days (≥ 0.1 mm)	5.1	6.3	6.7	7.0	8.1	8.1	11.9	11.7	8.4	6.6	6.6	4.7	91.2
Average snowy days	4.0	2.9	1.1	0	0	0	0	0	0	0	0.7	1.7	10.4
Average relative humidity (%)	67	66	66	68	69	67	78	81	75	68	68	67	70
Mean monthly sunshine hours	122.0	131.4	166.7	196.1	204.5	186.6	186.6	177.2	160.9	163.7	141.9	131.8	1,969.4
Percentage possible sunshine	39	42	45	50	47	44	43	43	44	47	46	43	44
Source: China Meteorological Administration
