= China National Highway Network Planning (2013–2030) =

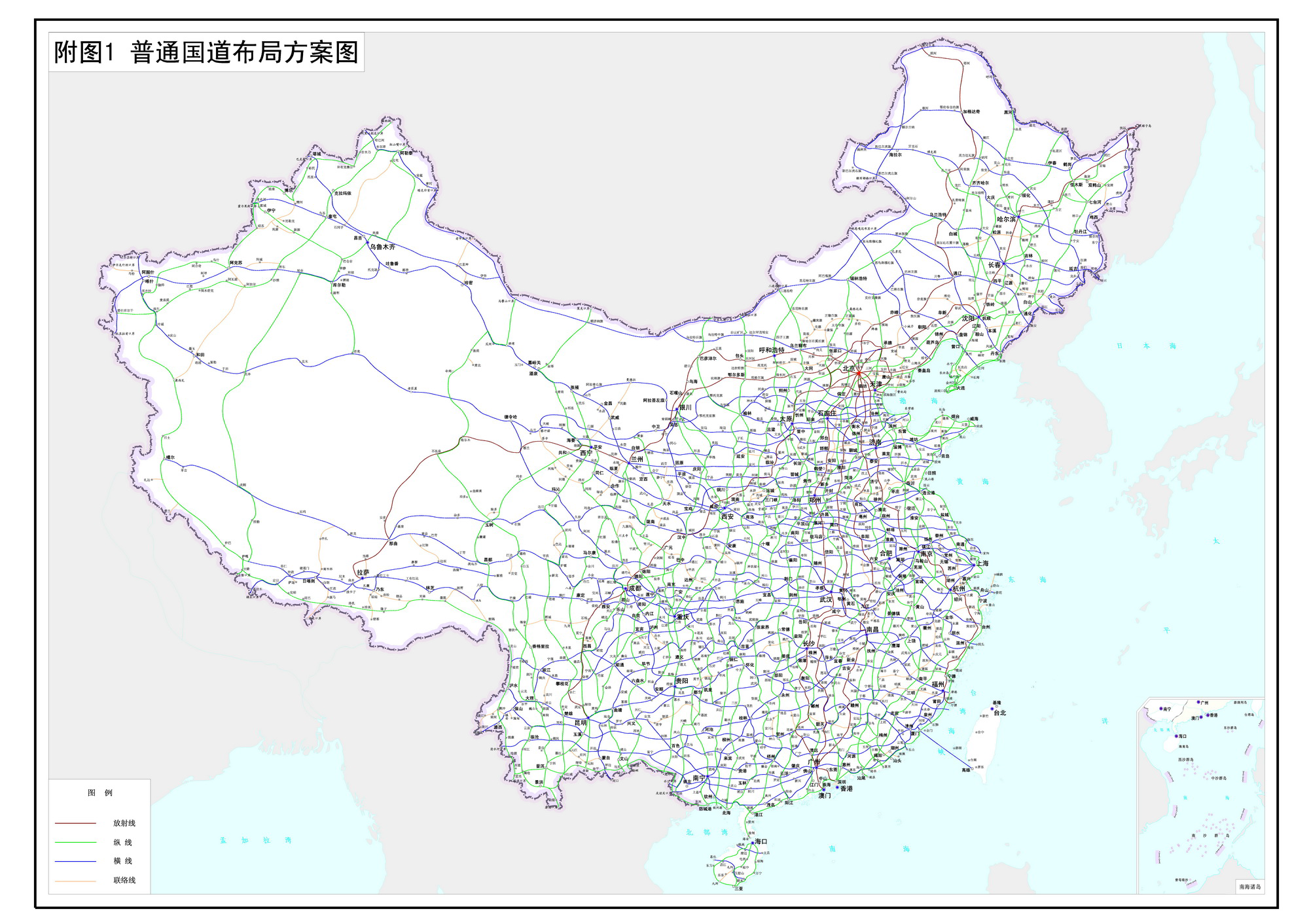
China National Highway Plan (2013–2030)

China National Highway Network Planning (2013–2030) (Chinese: 国家公路网规划（2013年—2030年）) is a plan by the Chinese Ministry of Transport to significantly expand the China National Highways network. The plan calls for the construction of 50,000 kilometres (31,000 mi) of Expressways and 160,000 kilometres (99,000 mi) of toll-free trunk highways. The expansion plans to connect every county in China by national trunk highway, and every city with a population over 200,000 by expressway. At the publication of the plans in 2013, there were still 18 such cities that lacked an expressway connection, as well as over 900 counties not connected by trunk highways. The cost of the plan is estimated at 4.7 trillion yuan ($767 billion).

A similar planning is active for connecting all provincial capitals and cities over 500,000 inhabitants by high speed railway.

== Progress ==
In October 2020 the Chinese Ministry of Transport reported that 98.6% of cities over 200,000 population had been connected by expressways. By December 2020, Zhejiang and Shaanxi reported that all their county-level divisions were connected by expressway. By December 2022, all county-level divisions of Chongqing and Guangxi were connected to the expressway network.

In December 2024, all county-level divisions of Shanxi were connected to the expressway network.
