= Bozhou =

City in Anhui, China

Bozhou 亳州市
- Prefecture-level city
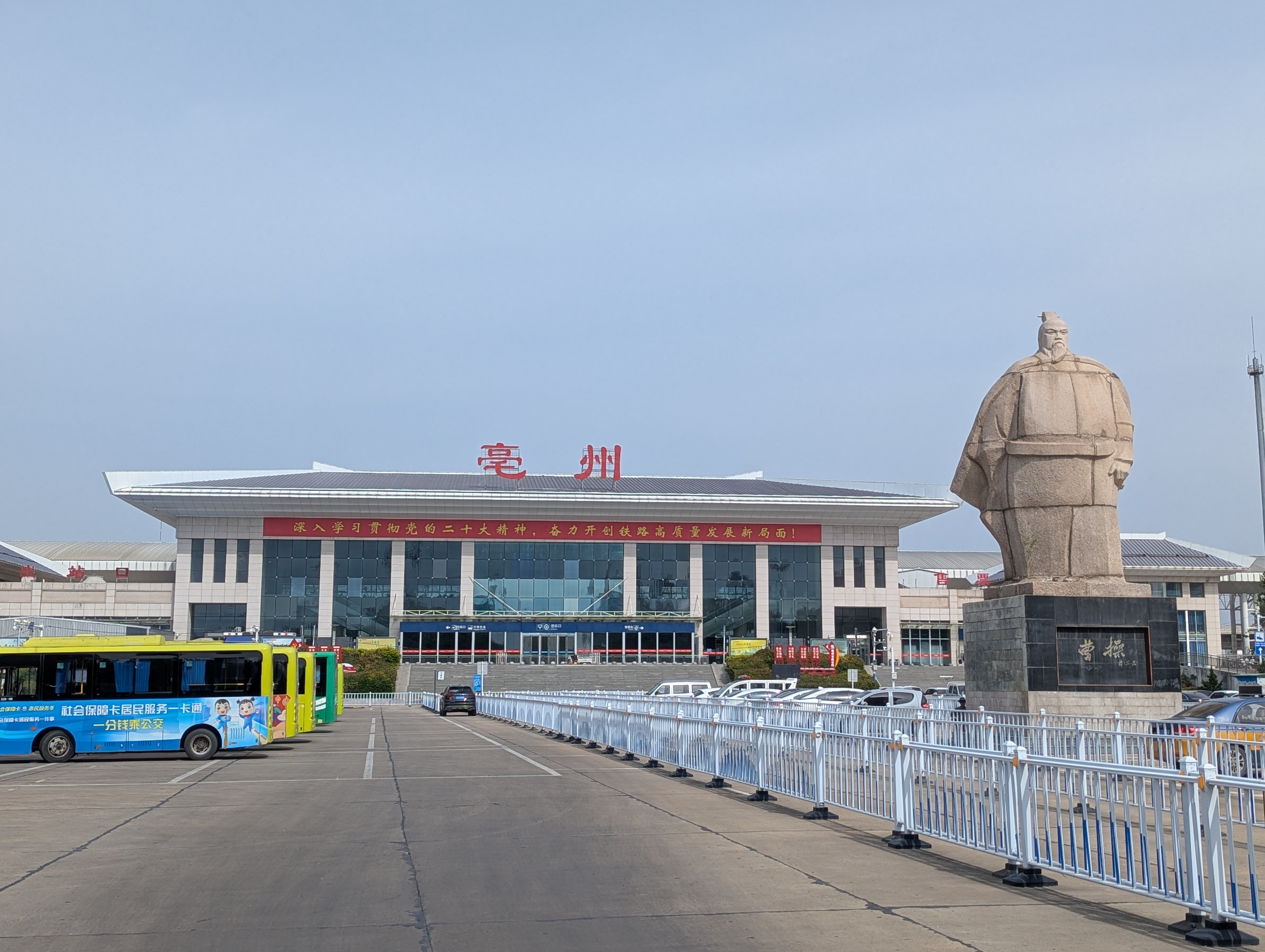
- Bozhou Railway Station

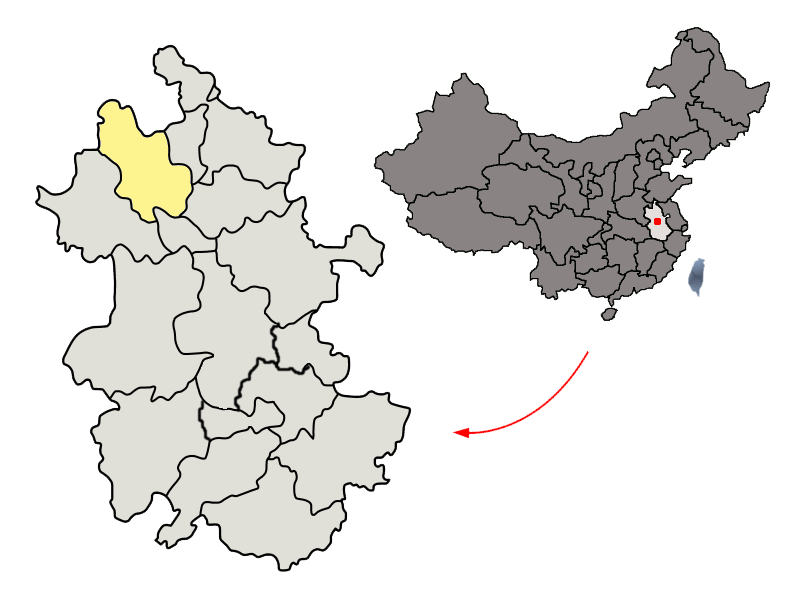
- Location of Bozhou City jurisdiction in Anhui
- Coordinates (Bozhou municipal government): 33°50′47″N 115°46′43″E
- Country: People's Republic of China
- Province: Anhui
- County-level divisions: 4
- Seat: Qiaocheng District

Government
  - Mayor: Liu Jian (刘健)

Area
  - Prefecture-level city: 8,522.58 km^{2} (3,290.59 sq mi)
  - Urban: 2,262.9 km^{2} (873.7 sq mi)
  - Metro: 2,262.9 km^{2} (873.7 sq mi)
- Elevation: 32 m (105 ft)

Population (2020 census)
  - Prefecture-level city: 4,996,844
  - Density: 586.306/km^{2} (1,518.53/sq mi)
  - Urban: 1,537,231
  - Urban density: 679.32/km^{2} (1,759.4/sq mi)
  - Metro: 1,537,231
  - Metro density: 679.32/km^{2} (1,759.4/sq mi)

GDP
  - Prefecture-level city: CN¥ 197.3 billion US$ 26.2 billion
  - Per capita: CN¥ 39,564; US$ 6,133
- Time zone: UTC+8 (CST)
- Postal code: 236800
- Area code: 558
- ISO 3166 code: CN-AH-16
- License Plate Prefix: 皖S
- Website: bozhou.gov.cn

Bozhou (Chinese: 亳州; pinyin: Bózhōu) is a prefecture-level city in northwestern Anhui province, China. It borders Huaibei to the northeast, Bengbu to the southeast, Huainan to the south, Fuyang to the southwest, and Henan to the north. Its population was 4,996,844 at the 2020 census, of whom 1,537,231 lived in the built-up area made of Qiaocheng urban district, even though the county remains largely rural.

== Administration ==
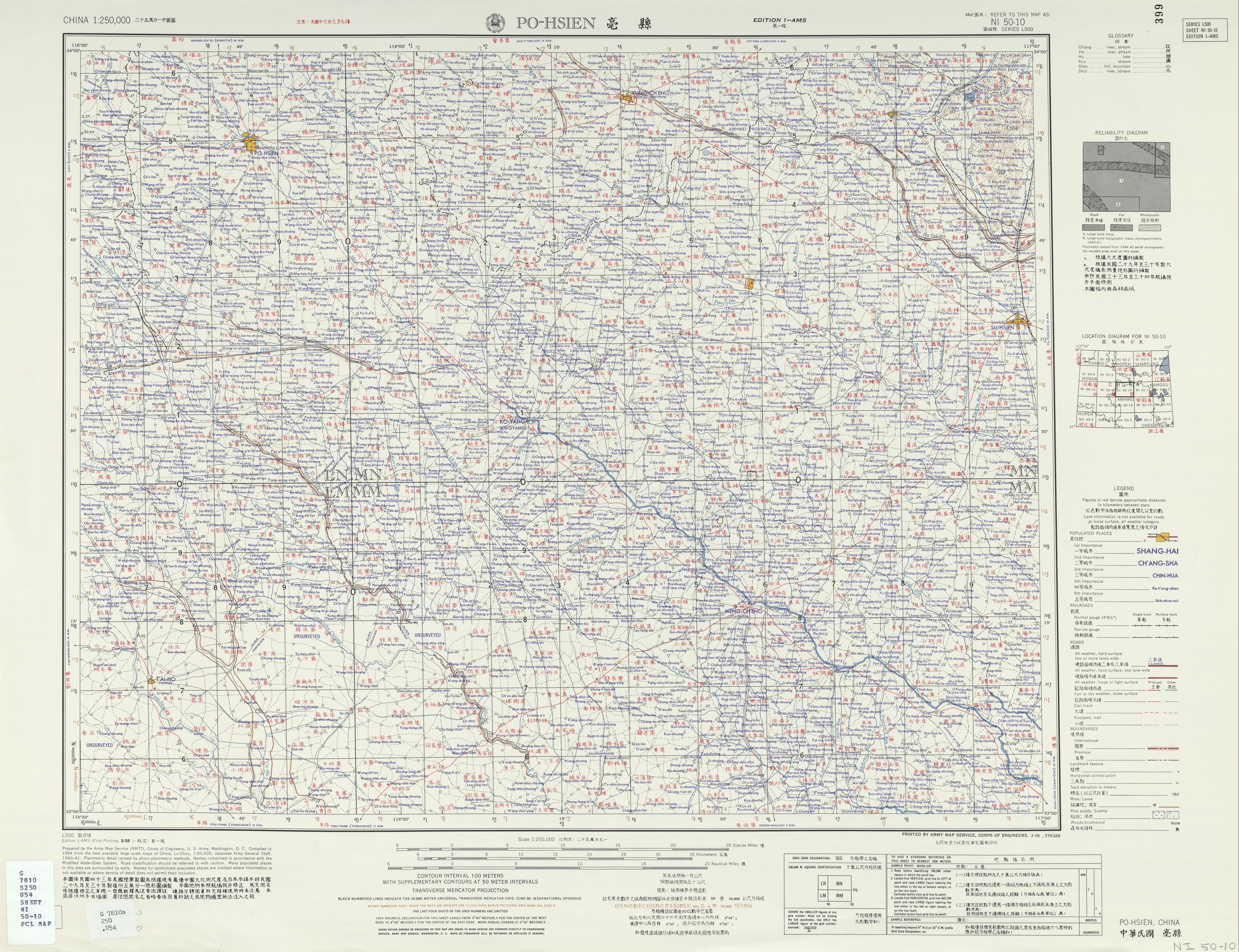
Map including Bo County (labeled as PO-HSIEN 亳縣) (AMS, 1954)

The prefecture-level city of Bozhou currently administers 4 county-level divisions, including 1 district and 3 counties.

- Qiaocheng District (谯城区)
- Guoyang County (涡阳县)
- Lixin County (利辛县)
- Mengcheng County (蒙城县)

Map
| Subdivision | Simplified Chinese | Hanyu Pinyin | Population (2020) | Area (km^{2}) | Density (/km^{2}) |
|---|---|---|---|---|---|
City Proper
| Qiaocheng District | 谯城区 | Qiáochéng Qū | 1,537,231 | 2,266 | 678.4 |
Rural
| Lixin County | 利辛县 | Lìxīn Xiàn | 1,187,254 | 2,012 | 590.1 |
| Guoyang County | 涡阳县 | Guōyáng Xiàn | 1,170,719 | 2,111 | 554.5 |
| Mengcheng County | 蒙城县 | Mĕngchéng Xiàn | 1,101,640 | 2,141 | 514.5 |
| Total | | | 4,996,844 | 8,530 | 585.8 |

== Geography and climate ==
Bozhou features a monsoon-influenced humid subtropical climate (Köppen Cwa) with four distinct seasons. With an annual mean temperature of 15.06 °C (59.1 °F), the monthly 24-hour average temperature ranges from 0.9 °C (33.6 °F) in January to 27.5 °C (81.5 °F) in August. Winters are damp and cold (yet the precipitation is low) while summers are hot and humid. Rainfall is heavily concentrated in the warmer months, as more than half of the annual total occurs from June to August. With monthly percent possible sunshine ranging from 46% in January and March to 54% in May, the city receives 2,242 hours of bright sunshine annually.

Climate data for Bozhou, elevation 39 m (128 ft), (1991–2020 normals, extremes 1953–present)
| Month | Jan | Feb | Mar | Apr | May | Jun | Jul | Aug | Sep | Oct | Nov | Dec | Year |
|---|---|---|---|---|---|---|---|---|---|---|---|---|---|
| Record high °C (°F) | 22.6 (72.7) | 26.6 (79.9) | 33.2 (91.8) | 34.9 (94.8) | 39.1 (102.4) | 41.3 (106.3) | 42.1 (107.8) | 40.6 (105.1) | 37.0 (98.6) | 36.5 (97.7) | 29.9 (85.8) | 21.1 (70.0) | 42.1 (107.8) |
| Mean daily maximum °C (°F) | 6.2 (43.2) | 9.9 (49.8) | 15.4 (59.7) | 21.9 (71.4) | 27.1 (80.8) | 31.6 (88.9) | 32.4 (90.3) | 31.1 (88.0) | 27.5 (81.5) | 22.4 (72.3) | 14.9 (58.8) | 8.3 (46.9) | 20.7 (69.3) |
| Daily mean °C (°F) | 1.3 (34.3) | 4.5 (40.1) | 9.9 (49.8) | 16.2 (61.2) | 21.6 (70.9) | 26.1 (79.0) | 27.9 (82.2) | 26.8 (80.2) | 22.4 (72.3) | 16.7 (62.1) | 9.6 (49.3) | 3.4 (38.1) | 15.5 (60.0) |
| Mean daily minimum °C (°F) | −2.3 (27.9) | 0.4 (32.7) | 5.3 (41.5) | 11.1 (52.0) | 16.5 (61.7) | 21.3 (70.3) | 24.3 (75.7) | 23.4 (74.1) | 18.4 (65.1) | 12.4 (54.3) | 5.5 (41.9) | −0.3 (31.5) | 11.3 (52.4) |
| Record low °C (°F) | −18.3 (−0.9) | −20.6 (−5.1) | −11.3 (11.7) | −3.0 (26.6) | 3.9 (39.0) | 11.6 (52.9) | 16.6 (61.9) | 13.8 (56.8) | 4.5 (40.1) | −1.2 (29.8) | −8.8 (16.2) | −17.5 (0.5) | −20.6 (−5.1) |
| Average precipitation mm (inches) | 17.5 (0.69) | 20.5 (0.81) | 31.2 (1.23) | 46.1 (1.81) | 73.1 (2.88) | 101.5 (4.00) | 203.9 (8.03) | 134.6 (5.30) | 73.4 (2.89) | 44.7 (1.76) | 35.7 (1.41) | 17.3 (0.68) | 799.5 (31.49) |
| Average precipitation days (≥ 0.1 mm) | 4.2 | 5.1 | 5.5 | 6.2 | 7.7 | 7.5 | 11.3 | 10.9 | 8.1 | 6.0 | 6.2 | 4.4 | 83.1 |
| Average snowy days | 3.8 | 3.0 | 1.3 | 0 | 0 | 0 | 0 | 0 | 0 | 0 | 0.8 | 1.9 | 10.8 |
| Average relative humidity (%) | 66 | 64 | 62 | 64 | 66 | 66 | 77 | 80 | 74 | 68 | 68 | 67 | 69 |
| Mean monthly sunshine hours | 132.4 | 137.9 | 176.4 | 203.3 | 215.0 | 199.7 | 193.8 | 181.9 | 166.6 | 166.9 | 147.9 | 136.1 | 2,057.9 |
| Percentage possible sunshine | 42 | 44 | 47 | 52 | 50 | 46 | 44 | 44 | 45 | 48 | 48 | 44 | 46 |
Source: China Meteorological Administration extremes

== History ==
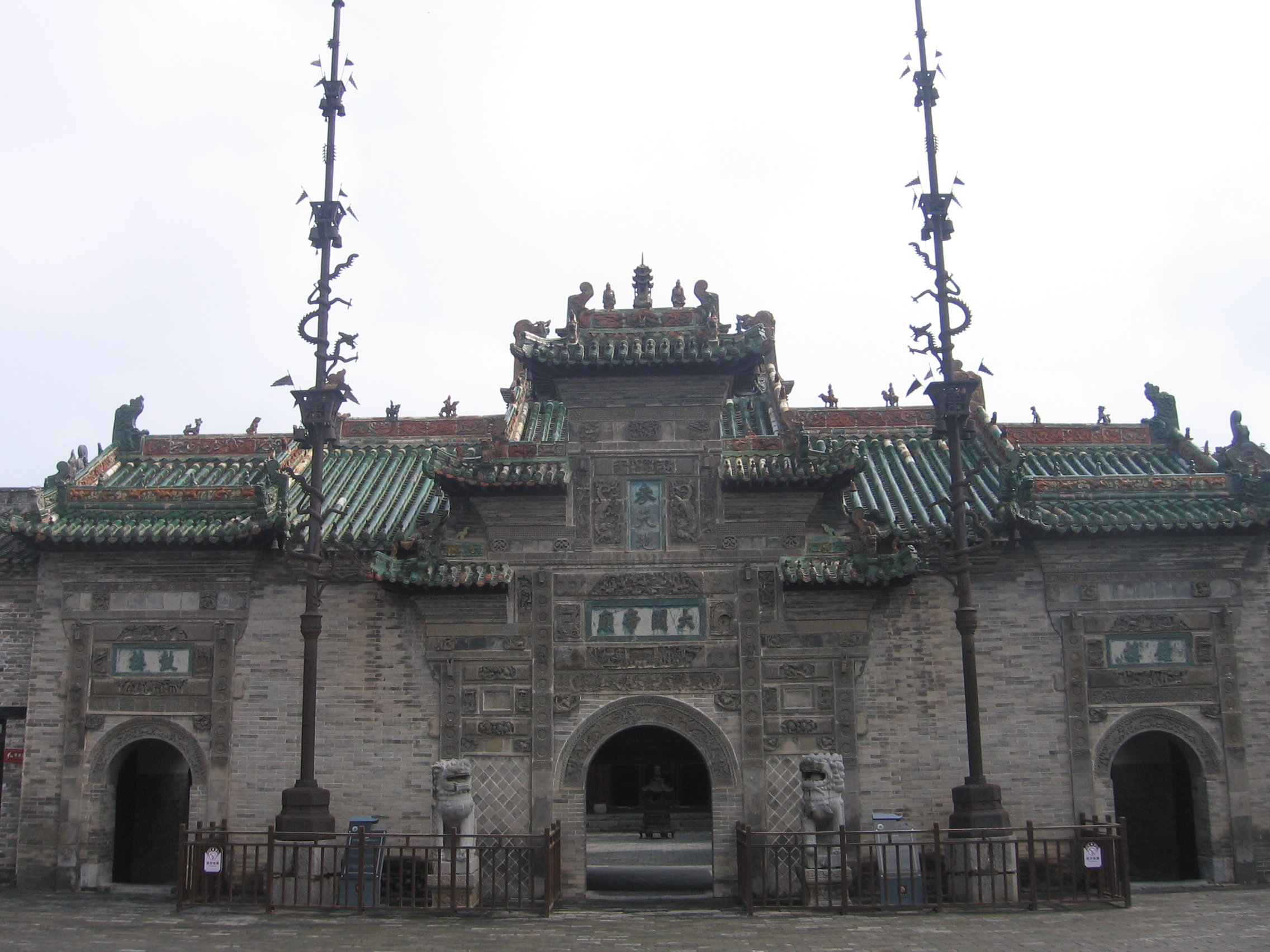
Flower Peking Opera Theater

Bozhou was, in addition to being a prefecture during the Tang dynasty, once the Qiao Commandery (Chinese: 谯郡) at the time of the Sui dynasty.

In 1355, during the Yuan dynasty, Han Lin'er (韓林兒) was proclaimed by Liu Futong (劉福通) to be the Emperor of Great Song (大宋, a reference to the extinct Song dynasty) with the regnal year Longfeng (龍鳳; 'dragon and fenghuang'). Chao was nicknamed "The Little Ming King" (小明王).

In 1368, Bo Prefecture was downgraded in status and became a county. In 1496, it was again upgraded to a prefecture/Fu then later lowered to a county in 1912 (after 1911 Revolution) when it became Bo County. In May 1986, it was upgraded to a county-level city administered by Fuyang Prefecture (阜阳地区). In 1996, Bozhou was upgraded to a provincially directly administered city (省直辖市), under the control of Fuyang City on behalf of the province. The province has directly administered Bozhou since February 1998. In June 2000, Bozhou was made a prefecture-level city.

The city is located on two main Chinese train routes running from capital Beijing to the south and from the east to Shanghai which facilitate the easy transportation of goods and people.

Bozhou's population currently stands at around the three million mark which makes it small by Chinese standards. Whilst Bozhou is currently developing and expanding, it still has few internationally recognized brands based in the city.

== Traditional Chinese medicine market ==
Bozhou is currently the capital of Traditional Chinese medicine (TCM) in mainland China, with one of the largest TCM industries and production area in the country. In 2008, companies based in Bozhou exported over 160,000 tons of products (out of total Chinese exports of 240,000 tons). Whilst relatively underdeveloped compared to coastal regions of China, Bozhou continues to be the primary location and trading hub for TCM within China. The international TCM Expo is held in Bozhou in September each year which sees delegates from around the world coming to discuss TCM.

== Notable people ==
- Cao Song, father of Cao Cao
  - Cao Cao (155 - 220), last chancellor and de facto ruler of the Eastern Han dynasty
- Hua Tuo (110 - 208 (estimated)), renowned Eastern Han dynasty physician, first inventor of general anaesthesia
- Hua Mulan, legendary heroine who disguised herself as a man in order to replace her father in the army draft
- Zhang Jun, (b. 1963), economist and professor at Fudan University
