= Feihe =

Feihe (Chinese: 淝河; pinyin: Féihé) may refer to these places in Anhui, China:

- Feihe, Bozhou
- Feihe, Hefei
- Feihe Township, Huaiyuan County

== See also ==
- Fei River (disambiguation)
