= Longshan =

Longshan may refer to:

== Counties ==
- Longshan County in Xiangxi, Hunan

== Districts ==
- Longshan District in Liaoyuan, Jilin

== Towns ==
- Longshan Town in Zhangjiachuan Hui Autonomous County, Gansu
- Longshan Town in Youyi County, Heilongjiang
- Longshan Town in Cixi, Zhejiang
- Longshan Town in Longkang, Anhui
- Longshan Town in Guoyang County, Anhui
- Longshan Town in Nanjing County, Fujian
- Longshan Town in Ju County, Shandong
- Longshan Town in Fogang County, Guangdong
- Longshan Town in Gulin County, Sichuan
- Longshan Town in Cangxi County, Sichuan
- Longshan Town in Zizhong County, Sichuan
- Longshan Town in Anlong County, Guizhou
- Longshan Town in Longli County, Guizhou
- Longshan Town in Majiang County, Guizhou
- Longshan Town in Longling County, Yunnan

== Other ==
- Longshan Temple (disambiguation), the name of five temples in Taiwan
- Longshan culture, a late Neolithic culture located on the central and lower reaches of the Yellow River

== See also ==
- Longjiang in Shunde District, Foshan, in Guangdong (formerly named Longshan)
- Long Sơn (disambiguation) (Vietnamese pronunciation of the same "龍山")
- Yongsan (Korean pronunciation of the same "龍山")
