= Miss Grand Korea =

Beauty pageant in South Korea

Miss Grand Korea 미스 그랜드 코리아
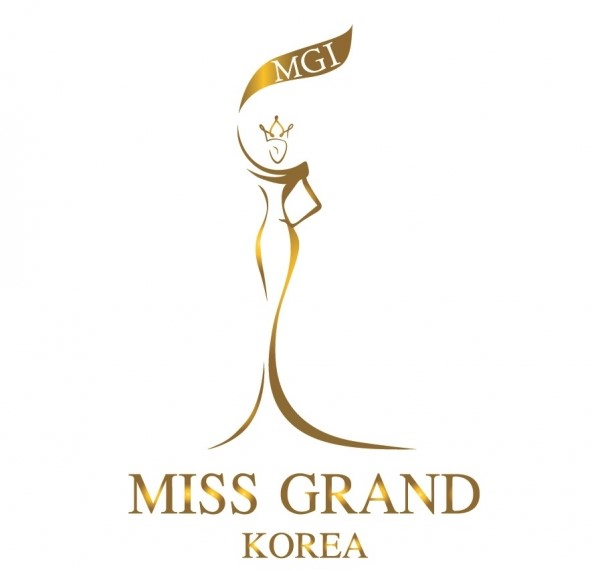
- Formation: July 6, 2017; 9 years ago
- Founder: Hyun Dae-Gon
- Type: Beauty pageant
- Headquarters: Seoul
- Location: South Korea
- Members: Miss Grand International
- Official language: Korean
- President: Choi Yoon-jung
- National director: Ho-seong Kim
- Parent organization: Miss Grand Korea Organization (2026 –present)

Miss Grand South Korea licensees timeline
Stand-alone pageant; Appointed titleholder

Miss Grand Korea (Korean: 미스 그랜드 코리아) is an annual national beauty pageant in South Korea that selects the country's representative for Miss Grand International. The pageant has been held annually since 2020.

The current Miss Grand Korea titleholder is Hyeonjin Kim of Seoul, who was crowned on July 16, 2026.

== History ==
From 2013 to 2015, South Korea's representatives at Miss Grand International were appointed from among Korean-Canadian contestants who competed in Miss Earth Canada. In 2016, the South Korean company 1L2H, led by businessman Hyun Dae-Gon, acquired the Miss Grand International franchise for South Korea. The inaugural titleholder was appointed that year, while the first national competition was held in 2017.

In 2020, the marriage bureau company Purples, in partnership with the Korea Premium Brand Association (KPBA) under the presidency of Kim Ho-Seong, acquired the South Korean franchise and organized a new national competition, which was broadcast on OBS Gyeongin TV.

Following the transfer of the franchise, a legal dispute arose between KPBA and 1L2H over the use of the Miss Grand Korea brand. The court dismissed the claims of both parties, ruling that the Miss Grand International trademark belonged to Nawat Itsaragrisil, president of Miss Grand International. It further held that only the current franchise holder was entitled to use the Miss Grand Korea name in order to avoid confusion among contestants. As a result, the former organizer rebranded its pageant as Miss Glorize Korea in late 2020.

In 2024, the franchise was transferred to entrepreneur Choo Mi-Jung, president of the Korea Beauty Pageant Organization (KBO). Beginning with the 2026 edition, the competition has been organized by the Miss Grand Korea Organization and managed by AP Communications (Anapeech).

== Editions ==
=== Date and venue ===
The following list details of the every Miss Grand Korea contest since the first one in 2017.

Year	Edition	Date	Final venue	Host Province	Entrants	Ref.
2017	1st	6 July	EL Tower (엘타워), Seocho	Seoul	27	
2018	2nd	30 August	Dinozze Convention, Seongdong	Seoul	22	
2019	3rd	12 July	Island Castle Hotel Resort, Uijeongbu	Gyeonggi	22	
2020	4th (Note: Organized by the Korea Marriage Bureau & Korea Premium Brand Association)	15 August	Grand Walkerhill, Gwangjin	Seoul	36	
2020	— (Note: Organized by the SKPBA and 1L2H Company)	22 October	Dinozze Convention, Seongdong	Seoul	12	
2021	5th	29 October	Daejeon Convention Center, Daedeok	Daejeon	22	
2023	6th	4 June	Grand Walkerhill, Gwangjin	Seoul	18	
2025 (Note: Co-organized with the Miss International Korea 2025 pageant.)	7th	20 June	Konkuk University, Gwangjin	Seoul	25	
2026	8th	16 July	Fashion Lifestyle Experience Complex, Buk	Daegu	16	

=== Competition results ===
Year	Miss Grand Korea	Runners-up				International Representatives	Ref.
Year	Miss Grand Korea	1st Runner-up	2nd Runner-up	3rd Runner-up	4th-6th Runner-up	International Representatives	Ref.
2017	Park Ha Young	An Eunsaem	Yoon Mi Kim; Jeong Suji; Kim Sona	Not awarded		Miss Grand International 2017 Park Ha Young	
2018	Choi Min	Park Nae-yeon	Kim Gwang-eun; Kim Saeb-yeol; Jung Yoo-hyun	Not awarded		Miss Grand International 2018 Choi Min	
2019	Park Serim	Moon Jinhee	Lee Dojeong	Lee Woohyun	Yoon Sumi	Miss Grand International 2019 Park Serim (DNC); Miss Global 2019 Lee Dojeong (Top 25); Global Asian Model 2019 Park Ji-soo	
2020	Oh Yuna	Lim Hyora	Lim Hayoung	Jeong Yurim	Kim Minji	Miss Global 2021 Oh Yuna &; Miss Polo International 2021 Lim Hayoung (COVID-19 pandemic, no pageant)	
2020	Lee Hyun-young	Choi Yuna	Gabin Lee	Shin Ye-eun	Lee Da-yeon; Son Ji-eun; Moon Hye-rin	Miss Grand International 2020 Lee Hyun-young; Miss Freedom of the World 2021 Gabin Lee (Asia)	
2021	Lee Jiho	Lim Seon-Yeong	Lim Ga-Yeong; Lee Hyeon-Ah	Yoon Ji-won; Park Yeon-seo; Ahn Ji-young	Not awarded	Miss Grand International 2021 Lee Jiho	
2023	Park Ji-young	Han Da-yeon	Jo Hye-min	Lee Myung-hee; Lee Na-ra	Not awarded	Miss Grand International 2023 Park Ji-young; The Miss Globe 2023 Han Da-yeon	
2025	Kim Gyuri	Lee Seohyeon	Not awarded			Miss Grand International 2025 Kim Gyuri; Miss Freedom of the world 2025 Lee Seohyeon (Dress)	
2026	Hyeonjin Kim	Lee Jin-ah; Yang Su-mi	Ahn Ha-jin; Jeong Ha-bin; Seo Yu-jin; Kim Jo-eun	Not awarded		Miss Grand International 2026 Hyeonjin Kim (DNC); The Miss Globe 2026 Yang Su-mi (Talent); Face of Beauty International 2026 Ahn Ha-jin (Top 15)	

== Representatives at Miss Grand International ==
Year	Representative	Original national title	International result		National director
Year	Representative	Original national title	Placement	Other award(s)	National director
2013	Yuri Kim	Appointed: Miss Earth Canada 2013 Participant	Unplaced	—N/a	Ronaldo Soriano Trono
2014	Sung Hye-Won	Appointed: Miss Earth Canada 2014 Participant	Unplaced	Top 19 - Best in National Costume	Ronaldo Soriano Trono
2015	Dasol Lee	Appointed: Miss Earth Canada 2015 Participant	Unplaced	—N/a	Ronaldo Soriano Trono
2016	Yeseul Cho	Appointed: Miss Intercontinental Korea 2015	Top 10	Miss Popular Vote	Hyun Dae-Gon
2017	Park Ha Young	Miss Grand Korea 2017	Unplaced	Top 25 - Best in National Costume	Hyun Dae-Gon
2018	Choi Min	Miss Grand Korea 2018	Unplaced	—N/a	Hyun Dae-Gon
2019	Park Serim	Miss Grand Korea 2019	Unable to compete		Hyun Dae-Gon
2020	Lee Hyun-young	Miss Grand Korea 2020	Unplaced	—N/a	Kim Ho-Seong
2021	Lee Ji-ho	Miss Grand Korea 2021	Unplaced	—N/a	Kim Ho-Seong
2022	Lee Juyeon	Appointed: Miss Royal Korea 2020 Mi	Unplaced	—N/a	Kim Ho-Seong
2023	Park Ji-young	Miss Grand Korea 2023	Unplaced	—N/a	Kim Ho-Seong
2024	Chang Yu-hyun	Appointed: Miss Korea Global 2023 Finalist	Unplaced	Top 22 - Best in National Costume	Kim Ho-Seong
2025	Kim Gyuri	Miss Grand Korea 2025	Unplaced	—N/a	Kim Ho-Seong
2026	Lang Sa	Appointed: 2nd Runner-up of Miss International Korea 2026	Unplaced	—N/a	Kim Ho-Seong
Color keys for the Placements at Miss Grand International Declared as the winner Ended as a runner-up (1st-5th) Ended as a finalist (Top 10) Ended as a semifinalist (Top 20) Ended as special awards

== Winner gallery ==
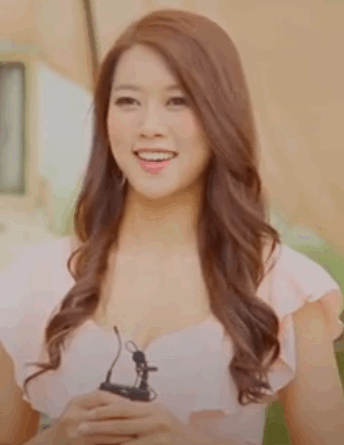
Park Ha-yeong
Miss Grand Korea 2017
(Suwon)

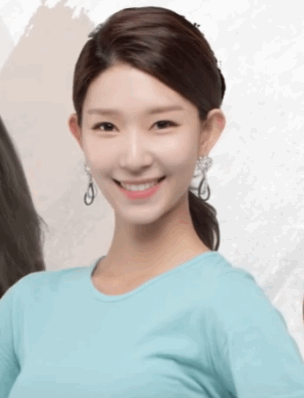
Choi Min
Miss Grand Korea 2018
(Seongnam)

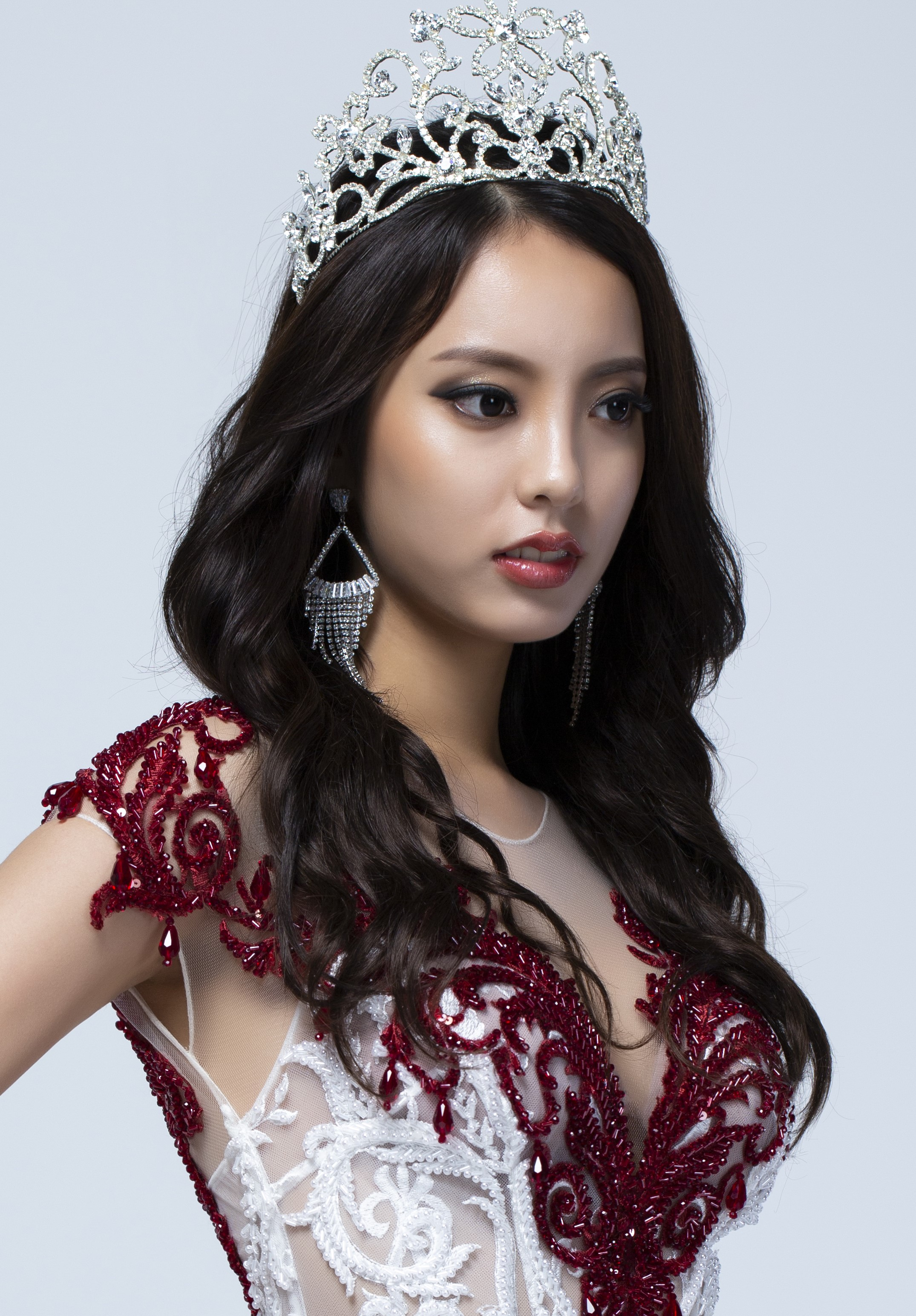
Park Serim
Miss Grand Korea 2019
(Gyeonggi)

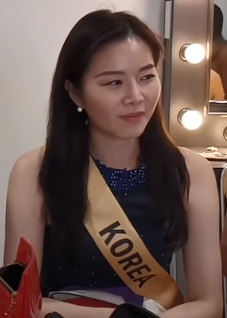
Lee Jiho
Miss Grand Korea 2021
(Seoul)

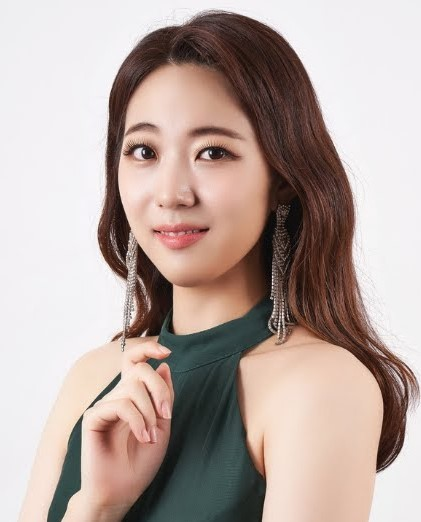
Lee Ju-yeon
Miss Grand Korea 2022
(Seoul)

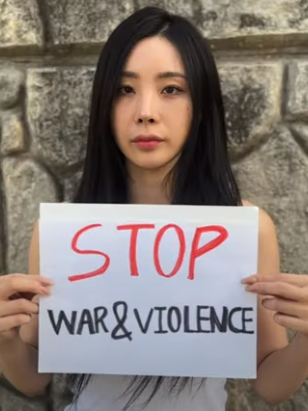
Park Ji-young
Miss Grand Korea 2023
(Seoul)

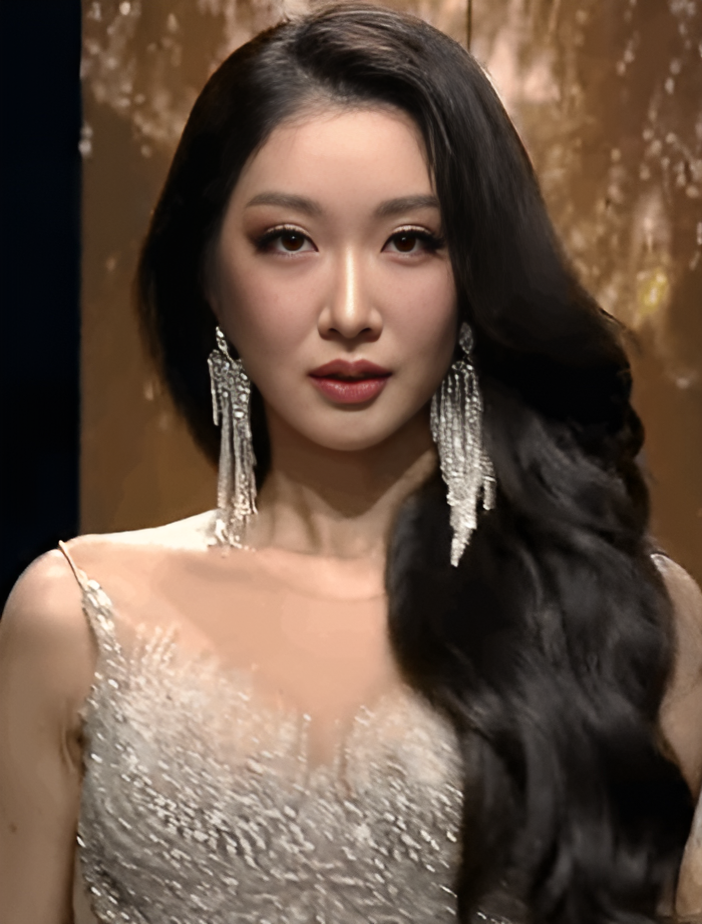
Chang Yu-hyun
Miss Grand Korea 2024
(Seoul)

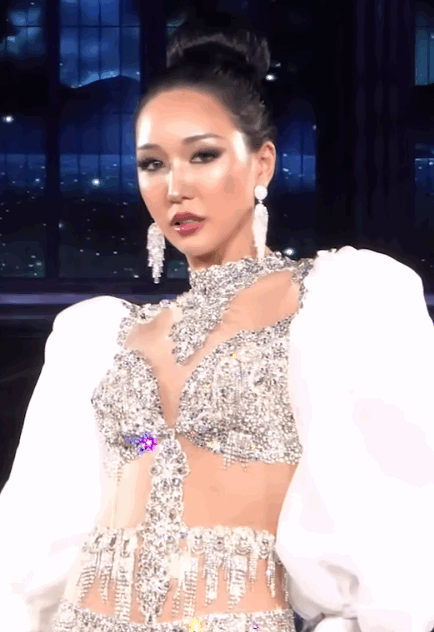
Gyu-ri Kim
Miss Grand Korea 2025
(North Gyeongsang)

== National finalists ==
The following list is the national finalists of the Miss Grand Korea pageant, as well as the competition results.

Color keys
W Declared as the winner
Ended as a runner-up
Ended as a semifinalist
Ended as a quarterfinalist
Ended as special awards winner
– Did not participate
Withdraw during the competition

Year Region	2017	2018	2019	2023
Ulsan	Jin Hye-ryeon	Han Ji-hye	Lee Yuna	Cho Hye-min (2nd)
Busan	Lee Na-hyeon	Kim Ga-eun (2nd)	Lee Ji-heun	Jeong Myeong-moon
Gwangju	An Seo-la	Kwon Min-ju	Jang So-yeoung	Choi Hae-won
Ansan	Mo Su-jin Mo	Hong Ah-li	—N/a	—N/a
Hwaseong	Yoo Soo-kyeong	—N/a	—N/a	—N/a
Uijeongbu	Kang Jisoo	—N/a	—N/a	—N/a
Siheung	Lee Hyeon-seo	—N/a	—N/a	—N/a
Seoul	Kim Bitnal Yoonmi (2nd)	Kim Saeb-yeol (2nd)	Yoon Su-mi (4th)	Park Ji-young (W)
Sejong	Kim Suji	Kim Su-min	Kang Bo-mi	Shin Ye-ji
Goyang	Kim Da-jeong	Park Na-yeon (1st)	Lee Do-jeong (2nd)	Dahye Park
Gangwon	Jeong Suji (2nd)	Lee Mee-hee	Lee Woo-hyun (3rd)	Hong Ji-yoon
Namyangju	Ahn Eun-saem (1st)	—N/a	Choi Dabin	—N/a
Yongin	Moon Hee-seon	Lim Min-ji	—N/a	Jeong Hye-bin
Anyang	Kim Joori	Shin Hye-rim	Hwang Jeong-eun	—N/a
Daegu	Kim So-na (2nd)	Jeong Yu-hyeon (2nd)	Yoo Ha-kyung	Lee Hyo-joo
North Jeolla	Koo Bo-na	Ahn Su-hee	Lim Sujin	Lee Na-ra (3rd)
North Gyeongsang	Kim Ja-hyeon	Go Eun-byeol	Shin Soo-in	Hwang Ha-jae
North Chungcheong	Park Myeong-ji	Park Seo-ha	Park Ji-soo	Park Ji-yeon
Incheon	Lee Yuna	Jeon Seul-ah	Kim Seon-young	Jo Ye-eun
Bucheon	Lee Eom-ji	Kang Ha-seul-lin	—N/a	—N/a
Seongnam	Kim Mi-ri	Choi Min (W)	Lim Jeong-hwa	—N/a
Gyeonggi	Kim Hyeon-ji	Kim Hyeon-ah	Park Se-rim (W)	Han Da-yeon (1st)
Jeju	—N/a	Jo Hyeon-mi	Shim Bomi	Hyein Kim
Suwon	Park Ha-yeong (W)	Yun Jeong	Kwon Hee-young	Jin Ho-jeong
Daejeon	Lee Ji-yeong	—N/a	Mun Jin-hee (1st)	Lee Myung-hee (3rd)
South Chungcheong	Lee Hanna	Jang Seo-yeon	Kim Hye-won	Yang Ji-eun
South Gyeongsang	Choi Hye-jin	Kim Hyeon-jin	Ko Eun-chae	Choi Yun-hee
South Jeolla	Yang Ji-won	Kang Su-bin	Park Yu-jin	Kim Seong-yeong
Total	27	23	22	20

Year No.	2020	2021
01	Lee Ga Bin (2nd)	Lee Jiho (W)
02	Choi Ko Ya	Ji Hyojin
03	Lee Hyun Young (W)	Lim Seon-Yeong (1st)
04	Shin Ye Eun (3rd)	Ahn Ji-Yeong (3rd)
05	Lee Ryu Kyung	Lee Ga-On
06	Choi You Na (1st)	Choi Ji-Hyo
07	Lee Da Jeong	Ahn Min-jeong
08	Lee Yang Ji	Lee Seo-na
09	Kim Seo Hyun	Kim Soo-Hyun
10	Koo Hyun Jin	Kim Bo-Song
11	Kim Han Bit	Min Chae-rin
12	Lee Da Yeon (4th)	Yoon Ji Won (3rd)
13	Gong Ra Yoon	Lee Ye-jin
14	Shin Jeong Won	Lim Ga-Yeong (2nd)
15	Moon Hye Reen (6th)	Kim Tae-rin
16	Choi Hye Eun	Choi Su-Bi
17	Lee Kyu Yeon	Park Ji-seon
18	Shin You Bin	Lee Su-Young
19	Han Hyun Hee	Park Yeon-seo (3rd)
20	Son Ji Eun (5th)	Jeong Hye-won
21	Yoon Hye Jin	Park Su-jin
22	Kim Ria	Lee Hyun-Ah (2nd)
23	Yu Ji Yoon	—N/a
24	Kim Yoon Jin	—N/a
25	Shin Yi Won	—N/a
26	Han Na Hee	—N/a
27	Bang So Yun	—N/a
28	Park Sang Hee	—N/a
29	Koo Young Seul	—N/a
30	Jung So Young	—N/a
31	Choi Seung Hee	—N/a
32	Park Saet Byeol	—N/a
33	Seo Sol Bin	—N/a
34	Jeon Chae Hyun	—N/a
35	Yu Jae Sook	—N/a
36	Lee Na Ra	—N/a
Total	36	22

== See also ==
- Miss Grand International
- Miss Korea
- Miss Queen Korea
- Mister World Korea
- Mister International Korea
- Miss Earth Korea
- Miss International Korea
- Miss Universe Korea Representative
- Miss and Mister World Korea
- Miss and Mister Supranational Korea
