= WABU =

WABU may refer to:

- Wabu Lake, a freshwater lake in Anhui Province, China
- Wabu High School, a high school in Namyangju, Gyeonggi, South Korea
- WBPX-TV, a television station (channel 22 digital/68 virtual) licensed to Boston, Massachusetts, United States, which held the call sign WABU from 1993 to 1999
- WJCU, a radio station (88.7 FM) licensed to University Heights, Ohio, United States, which held the call sign WABU in 1969
