= Ungilsan station =

Station of the Seoul Metropolitan Subway

운길산; Ungilsan
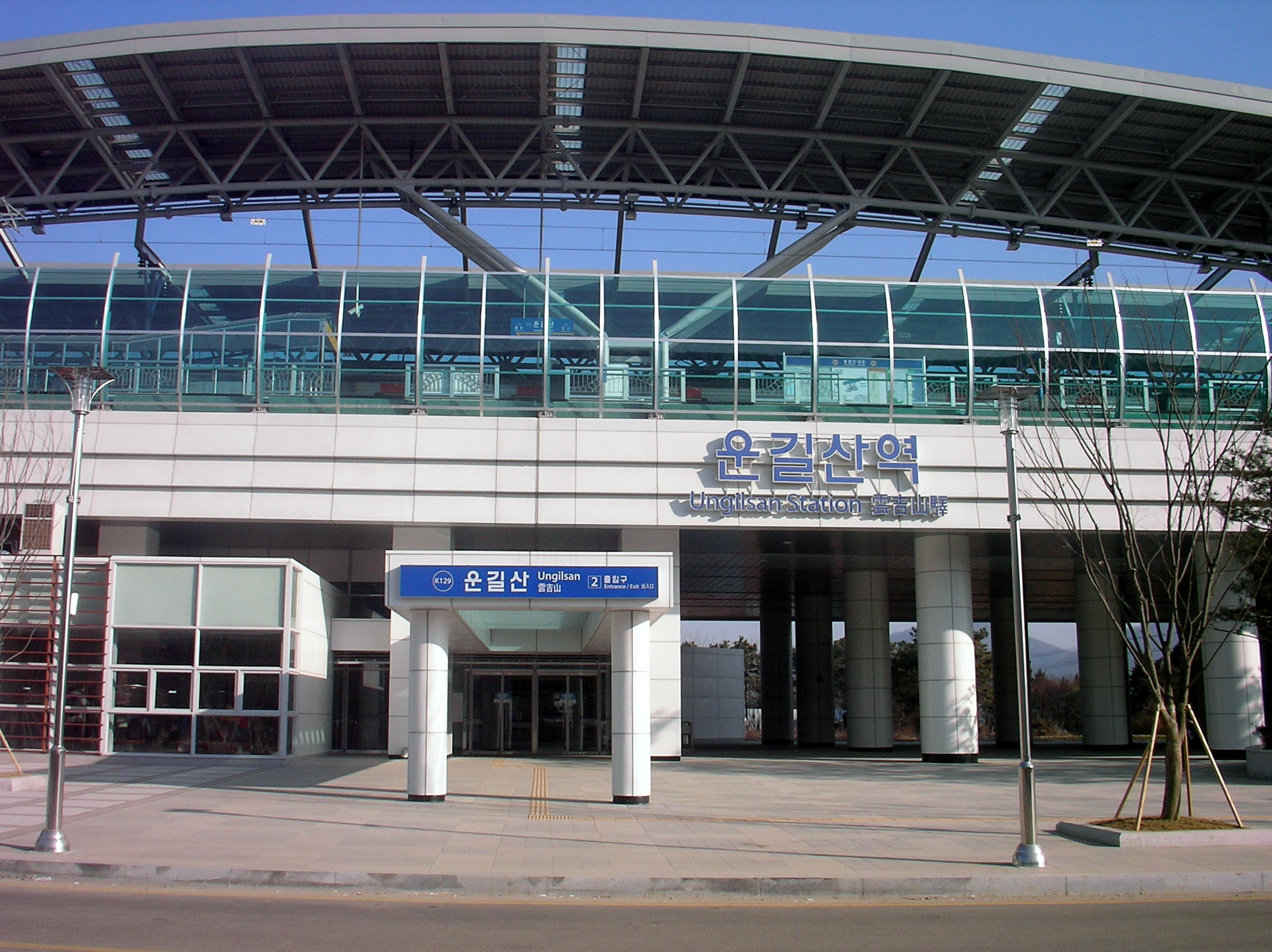

Korean name
- Hangul: 운길산역
- Hanja: 雲吉山驛
- Revised Romanization: Ungilsannyeok
- McCune–Reischauer: Unkilsannyŏk

General information
- Location: 229-1 Jinjungni, 20 Ungilsanno, Joan-myeon, Namyangju-si, Gyeonggi-do
- Coordinates: 37°33′17″N 127°18′35″E
- Operator: Korail
- Line: Gyeongui–Jungang Line
- Platforms: 2
- Tracks: 4

Construction
- Structure type: Aboveground

Key dates
- December 29, 2008: Gyeongui–Jungang Line opened
Location

Ungilsan station is a station on the Gyeongui–Jungang Line in Namyangju, Gyeonggi Province, South Korea.

Preceding station	Seoul Metropolitan Subway	Following station
Paldang towards Munsan	Gyeongui–Jungang Line	Yangsu towards Jipyeong
Paldang towards Munsan	Gyeongui–Jungang Line Gyeongui Express	Yangsu towards Yongmun
