= Miss Grand Korea 2019 =

3rd edition of the Miss Grand Korea beauty pageant

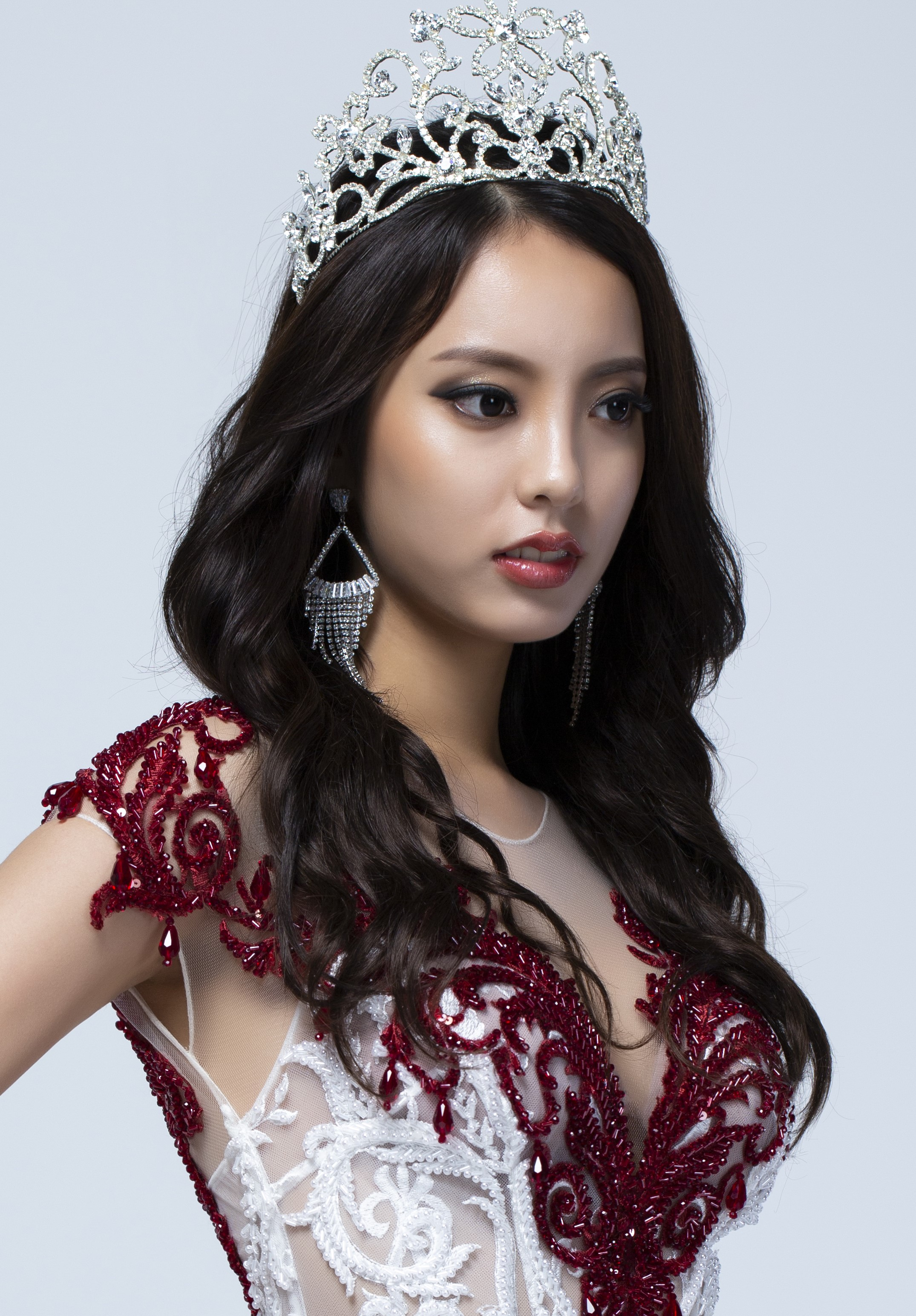
- Park Serim, the winner of the contest
- Date: July 12, 2019
- Venue: Island Castle Hotel Resort, Uijeongbu, Gyeonggi
- Entrants: 22
- Placements: 5
- Winner: Park Serim (Gyeonggi )
- Congeniality: Lee Woo-hyun (Gangwon)

Miss Grand Korea 2019 competition result by province/city
Colors key
Winner	4th runner-up
1st runner-up	Special award winner
2nd runner-up	Unplaced
3rd runner-up	Withdrew

Miss Grand Korea 2019 was the 3rd edition of the Miss Grand Korea pageant, held at the Island Castle Hotel Resort, Uijeongbu, Gyeonggi, on July 12, 2019. Twenty-two contestants, who qualified for the national contest through the regional auditions, took part in the event. Of whom, the representative of Gyeonggi, Park Serim, was named the winner (진), while Moon Jin-hee, Lee Do-jeong, Lee Woo-hyun, and Yoon Sumi, were named the first to fourth runners-up, respectively.

Originally, the winner of the contest, Park Serim, was expected to represent South Korea at the international parent stage held in Venezuela on October 25, but withdrew due to the deteriorating political situation and safety concern in the host country. Park was then sent to compete at the Miss Global 2019 pageant instead. After being unable to send a delegate to join the international contest, 1L2H Company later lost the franchise to the Korea Marriage Bureau and Korea Premium Brand Association the following year.

== Selection of contestants ==
The national finalists of Miss Grand Korea 2019 were determined through the regional auditions held by the central organ three times. The first two auditions were held in the capital, Seoul on June 6 and June 15, while another happened in Daejeon on June 22. The candidates who qualified via the audition then entered the training camp. In case of withdrawal, the remaining regional participants would be promoted as the replacements.

Host province	Date and venue	Number of qualifiers			Ref.
Host province	Date and venue	Winner (진)	Vice-miss (선)	Others (미)	Ref.
Seoul	June 6, 2019, at the Seoul Dinoce Convention	1	3	3	
Gyeonggi	June 15, 2019, at the Island Castle Hotel Resort	1	3	6	
Daejeon	June 22, 2019, at the Daejeon Yuseong Hotel	1	1	4	

== Result ==
Position	Delegate
Miss Grand Korea 2019 (진)	07. Gyeonggi – Park Serim
1st runner-up (선)	06. Daejeon – Moon Jin-hee
2nd runner-up (미)	14. Goyang – Lee Do-jeong
3rd runners-up (수)	15. Gangwon – Lee Woo-hyun
4th runner-up (려)	13. Seoul – Yoon Sumi
Special awards
Best YouTube Creator	10. North Gyeongsang – Shin So-in
Best in Swimsuit Award	20. Gwangju – Jang So-yeoung
Best in Evening Gown	04. Incheon – Kim Seon-young
Miss Island Castle	07. Gyeonggi – Park Serim
Miss Daily Korea	13. Seoul – Yoon Su-mi
Miss Money Today	10. North Gyeongsang – Shin So-in
Miss Talent	11. Jeju – Sim Bo Mi
Miss Congeniality	15. Gangwon – Lee Woo-hyun
Pure Model Agency Award	19. Seongnam – Lim Jeong-hwa
SNS Award	13. Seoul – Yoon Su-mi

== Contestants ==
Twenty-two contestants competed for the title.

No.	Province/City	Candidate	
No.	Province/City	Romanized name	Korean name
01.	Sejong	Kang Bo-mi	강보미
02.	South Gyeongsang	Ko Eun-chae	고은채
03.	Suwon	Kwon Hee-young	권희영
04.	Incheon	Kim Seon-young	김선영
05.	South Chungcheong	Kim Hye-won	김혜원
06.	Daejeon	Mun Jin-hee	문진희
07.	Gyeonggi	Park Se-rim	박세림
08.	South Jeolla	Park Yu-jin	박유진
09.	North Chungcheong	Park Ji-soo	박지수
10.	North Gyeongsang	Shin Soo-in	신수인
11.	Jeju	Shim Bomi	심보미
12.	Daegu	Yoo Ha-kyung	유하경
13.	Seoul	Yoon Su-mi	윤수미
14.	Goyang	Lee Do-jeong	이도정
15.	Gangwon	Lee Woo-hyun	이우현
16.	Ulsan	Lee Yuna	이유나
17.	Busan	Lee Ji-heun	이지흔
18.	North Jeolla	Lim Sujin	임수진
19.	Seongnam	Lim Jeong-hwa	임정화
20.	Gwangju	Jang So-yeoung	장소영
21.	Namyangju	Choi Dabin	최다빈
22.	Anyang	Hwang Jeong-eun	황정은
