= Miss Grand Korea 2017 =

1st Miss Grand Korea competition

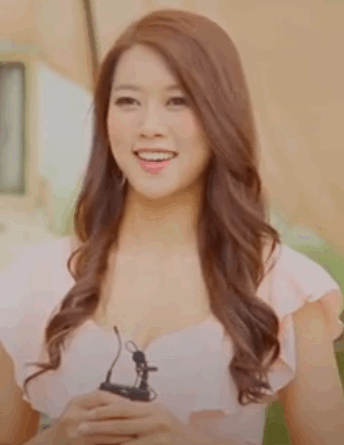
- Park Ha-yeong, the winner of the contest
- Date: July 6, 2017
- Presenters: Moon Yong-hyeon; Park Ga-hee
- Venue: EL Tower, Seocho, Seoul
- Entrants: 27
- Placements: 5
- Winner: Park Ha-yeong (Suwon)
- Congeniality: Kim So-na (Daegu)

External videos
- Final Competition Part 1
- Final Competition Part 2

Miss Grand Korea 2017 was the first edition of the Miss Grand Korea pageant, held on July 6, 2017, at the EL Tower (엘타워), Seocho, Seoul. Twenty-seven contestants from different cities and provinces of South Korea competed for the title. At the end of the event, Park Ha-yeong of Suwon was announced the winner, while Ahn Eun-saem of Namyangju was named the vice-miss. Ha-yeong later represented the country at the international parent stage, Miss Grand International 2017, held in Vietnam on October 25, but was unplaced.

The event was hosted by Moon Yong-hyeon (문용현) and Park Ga-hee (박가희).

== Background ==
After finishing the Miss Grand International 2016 in Las Vegas, Nevada, the Miss Grand Korea committee launched the regional auditions to select the finalists for the first Miss Grand Korea contest in November 2016. The auditions was organized in several provinces throughout South Korea, including Seoul, Incheon, Gangwon, Chungcheong, Daegu, Busan, and Honam.

The finalists who qualified through preliminary screenings then entered the training camp arranged from June 30 to July 5, before competing in the grand final round on July 6.

== Result ==
Placement	Candidate
Miss Grand Korea 2017 (진)	24. Suwon – Park Ha-yeong
Runner-up (선)	12. Namyangju – Ahn Eun-saem
Top 5 (미)	08. Seoul – Kim Bitnal Yunmi; 11. Gangwon – Jeong Suji; 15. Daegu – Kim Sona
Special awards
Best Talent	08. Seoul – Kim Bitnal Yunmi; 17. North Gyeongsang – Kim Ja-hyeon; 28. South Jeolla – Yang Ji-won
Best Traditional Costume	25. Daejeon – Lee Ji-yeong
Best in Swimsuit	03. Gwangju – An Seo-ra
Best Evening Gown	01. Ulsan – Jin Hye-ryeon
Best Social Media	02. Busan – Lee Na-hyeon
Miss Congeniality	15. Daegu – Kim So-na
Miss Beauty Face	10. Goyang – Kim Da-jeong

== Candidates ==
Twenty-seven contestants competed for the title.

No.	Province/City	Candidate		Height
No.	Province/City	Romanized name	Korean name	Height
01.	Ulsan	Jin Hye-ryeon	진혜련	1.72 m (5 ft 7 1/2 in)
02.	Busan	Lee Na-hyeon	이나현	1.71 m (5 ft 7 1/2 in)
03.	Gwangju	An Seo-la	안서라	1.72 m (5 ft 7 1/2 in)
04.	Ansan	Mo Su-jin Mo	모수진	1.71 m (5 ft 7 1/2 in)
05.	Hwaseong	Yoo Soo-kyeong	유수경	1.73 m (5 ft 8 in)
06.	Uijeongbu	Kang Jisoo	강지수	1.70 m (5 ft 7 in)
07.	Siheung	Lee Hyeon-seo	이현서	1.71 m (5 ft 7 1/2 in)
08.	Seoul	Kim Bitnal Yoonmi	김빛날윤미	1.68 m (5 ft 6 in)
09.	Sejong	Kim Suji	김수지	1.73 m (5 ft 8 in)
10.	Goyang	Kim Da-jeong	김다정	1.78 m (5 ft 10 in)
11.	Gangwon	Jeong Suji	정수지	1.75 m (5 ft 9 in)
12.	Namyangju	Ahn Eun-saem	안은샘	1.70 m (5 ft 7 in)
13.	Yongin	Moon Hee-seon	문희선	1.67 m (5 ft 5 1/2 in)
14.	Anyang	Kim Joori	김주리	1.65 m (5 ft 5 in)
15.	Daegu	Kim So-na	김소나	1.68 m (5 ft 6 in)
16.	North Jeolla	Koo Bo-na	구보나	1.68 m (5 ft 6 in)
17.	North Gyeongsang	Kim Ja-hyeon	김자현	1.65 m (5 ft 5 in)
18.	North Chungcheong	Park Myeong-ji	박명지	1.67 m (5 ft 5 1/2 in)
19.	Incheon	Lee Yuna	이연아	1.65 m (5 ft 5 in)
20.	Bucheon	Lee Eom-ji	이엄지	1.68 m (5 ft 6 in)
21.	Seongnam	Kim Mi-ri	김미리	1.66 m (5 ft 5 1/2 in)
22.	Gyeonggi	Kim Hyeon-ji	김현지	1.68 m (5 ft 6 in)
23.	Jeju	No data available; withdrawn contestant		
24.	Suwon	Park Ha-yeong	박하영	1.75 m (5 ft 9 in)
25.	Daejeon	Lee Ji-yeong	이지영	1.72 m (5 ft 7 1/2 in)
26.	South Chungcheong	Lee Hanna	이한나	1.68 m (5 ft 6 in)
27.	South Gyeongsang	Choi Hye-jin	최혜진	1.68 m (5 ft 6 in)
28.	South Jeolla	Yang Ji-won	양지원	1.75 m (5 ft 9 in)
