= Ungilsan =

Mountain in Gyeonggi, South Korea

Coordinates: 37°34′N 127°18′E

Highest point
- Elevation: 610.2 m (2,002 ft)

Geography
- Location: South Korea

Korean name
- Hangul: 운길산
- Hanja: 雲吉山
- RR: Ungilsan
- MR: Un'gilsan

Ungilsan (Korean: 운길산) is a mountain near Namyangju, Gyeonggi Province in South Korea. It has an elevation of 610.2 m (2,002 ft).

== See also ==
- List of mountains in Korea
