= Miss Grand Korea 2020 =

4th Miss Grand South Korea, beauty pageant edition

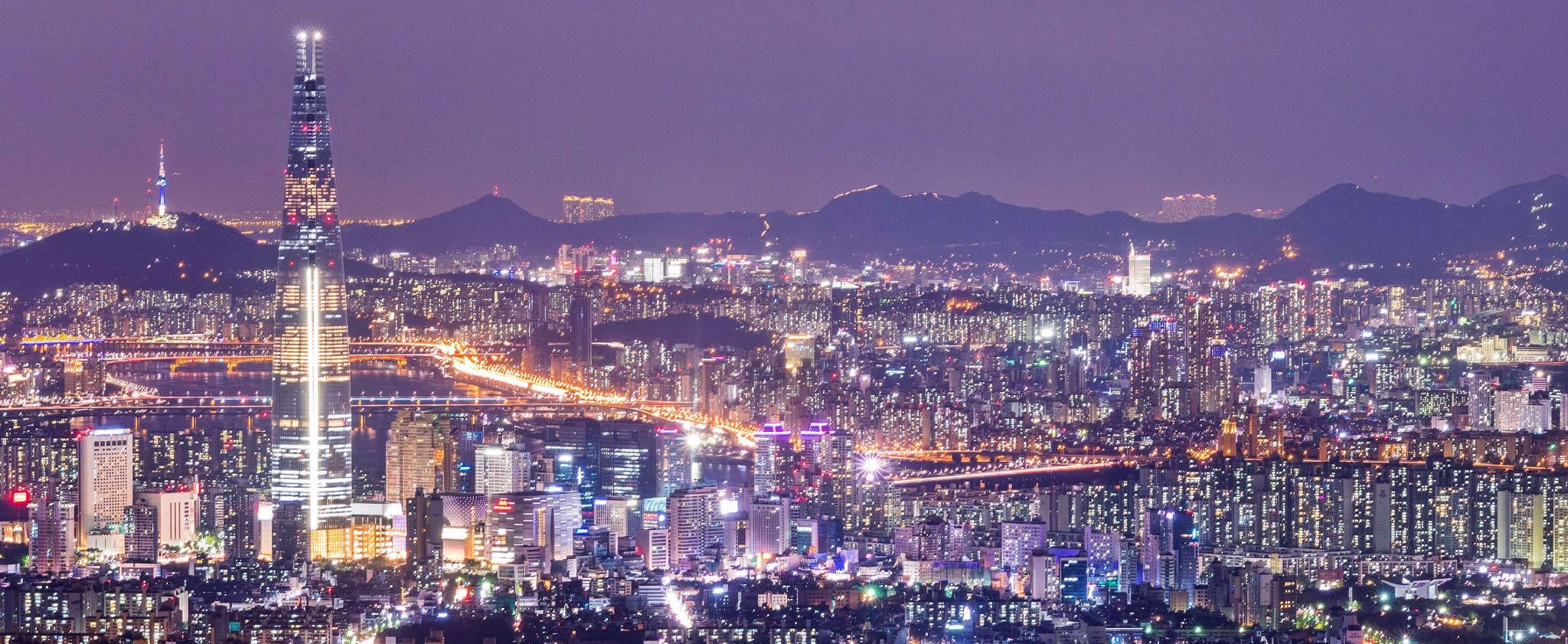
- Seoul, the host city of the contest
- Date: 15 August 2020
- Presenters: Oh Hyun-Kyung; Tony Ahn; Kim Jung-Geun
- Venue: Grand Walkerhill Hotel, Gwangjin, Seoul
- Broadcaster: OBS Gyeongin TV
- Entrants: 36
- Placements: 7
- Winner: Lee Hyun-young (Seoul)
- Congeniality: Kim Seo Hyun (Seoul)
- Photogenic: Shin You Bin (Seoul)

External videos
- Miss Grand Korea 2020 Grand Final Competition, on October 19, 2020 (Part 1), YouTube video
- Miss Grand Korea 2020 Grand Final Competition, on October 19, 2020 (Part 2), YouTube video

Miss Grand Korea 2020 was the fourth edition of the Miss Grand Korea beauty pageant, held on August 15, 2020, at Grand Walkerhill Hotel, Gwangjin, Seoul, where a twenty-five-year-old Hanyang University student from Seoul, Lee Hyun-young, was announced the winner. Hyun-young later represented the country at the Miss Grand International 2020 held in Thailand in March 2021, but she was unplaced.

The contest featured thirty-six candidates, who qualified for the national pageant via an audition held earlier in July. The grand final round of the contest was hosted by Oh Hyun-Kyung, Tony Ahn, and Kim Jung-Geun, and was live-transmitted to the audience nationwide via a free-to-air television channel, OBS Gyeongin TV.

== Background ==
After acquiring the license of Miss Grand Korea in early 2020, the Korea Premium Brand Association (KPBA), with Kim Ho-Seong as the president, opened an application in July 2020, to elect the finalists for the Miss Grand Korea 2020 pageant; of all applicants, 127 were qualified for the interview section, where the number was narrowed down to 36. The scoring system in its final competition consisted of 30% from a public vote, 20% from a pageant camp held by the organizer, and the rest from the final judges' panel.

In addition to the contest held by KBPA, another contest with the same title, Miss Grand Korea 2020, was also held in late 2020, by a former Miss Grand International franchise holder for South Korea, 1L2H Company. However, due to a legal dispute over the trademark, 1L2H Company later renamed its affiliated pageant to Miss Glorize Korea.

== Result ==
=== Main placements ===
| Position | Candidate |
|---|---|
| Miss Grand South Korea 2020 | 03. Lee Hyun Young |
| 1st runner-up | 06. Choi You Na |
| 2nd runners-up | 01. Lee Ga Bin; 04. Shin Ye Eun |
| Top 7 | 12. Lee Da Yeon; 15. Moon Hye Reen; 20. Son Ji Eun |

=== Special awards ===
| Tiltle | Candidate |
|---|---|
| Miss Talent | 05. Lee Ryu Kyung |
| Miss Model | 23. Yu Ji Yoon |
| Miss Photogenic | 18. Shin You Bin |
| Miss Popularity | 24. Kim Yoon Jin |
| Miss Congeniality | 09. Kim Seo Hyun |
| Miss Popular Vote | 12. Lee Da Yeon |
| Miss Best Smile | 29. Koo Young Seul |

== Candidates ==
Thirty-six delegates competed for the title of Miss Grand Korea 2020.

Miss Grand Korea 2020 National finalists
| No. | Candidate | | Height | Province |
| No. | Romanized name | Korean name | Height | Province |
|---|---|---|---|---|
| 01 | Lee Ga Bin | 이가빈 | 1.75 m (5 ft 9 in) | North Gyeongsang |
| 02 | Choi Ko Ya | 최고야 | 1.74 m (5 ft 8 1/2 in) | Ulsan |
| 03 | Lee Hyun Young | 이현영 | 1.72 m (5 ft 7 1/2 in) | Seoul |
| 04 | Shin Ye Eun | 신예은 | 1.73 m (5 ft 8 in) | South Chungcheong |
| 05 | Lee Ryu Kyung | 이류경 | 1.73 m (5 ft 8 in) | Gwangju |
| 06 | Choi You Na | 최유나 | 1.73 m (5 ft 8 in) | Daegu |
| 07 | Lee Da Jeong | 이다정 | 1.72 m (5 ft 7 1/2 in) | Gwangju |
| 08 | Lee Yang Ji | 이양지 | 1.72 m (5 ft 7 1/2 in) | North Gyeongsang |
| 09 | Kim Seo Hyun | 김서현 | 1.72 m (5 ft 7 1/2 in) | South Gyeongsang |
| 10 | Koo Hyun Jin | 구현진 | 1.71 m (5 ft 7 1/2 in) | Jeju |
| 11 | Kim Han Bit | 김한빛 | 1.70 m (5 ft 7 in) | Incheon |
| 12 | Lee Da Yeon | 이다연 | 1.69 m (5 ft 6 1/2 in) | Gyeonggi |
| 13 | Gong Ra Yoon | 공라윤 | 1.69 m (5 ft 6 1/2 in) | Ulsan |
| 14 | Shin Jeong Won | 신정원 | 1.69 m (5 ft 6 1/2 in) | Busan |
| 15 | Moon Hye Reen | 문혜린 | 1.68 m (5 ft 6 in) | Busan |
| 16 | Choi Hye Eun | 최혜은 | 1.68 m (5 ft 6 in) | North Chungcheong |
| 17 | Lee Kyu Yeon | 이규연 | 1.68 m (5 ft 6 in) | Sejong |
| 18 | Shin You Bin | 신유빈 | 1.67 m (5 ft 5 1/2 in) | North Jeolla |
| 19 | Han Hyun Hee | 한현희 | 1.67 m (5 ft 5 1/2 in) | Daejeon |
| 20 | Son Ji Eun | 손지은 | 1.67 m (5 ft 5 1/2 in) | South Jeolla |
| 21 | Yoon Hye Jin | 윤혜진 | 1.67 m (5 ft 5 1/2 in) | Daegu |
| 22 | Kim Ria | 김리아 | 1.65 m (5 ft 5 in) | South Gyeongsang |
| 23 | Yu Ji Yoon | 유지윤 | 1.67 m (5 ft 5 1/2 in) | North Jeolla |
| 24 | Kim Yoon Jin | 김윤진 | 1.64 m (5 ft 4 1/2 in) | South Jeolla |
| 25 | Shin Yi Won | 신이원 | 1.64 m (5 ft 4 1/2 in) | Seoul |
| 26 | Han Na Hee | 한나희 | 1.63 m (5 ft 4 in) | Incheon |
| 27 | Bang So Yun | 방소윤 | 1.63 m (5 ft 4 in) | Gyeonggi |
| 28 | Park Sang Hee | 박상희 | 1.63 m (5 ft 4 in) | Gangwon |
| 29 | Koo Young Seul | 구영슬 | 1.63 m (5 ft 4 in) | Ulsan |
| 30 | Jung So Young | 정소영 | 1.63 m (5 ft 4 in) | South Chungcheong |
| 31 | Choi Seung Hee | 최승희 | 1.62 m (5 ft 4 in) | Jeju |
| 32 | Park Saet Byeol | 박샛별 | 1.61 m (5 ft 3 1/2 in) | Daejeon |
| 33 | Seo Sol Bin | 서솔빈 | 1.61 m (5 ft 3 1/2 in) | Gangwon |
| 34 | Jeon Chae Hyun | 전채현 | 1.61 m (5 ft 3 1/2 in) | Seoul |
| 35 | Yu Jae Sook | 유재숙 | 1.60 m (5 ft 3 in) | North Chungcheong |
| 36 | Lee Na Ra | 이나라 | 1.60 m (5 ft 3 in) | Sejong |
