= Heliu, Anhui =

Heliu 河溜镇
- Town
- Interactive map of Heliu
- Coordinates: 33°02′02″N 116°58′48″E
- Country: People's Republic of China
- Province: Anhui
- Prefecture-level city: Bengbu
- County: Huaiyuan
- Elevation: 22 m (72 ft)
- Time zone: UTC+8 (China Standard)
- Area code: 0552

Heliu (Chinese: 河溜; pinyin: Héliū) is a town of Huaiyuan County in northern Anhui province, China, located on the southern (right) bank of the Guo River (涡河) 22 kilometres (14 mi) north-northwest of the county seat. As of 2011, it has 20 villages under its administration.

== See also ==
- List of township-level divisions of Anhui
