= Longshan Temple =

Longshan Temple (Chinese: 龍山寺; pinyin: Lóngshān Sì; POJ: Liông-san-sī) may refer to:

- Longshan Temple (Zhuzhou), Zhuzhou, Hunan, China.
- Longshan Temple (Jinjiang), Jinjiang, Fujian, China
- Longshan Temple (Lukang), Changhua, Taiwan
- Lungshan Temple (Taipei), located in Wanhua District (alternately known as Bangka/Mengjia), Taipei, Taiwan
- Fengshan Longshan Temple, Kaohsiung, Taiwan
