= Guo River =

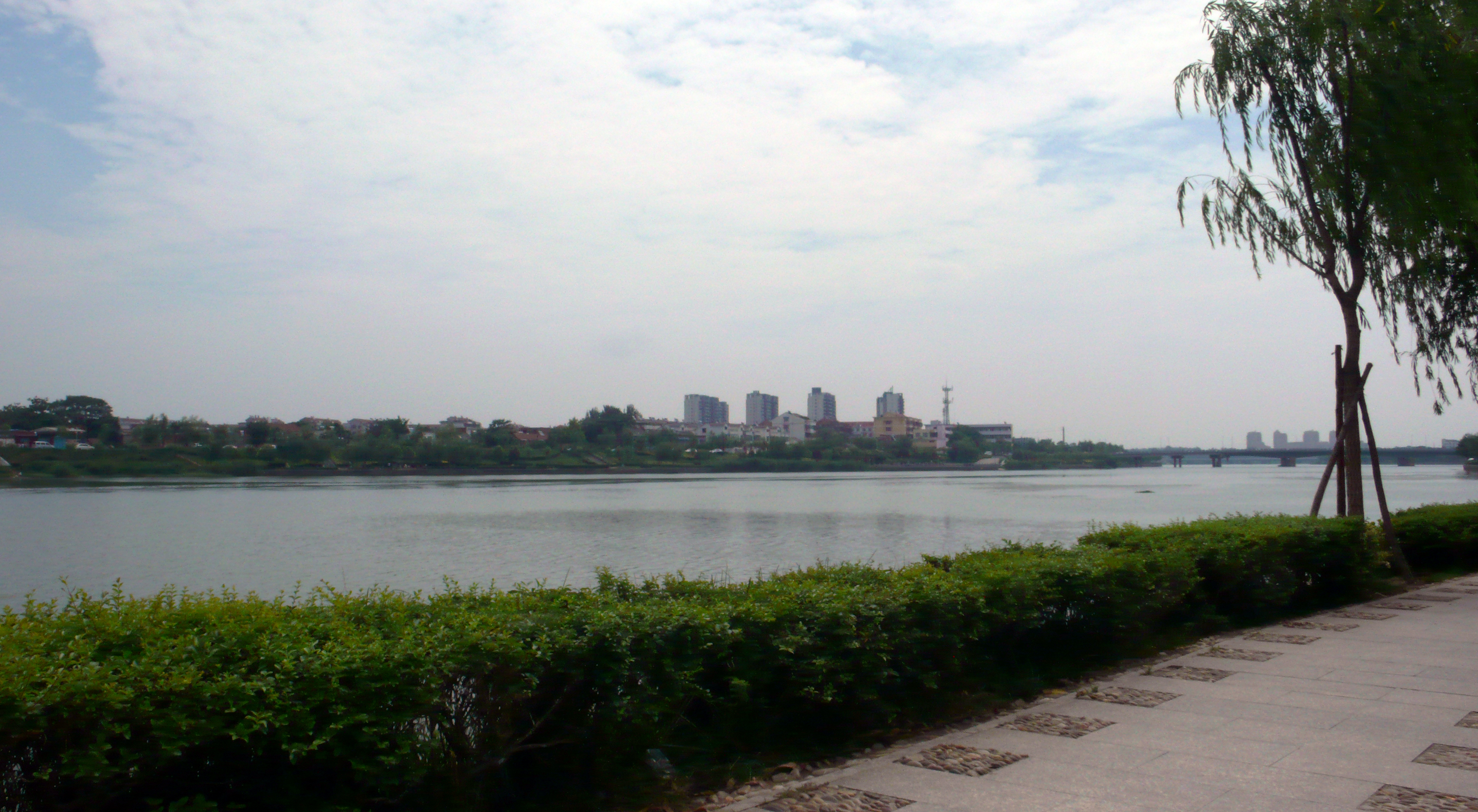
- Guo River at Bozhou

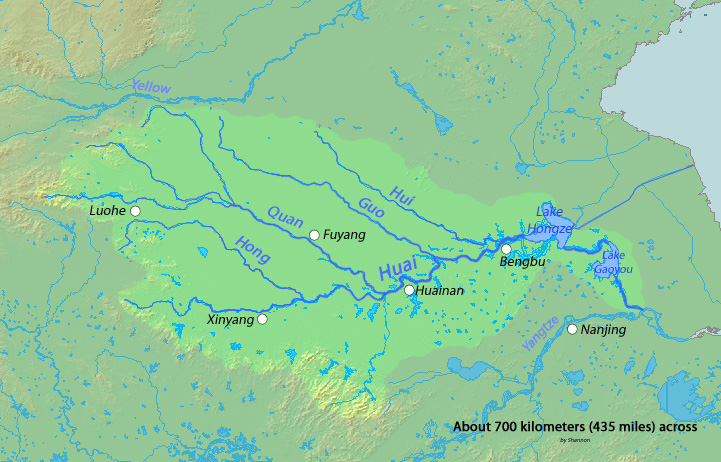
- Map showing the Guo River and Huai River
- Native name: 涡河/渦河 (Chinese)

Location
- Country: China
- State: Henan, Anhui
- Region: Northern China and Eastern China
- Cities: Kaifeng, Bozhou

Physical characteristics
- Source
  - location: Near Kaifeng, Henan province, China
- Mouth: Huai River
  - location: Huaiyuan County, Anhui Province, China
- Length: 261.5 mi (420.8 km), Northwest-Southeast
- Basin size: 6,141 sq mi (15,910 km^{2})

Basin features
- River system: Huai River watershed
- Tributaries
  - left: Huiji River, Tiedi River, Dasha River, Zhaowang River, Wujia River
  - right: You River

The Guo River (simplified Chinese: 涡河; traditional Chinese: 渦河; pinyin: Guō Hé) is a major tributary river on the left bank of Huai River. The source of Guo River is near Kaifeng, Henan province, which is very close to Yellow River. This river is generally an abandoned course of Yellow River. It does not have a remarkable water source and is recharged mainly by groundwater, rainwater and other rivers. Due to the influence of the changing path of Yellow River, the path of Guo River changed frequently throughout the history. The last time Guo River changed its path was during the 1938 Huayuankou flood of the Yellow River. Guo River reaches the Huai River in Anhui province. Guo River is almost entirely located on the plain. The total head of the entire Guo River is only about 59 meters which indicates a very low gradient. The lower section of Guo River is navigable.
