= Miss Grand Korea 2021 =

5th Miss Grand South Korea, beauty pageant edition

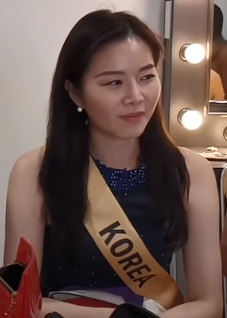
- Lee Jiho, Miss Grand Korea 2021
- Date: 1 October 2021
- Venue: Daejeon Convention Center, Yuseong, Daejeon
- Broadcaster: Facebook
- Entrants: 22
- Placements: 7
- Winner: Lee Ji-ho (Seoul)
- Congeniality: Lee Ga-On (Seoul)
- Photogenic: Choi Su-Bi (Seoul)

External videos
- Miss Grand Korea 2021 Grand Final Competition, on November 26, 2021, YouTube video

Miss Grand Korea 2021 was the fifth edition of the Miss Grand Korea beauty pageant, held on October 1, 2021, at the Daejeon Convention Center, Yuseong, Daejeon, where a twenty-five-year-old Dankook University graduate student from Seoul, Lee Ji-ho, was announced the winner. Ji-ho later represented the country at the Miss Grand International 2021 held in Thailand on December 2, but she was unplaced.

The contest featured twenty-two candidates, who qualified for the national pageant via an audition held earlier on September 9. Due to the spread of COVID-19 and to comply with government quarantine guidelines, the number of attendances was limited to fifty people, including staff, participants, and broadcast teams.

== Background ==
An application for the Miss Grand South Korea 2021 was officially opened on April 19, 2021, with a deadline on May 16, and the grand final was initially scheduled for June 11 at the Grand Walkerhill Hotel, Seoul. However, due to the daily increase in COVID-19-related confirmed cases in the country and the government social distancing guidelines, the event was rescheduled to October 1, with the pageant camp scheduled from September 29, at a different venue, Daejeon Convention Center, Yuseong, Daejeon.

After the deadline, an initial profile screening was performed to select the qualified applicants to face an actual audition held on September 9, when the twenty-two finalists for the pageant were declared.

== Result ==
=== Main placements ===
Position	Candidate
Miss Grand South Korea 2021	01. Lee Jiho
Runners-up	03. Lim Seon-Yeong; 14. Lim Ga-Yeong; 22. Lee Hyeon-Ah
Top 7	04. Ahn Ji-Yeong; 12. Yun Ji-Won; 19. Park Yeon-seo

=== Special awards ===
Tiltle	Candidate
Miss Talent	10. Kim Bo-Song
Miss Model	18. Lee Su-Young
Miss Photogenic	16. Choi Su-Bi
Miss Popularity	06. Choi Ji-Hyo
Miss Congeniality	05. Lee Ga-On
Miss Popular Vote	22. Lee Hyun-Ah
Miss Best Smile	09. Kim Soo-Hyun
Miss Exorgen Influencer	12. Yoon Ji Won

== Candidates ==
Twenty-two delegates competed for the title of Miss Grand South Korea 2021.

No.	Candidate		Height
No.	Romanized name	Korean name	Height
01	Lee Jiho	이지호	1.75 m (5 ft 9 in)
02	Ji Hyojin	지효진	1.74 m (5 ft 8 1/2 in)
03	Lim Seon-Yeong	임선영	1.72 m (5 ft 7 1/2 in)
04	Ahn Ji-Yeong	안지영	1.72 m (5 ft 7 1/2 in)
05	Lee Ga-On	이가온	1.71 m (5 ft 7 1/2 in)
06	Choi Ji-Hyo	최지효	1.70 m (5 ft 7 in)
07	Ahn Min-jeong	안민정	1.69 m (5 ft 6 1/2 in)
08	Lee Seo-na	이선아	1.69 m (5 ft 6 1/2 in)
09	Kim Soo-Hyun	김수현	1.68 m (5 ft 6 in)
10	Kim Bo-Song	김보송	1.66 m (5 ft 5 1/2 in)
11	Min Chae-rin	민채린	1.66 m (5 ft 5 1/2 in)
12	Yoon Ji Won	윤지원	1.65 m (5 ft 5 in)
13	Lee Ye-jin	이예진	1.65 m (5 ft 5 in)
14	Lim Ga-Yeong	임가영	1.65 m (5 ft 5 in)
15	Kim Tae-rin	김태린	1.65 m (5 ft 5 in)
16	Choi Su-Bi	최수비	1.65 m (5 ft 5 in)
17	Park Ji-seon	박지선	1.63 m (5 ft 4 in)
18	Lee Su-Young	이수영	1.63 m (5 ft 4 in)
19	Park Yeon-seo	박연서	1.62 m (5 ft 4 in)
20	Jeong Hye-won	정혜원	1.62 m (5 ft 4 in)
21	Park Su-jin	박수진	1.62 m (5 ft 4 in)
22	Lee Hyun-Ah	이현아	1.61 m (5 ft 3 1/2 in)
