= Miss Grand Korea 2018 =

2nd Miss Grand Korea competition

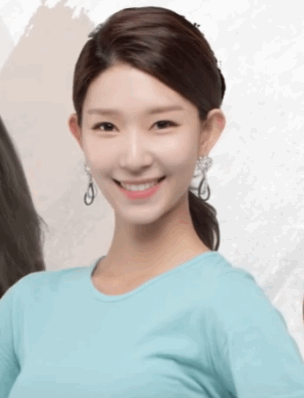
- Choi Min, the winner of the contest
- Date: August 30, 2018
- Venue: Dinozze Convention, Seongdong, Seoul
- Entrants: 22
- Placements: 5
- Winner: Choi Min (Seongnam)
- Photogenic: Hong Ah-ri (Ansan)

Miss Grand Korea 2018 was the second edition of the Miss Grand Korea pageant, held on August 30, 2018, at the Dinozze Convention (디노체 컨벤션), Seongdong, Seoul. Twenty-two contestants, who qualified for the national round through the regional preliminaries, competed for the title. Of whom, Choi Min of Seongnam was announced the winner (진), while Park Na-yeon of Goyang was elected the vice-miss (선).

Choi Min later represented South Korea at the Miss Grand International 2018 pageant in Myanmar but was unplaced. In addition to the pageant title, Choi Min was also assumed ambassador of the Korean Demilitarized Zone (DMZ) to promote peace in the Korean peninsula.

== Background ==
On July 2, 2018, the Miss Grand Korea Committee released a document regarding the schedule of the Miss Grand Korea 2018 competition, which was set for August 30, 2018, at the Dinozze Convention, Seongdong, Seoul, with the start date for submitting documents for the regional preliminaries on July 10.

All national finalists for the Miss Grand Korea 2018 competition were determined through the regional preliminary rounds. The regional audition was organized four times in Seoul, Daegu, Gwangju, and Gyeonggi Province from July 10 – August 20; the qualifiers then entered the pageant camp from August 24 – 29 before competing in the grand final on August 30.

The following table provides the data related to the regional preliminaries of the Miss Grand Korea 2018 competition.

Host province/city	Date and venue	Number of qualifiers	Ref.
Seoul	July 20, 2018, at the Youngsan Art Hall, Yeongdeungpo	7	
Daegu	July 28, 2018, at the Kensington Prince Hotel, Nam	4	
Gyeonggi	August 10, 2018, at the Gunpo Culture and Arts Center	6	
Gwangju	August 15, 2018	6	

== Result ==
Placement	Candidate
Miss Grand Korea 2018 (진)	21. Seongnam – Choi Min
Runner-up (선)	10. Goyang – Park Na-yeon
Top 5 (미)	05. Busan – Kim Ga-eun; 06. Seoul – Kim Saeb-yeol; 19. Daegu – Jeong Yu-hyeon
Special awards
Best Talent	12. Anyang – Shin Hye-rim; 04. Gwangju – Kwon Min-ju
Best in Swimsuit	02. Bucheon – Kang Ha-seul-lin
Miss Photogenic	22. Ansan – Hong Ah-ri
Miss Beauty Face	03. North Gyeongsang – Go Eun-byeol
Miss Daily Korea	16. Yongin –Lim Minji
Miss Labiotte	10. Goyang – Park Na-yeon
Miss Pure Model Agency	18. Incheon – Jeon Seul-ah
Miss Grid Construction	08. Gyeonggi – Kim Hyeon-ah

== Candidates ==
Initially, 23 contestants were qualified via the regional preliminary rounds, but one withdrew, bringing the total to 22.

No.	Province/City	Candidate		Height
No.	Province/City	Romanized name	Korean name	Height
01.	South Jeolla	Kang Su-bin	강수빈	1.68 m (5 ft 6 in)
02.	Bucheon	Kang Ha-seul-lin	강하슬린	1.71 m (5 ft 7 1/2 in)
03.	North Gyeongsang	Go Eun-byeol	고은별	1.68 m (5 ft 6 in)
04.	Gwangju	Kwon Min-ju	권민주	1.70 m (5 ft 7 in)
05.	Busan	Kim Ga-eun	김가은	1.73 m (5 ft 8 in)
06.	Seoul	Kim Saeb-yeol	김샛별	1.73 m (5 ft 8 in)
07.	Sejong	Kim Su-min	김수민	1.63 m (5 ft 4 in)
08.	Gyeonggi	Kim Hyeon-ah	김현아	1.73 m (5 ft 8 in)
09.	South Gyeongsang	Kim Hyeon-jin	김현진	1.70 m (5 ft 7 in)
10.	Goyang	Park Na-yeon	박나연	1.66 m (5 ft 5 1/2 in)
11.	North Chungcheong	Park Seo-ha	박서하	1.67 m (5 ft 5 1/2 in)
12.	Anyang	Shin Hye-rim	신혜림	1.70 m (5 ft 7 in)
13.	North Jeolla	Ahn Su-hee	안수희	1.68 m (5 ft 6 in)
14.	Suwon	Yun Jeong	윤정	1.65 m (5 ft 5 in)
15.	Gangwon	Lee Mee-hee	이미희	1.63 m (5 ft 4 in)
16.	Yongin	Lim Min-ji	임민지	1.66 m (5 ft 5 1/2 in)
17.	South Chungcheong	Jang Seo-yeon	장서연	1.61 m (5 ft 3 1/2 in)
18.	Incheon	Jeon Seul-ah	전슬아	1.70 m (5 ft 7 in)
19.	Daegu	Jeong Yu-hyeon	정유현	1.71 m (5 ft 7 1/2 in)
20.	Jeju	Jo Hyeon-mi	조현미	1.68 m (5 ft 6 in)
21.	Seongnam	Choi Min	최민	1.77 m (5 ft 9 1/2 in)
22.	Ansan	Hong Ah-li	홍아리	1.66 m (5 ft 5 1/2 in)
23.	Ulsan	Han Ji-hye (Note: Withdrew)	한지혜	1.70 m (5 ft 7 in)
