= Miss Grand Korea 2023 =

6th edition of the Miss Grand Korea beauty pageant

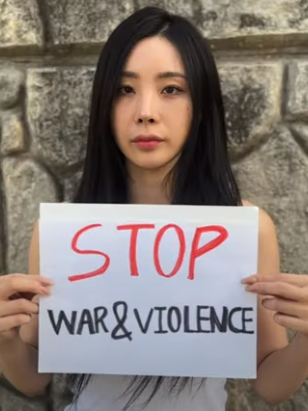
- Park Ji-young, the winner of the contest
- Date: June 4, 2023
- Presenters: Kim Tae-hwan; Im Seon-Yeong
- Venue: Grand Walkerhill Seoul Hotel, Seoul
- Entrants: 18
- Placements: 5
- Winner: Park Ji-young (Seoul)
- Congeniality: Lee Hyo-joo (Daegu)
- Photogenic: Shin Ye-ji (Sejong)

Miss Grand Korea 2023 competition result by province/city
Colors key
| Winner | Special award winner |
| 1st runner-up | Unplaced |
| 2nd runner-up | Withdrew |
3rd runner-up

External videos
- Grand Final Competition

Miss Grand Korea 2023 was the 6th edition of the Miss Grand Korea pageant, held at the Grand Walkerhill Seoul Hotel, Gwangjin, Seoul, on June 4, 2023. Eighteen candidates from different provinces and cities of South Korea competed for the title. The event featured a live performance by a Korean pop soprano singer, Lee So-ae (이소애), and was hosted by former Jeju MBC announcer, Kim Tae-hwan (김태환), and former 2021 Miss Teen Korea, Im Seon-Yeong (임선영).

At the end of the event, a 26-year-old freelance television presenter from Seoul, Park Ji-young, was named the winner and was crowned by the outgoing Miss Grand Korea 2022 Lee Juyeon. Her court included Han Da-yeon as the first vice-miss (진), Cho Hye-min as the second vice-miss (선), and Lee Myung-hee and Lee Na-ra as the third vice-misses (미).

Park Ji-young later represented South Korea at the international parent stage, Miss Grand International 2023, held in Vietnam on October 25, but was unplaced.

== Result ==
| Position | Delegate |
|---|---|
| Miss Grand Korea 2023 | 04. Seoul – Park Ji-young |
| 1st runner-up | 03. Gyeonggi – Han Da-yeon |
| 2nd runner-up | 17. Ulsan – Cho Hye-min |
| 3rd runners-up | 02. Daejeon – Lee Myung-hee; 12. North Jeolla – Lee Na-ra |
Special awards
| Miss Talent | 11. South Gyeongsang – Choi Yun-hee |
| Miss Model | 08. North Chungcheong – Park Ji-yeon |
| Miss Photogenic | 16. Sejong – Shin Ye-ji |
| Miss Popularity | 15. Gwangju – Choi Hae-won |
| Miss Congeniality | 06. Daegu – Lee Hyo-joo |
| Miss Exorigen Influencer | 04. Seoul – Park Ji-young |
| Miss Public Choice | 11. South Gyeongsang – Choi Yun-hee |

== Contestants ==
Originally, twenty candidates were confirmed to participate, but two withdrew, making the finalized total of eighteen contestants.

| No. | Province/City | Candidate | | Height |
| No. | Province/City | Romanized name | Korean name | Height |
|---|---|---|---|---|
| 01. | Yongin | Jeong Hye-bin (Note: Withdrew) | 정혜빈 | 1.76 m (5 ft 9 1/2 in) |
| 02. | Daejeon | Lee Myung-hee | 이명희 | 1.75 m (5 ft 9 in) |
| 03. | Gyeonggi | Han Da-yeon | 한다연 | 1.71 m (5 ft 7 1/2 in) |
| 04. | Seoul | Park Ji-young | 박지영 | 1.70 m (5 ft 7 in) |
| 05. | Busan | Jeong Myeong-moon | 정명문 | 1.69 m (5 ft 6 1/2 in) |
| 06. | Daegu | Lee Hyo-joo | 이효주 | 1.68 m (5 ft 6 in) |
| 07. | Jeju | Hyein Kim | 김혜인 | 1.68 m (5 ft 6 in) |
| 08. | North Chungcheong | Park Ji-yeon | 박지연 | 1.66 m (5 ft 5 1/2 in) |
| 09. | South Chungcheong | Yang Ji-eun | 양지은 | 1.66 m (5 ft 5 1/2 in) |
| 10. | North Gyeongsang | Hwang Ha-jae | 황하제 | 1.65 m (5 ft 5 in) |
| 11. | South Gyeongsang | Choi Yun-hee | 최윤희 | 1.64 m (5 ft 4 1/2 in) |
| 12. | North Jeolla | Lee Na-ra | 이나라 | 1.64 m (5 ft 4 1/2 in) |
| 13. | South Jeolla | Kim Seong-yeong | 김성령 | 1.63 m (5 ft 4 in) |
| 14. | Incheon | Jo Ye-eun | 조예은 | 1.63 m (5 ft 4 in) |
| 15. | Gwangju | Choi Hae-won | 최해원 | 1.63 m (5 ft 4 in) |
| 16. | Sejong | Shin Ye-ji | 신예지 | 1.62 m (5 ft 4 in) |
| 17. | Ulsan | Cho Hye-min | 조혜민 | 1.61 m (5 ft 3 1/2 in) |
| 18. | Suwon | Jin Ho-jeong | 진호정 | 1.61 m (5 ft 3 1/2 in) |
| 19. | Goyang | Dahye Park | 박다혜 | 1.61 m (5 ft 3 1/2 in) |
| 20. | Gangwon | Hong Ji-yoon | 홍지윤 | 1.59 m (5 ft 2 1/2 in) |
