= Fei River =

Fei River (淝河 or 淝水), the name given to a number of rivers around Anhui, China, may refer to:

- North Fei River, a tributary of the Huai River, reputed to be the site of the Battle of Fei River
- South Fei River, a river that flows through Hefei and into Chao Lake
- East Fei River, a tributary of the Huai River that flows through Wabu Lake
- West Fei River, a tributary of the Huai River that enters the Huai River at Fengtai

== See also ==
- Battle of Fei River, AD 383, Anhui
