= Huaiyuan County =

Coordinates: 33°02′53″N 117°01′09″E

Huaiyuan 怀远县 Hwaiyuan
- County
- Interactive map of Huaiyuan
- Country: China
- Province: Anhui
- Prefecture-level city: Bengbu

Area
  - Total: 2,391.02 km^{2} (923.18 sq mi)

Population (2020)
  - Total: 935,335
  - Density: 391.187/km^{2} (1,013.17/sq mi)
- Time zone: UTC+8 (China Standard)
- Postal code: 233400

Huaiyuan County (Postal: Hweiyuen; simplified Chinese: 怀远县; traditional Chinese: 懷遠縣; pinyin: Huáiyuǎn Xiàn) is a county in the north of Anhui Province, China. It is under the administration of Bengbu city.

== Administrative divisions ==
Huaiyuan County has 15 towns and 3 townships.

15 Towns

- Liucheng (榴城镇)
- Baoji (鲍集镇)
- Longkang (龙亢镇)
- Heliu (河溜镇)
- Changfen (常坟镇)
- Shuangqiaoji (双桥集镇)
- Weizhuang (魏庄镇)
- Wanfu (万福镇)
- Tangji (唐集镇)
- Bailianpo (白莲坡镇)
- Chuji (褚集镇)
- Gucheng (古城镇)
- Jingshan (荆山镇)
- Feinan (淝南镇)
- Chenji (陈集乡)

3 Townships

- Feihe (淝河乡)
- Xuwei (徐圩乡)
- Lanqiao (兰桥乡)

== Climate ==
Climate data for Huaiyuan, elevation 25 m (82 ft), (1991–2020 normals, extremes 1981–present)
| Month | Jan | Feb | Mar | Apr | May | Jun | Jul | Aug | Sep | Oct | Nov | Dec | Year |
|---|---|---|---|---|---|---|---|---|---|---|---|---|---|
| Record high °C (°F) | 20.0 (68.0) | 25.5 (77.9) | 32.6 (90.7) | 34.2 (93.6) | 36.4 (97.5) | 37.9 (100.2) | 40.0 (104.0) | 38.9 (102.0) | 37.9 (100.2) | 33.6 (92.5) | 28.7 (83.7) | 22.5 (72.5) | 40.0 (104.0) |
| Mean daily maximum °C (°F) | 6.5 (43.7) | 9.6 (49.3) | 15.9 (60.6) | 21.8 (71.2) | 27.4 (81.3) | 30.7 (87.3) | 32.1 (89.8) | 31.7 (89.1) | 27.4 (81.3) | 22.7 (72.9) | 15.4 (59.7) | 8.8 (47.8) | 20.8 (69.5) |
| Daily mean °C (°F) | 2.2 (36.0) | 4.9 (40.8) | 10.6 (51.1) | 16.3 (61.3) | 22.1 (71.8) | 25.9 (78.6) | 28.1 (82.6) | 27.6 (81.7) | 22.7 (72.9) | 17.5 (63.5) | 10.6 (51.1) | 4.2 (39.6) | 16.1 (60.9) |
| Mean daily minimum °C (°F) | −1.2 (29.8) | 1.2 (34.2) | 6.1 (43.0) | 11.4 (52.5) | 17.2 (63.0) | 21.6 (70.9) | 24.9 (76.8) | 24.4 (75.9) | 19.2 (66.6) | 13.5 (56.3) | 6.7 (44.1) | 0.6 (33.1) | 12.1 (53.9) |
| Record low °C (°F) | −12.1 (10.2) | −11.4 (11.5) | −4.5 (23.9) | 0.0 (32.0) | 7.5 (45.5) | 12.2 (54.0) | 19.0 (66.2) | 15.4 (59.7) | 10.5 (50.9) | 1.4 (34.5) | −6.7 (19.9) | −12.8 (9.0) | −12.8 (9.0) |
| Average precipitation mm (inches) | 30.7 (1.21) | 35.9 (1.41) | 52.9 (2.08) | 55.4 (2.18) | 73.4 (2.89) | 149.4 (5.88) | 207.6 (8.17) | 149.1 (5.87) | 87.8 (3.46) | 49.8 (1.96) | 39.6 (1.56) | 24.1 (0.95) | 955.7 (37.62) |
| Average precipitation days (≥ 0.1 mm) | 6.5 | 7.9 | 8.2 | 7.5 | 8.5 | 9.3 | 13.0 | 12.1 | 8.3 | 7.2 | 7.4 | 5.8 | 101.7 |
| Average snowy days | 4.1 | 2.7 | 1.2 | 0 | 0 | 0 | 0 | 0 | 0 | 0 | 0.6 | 1.3 | 9.9 |
| Average relative humidity (%) | 70 | 71 | 64 | 66 | 67 | 69 | 79 | 81 | 78 | 72 | 71 | 70 | 72 |
| Mean monthly sunshine hours | 117.1 | 117.8 | 172.9 | 191.4 | 195.8 | 166.1 | 174.5 | 174.2 | 151.9 | 152.4 | 136.2 | 130.7 | 1,881 |
| Percentage possible sunshine | 37 | 38 | 46 | 49 | 46 | 39 | 40 | 43 | 41 | 44 | 44 | 42 | 42 |
Source: China Meteorological Administration
