= Long Sơn (disambiguation) =

Long Sơn is a commune of Ho Chi Minh City, Vietnam. However, Long Sơn may also refer to the following defunct placenames in Vietnam:

- Long Sơn, An Giang: a ward of Tân Châu, An Giang, now part of Tân Châu ward
- Long Sơn, Thái Hòa: a ward of Thái Hòa in Nghệ An Province, now part of Thái Hòa ward
- Long Sơn, Bắc Giang: a commune of Sơn Động District, now part of Dương Hưu commune
- Long Sơn, Đắk Nông: a commune of Đăk Mil District, now part of Đắk Sắk commune
- Long Sơn, Long An: a commune of Cần Đước District, now part of Mỹ Lệ commune
- Long Sơn, Anh Sơn: a commune of Anh Sơn District in Nghệ An Province, now part of Yên Xuân commune
- Long Sơn, Quảng Ngãi: a commune of Minh Long District, now part of Sơn Mai commune
- Long Sơn, Trà Vinh: a commune of Cầu Ngang District, now part of Hiệp Mỹ commune
