= Feihe, Hefei =

Feihe 淝河镇
- Town
- Location in China
- Coordinates: 31°50′37″N 117°18′17″E
- Country: People's Republic of China
- Province: Anhui
- Prefecture-level city: Hefei
- District: Baohe District
- Time zone: UTC+8 (China Standard)

Feihe (Chinese: 淝河; pinyin: Féihé) is a town in Baohe District, Hefei, Anhui. As of 2020, it administers three residential neighborhoods: Ge Dadian (葛大店), Laoguantang (老官塘), and Jiadaying (贾大郢), as well as the following six villages:

- Huangzhen Village (黄镇村)
- Weixiang Village (卫乡村)
- Huangxiang Village (黄巷村)
- Pingtangwang Village (平塘王村)
- Xijing Village (席井村)
- Guanzhen Village (关镇村)
