= Feihe Township =

Feihe Township 淝河乡
- Township
- Location in China
- Coordinates: 33°7′12″N 117°3′55″E
- Country: People's Republic of China
- Province: Anhui
- Prefecture-level city: Bengbu
- County: Huaiyuan County
- Time zone: UTC+8 (China Standard)

Feihe Township (simplified Chinese: 淝河乡; traditional Chinese: 武術鄉; pinyin: Féihé Xiāng) is a township in Huaiyuan County, Anhui, China. As of 2020, it administers the following 21 villages:

- Xinji Village (新集村)
- Malu Village (马路村)
- Zhonghuang Village (中黄村)
- Zhongfei Village (中淝村)
- Hongxing Village (红星村)
- Qianhe Village (钱河村)
- Sanguan Village (三关村)
- Shaolou Village (邵楼村)
- Renhe Village (仁和村)
- Miaodong Village (庙东村)
- Taiping Village (太平村)
- Chenzhuang Village (陈庄村)
- Nanhai Village (南海村)
- Lingji Village (岭集村)
- Hezui Village (河嘴村)
- Liuqiao Village (刘桥村)
- Kantuan Village (看疃村)
- Sihu Village (泗湖村)
- Jiwei Village (季圩村)
- Tenghu Village (滕湖村)
- Huwei Village (胡圩村)
