= Longshan Temple (Zhuzhou) =

Buddhist temple in China

- 龙山寺
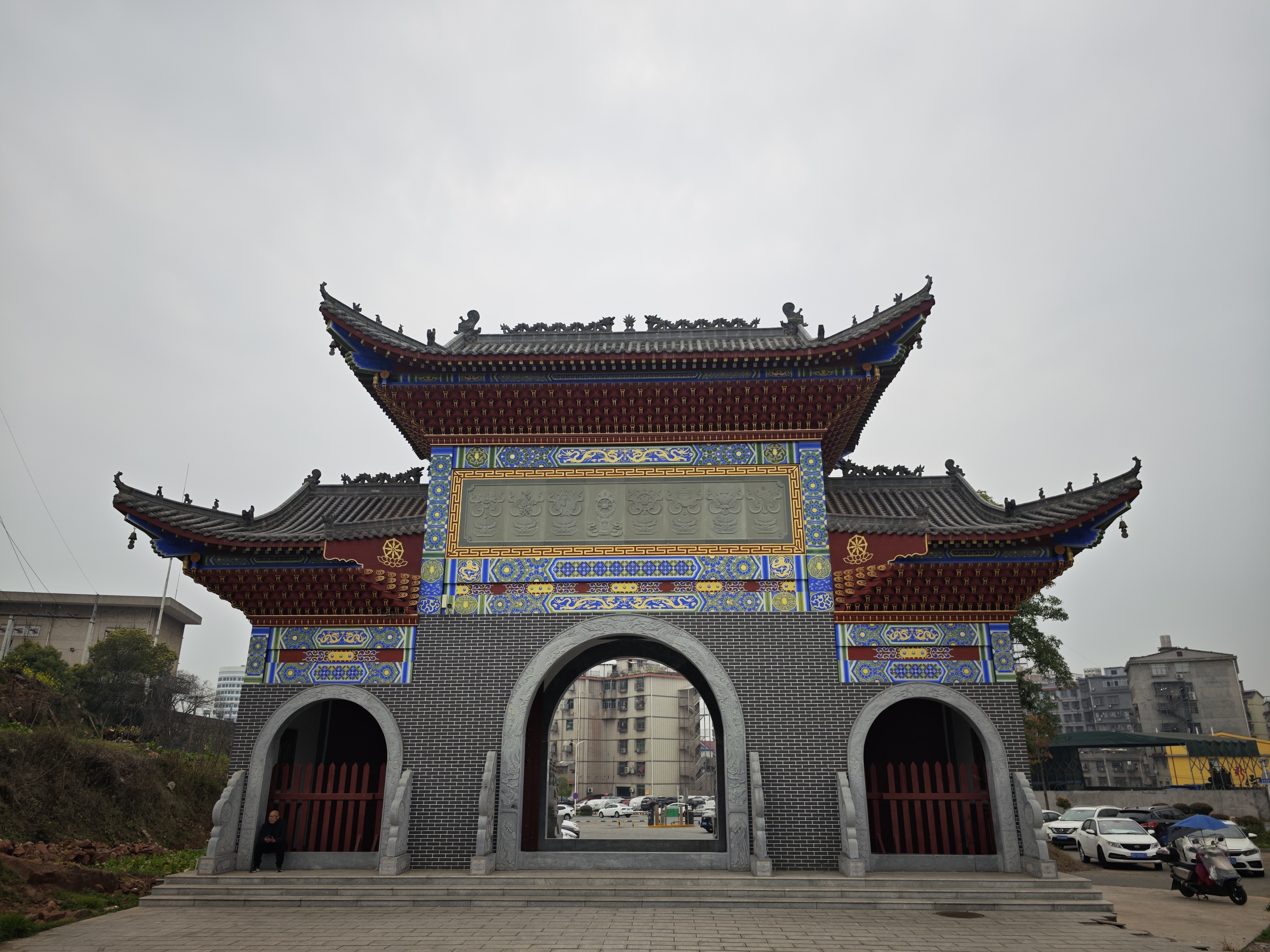
- Shanmen

- Location within Hunan

Religion
- Affiliation: Buddhism
- Sect: Chan Buddhism

Location
- Location: Hetang District, Zhuzhou, Hunan, China
- Interactive map of Longshan Temple
- Coordinates: 27°50′32″N 113°11′13″E

Architecture
- Style: Chinese architecture

Longshan Temple (simplified Chinese: 龙山寺; traditional Chinese: 龍山寺; pinyin: Longshan Sì) is a Buddhist temple located in Hetang District, Zhuzhou, Hunan, China.

== History ==
Longshan Temple was originally built in the reign of Emperor Wu of Liang (464–549).

Due to war and natural disasters Longshan Temple has been rebuilt numerous times since then, respectively in the Wanli period (1573–1620) of the Ming dynasty (1368–1644) and the seventh year (1881) of Guangxu period of the Qing dynasty (1644–1911).

The present version of Longshan Temple was completed in 2003.

== Architecture ==
The existing main buildings include the Shanmen, Four Heavenly Kings Hall, Mahavira Hall, Hall of Guanyin, Bell tower, Drum tower, Dharma Hall, Dining Room, etc.

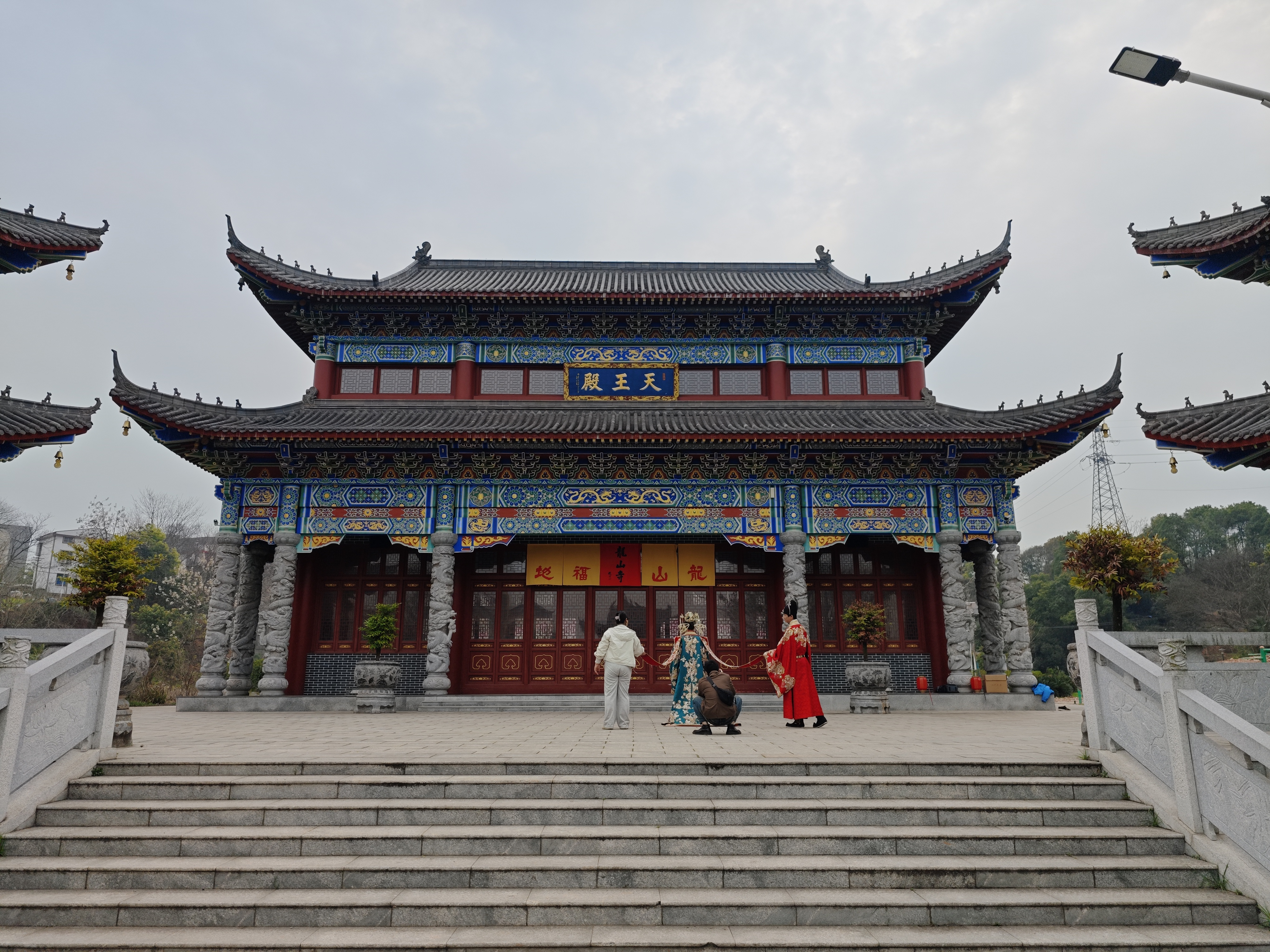
Four Heavenly Kings Hall

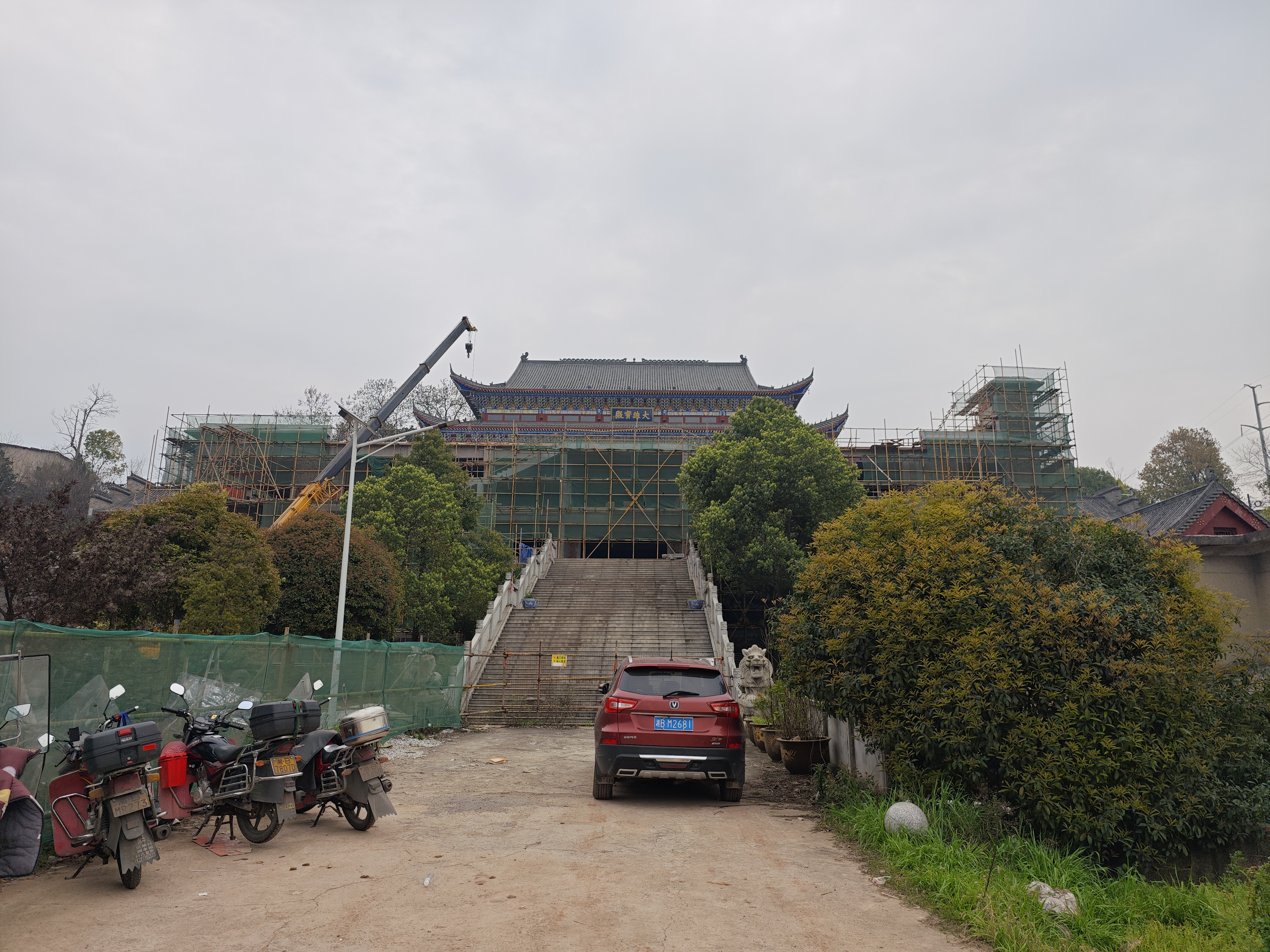
Mahavira Hall

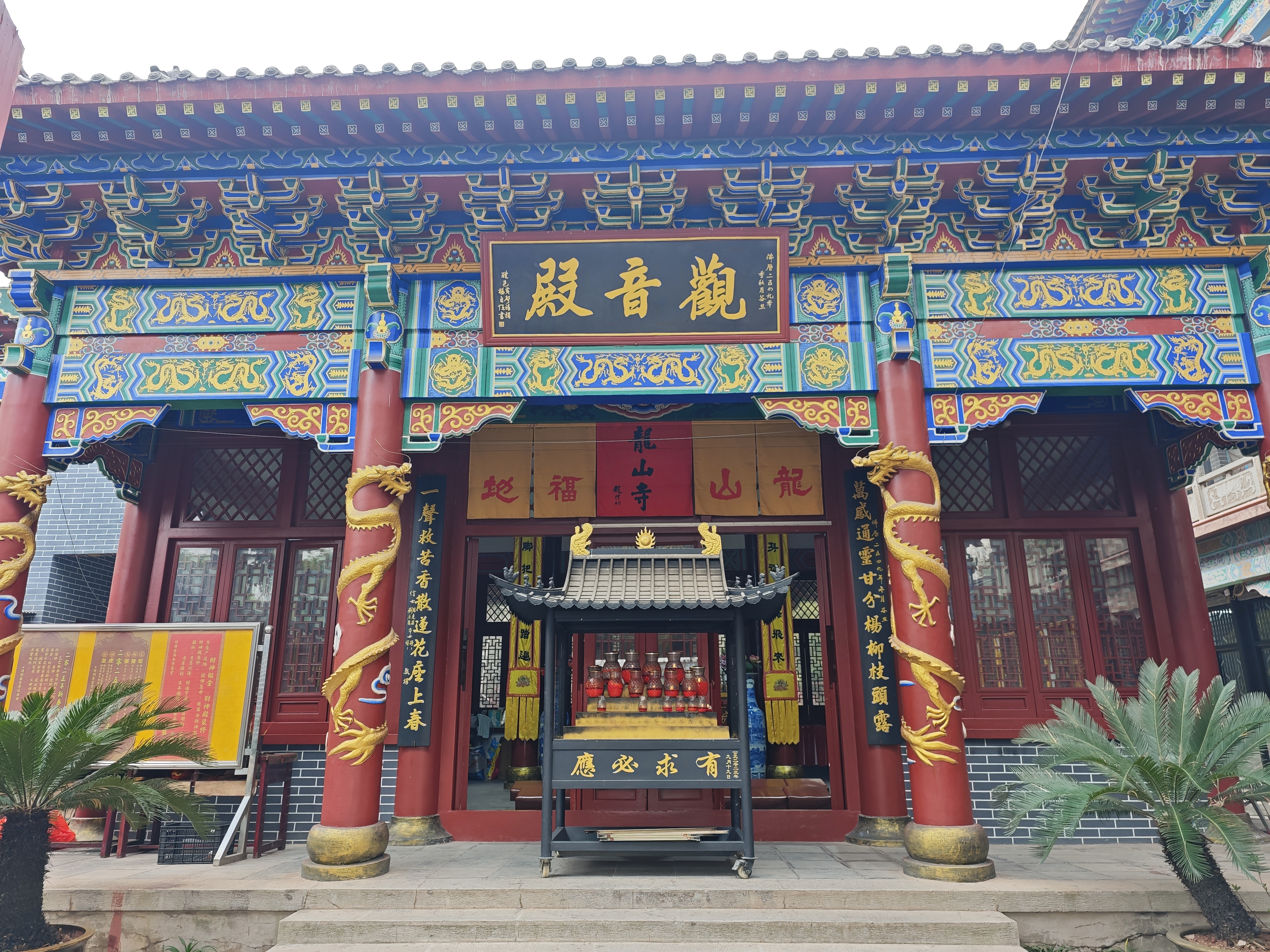
Guanyin Hall

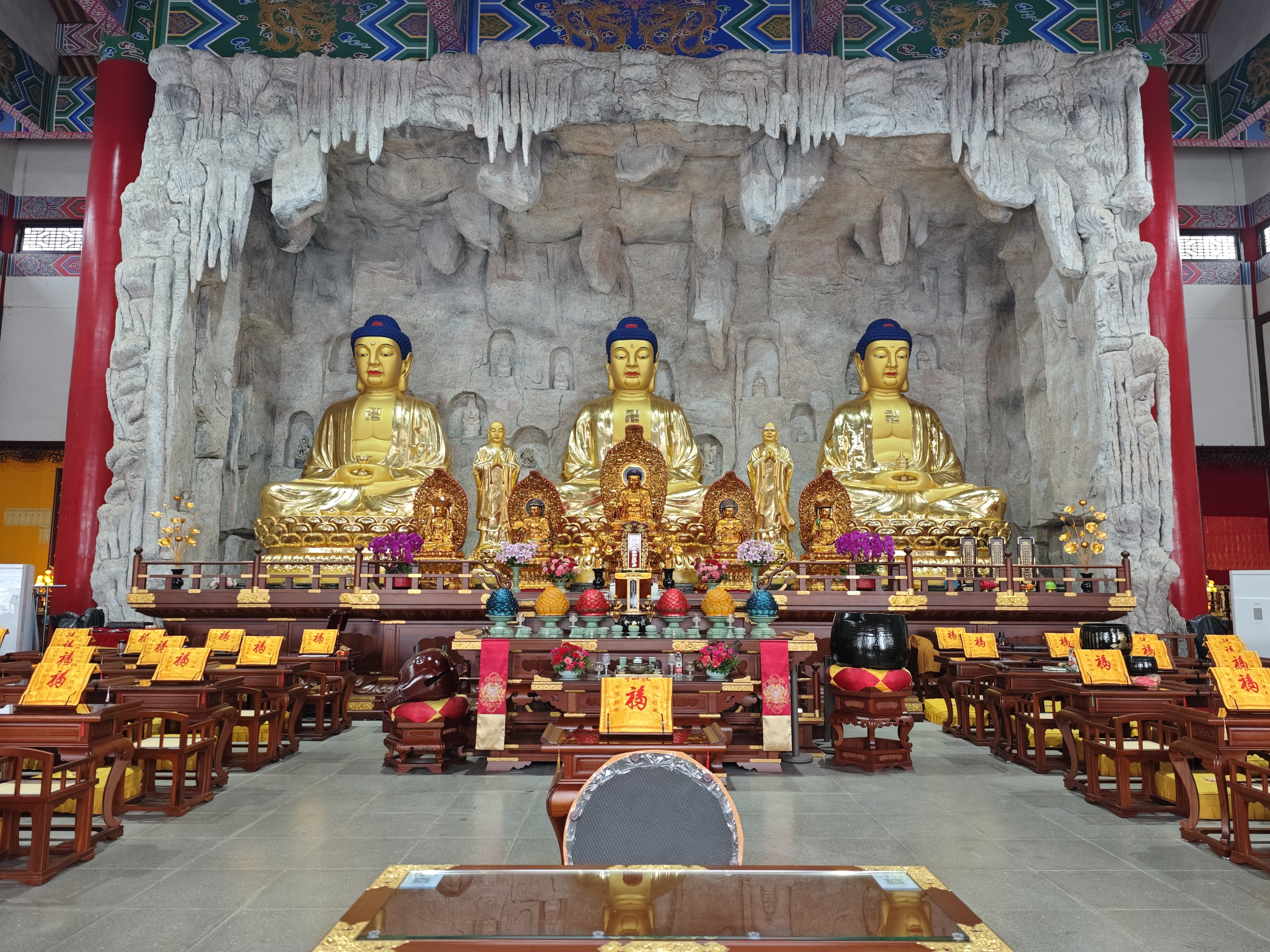
Statues, Mahavira Hall

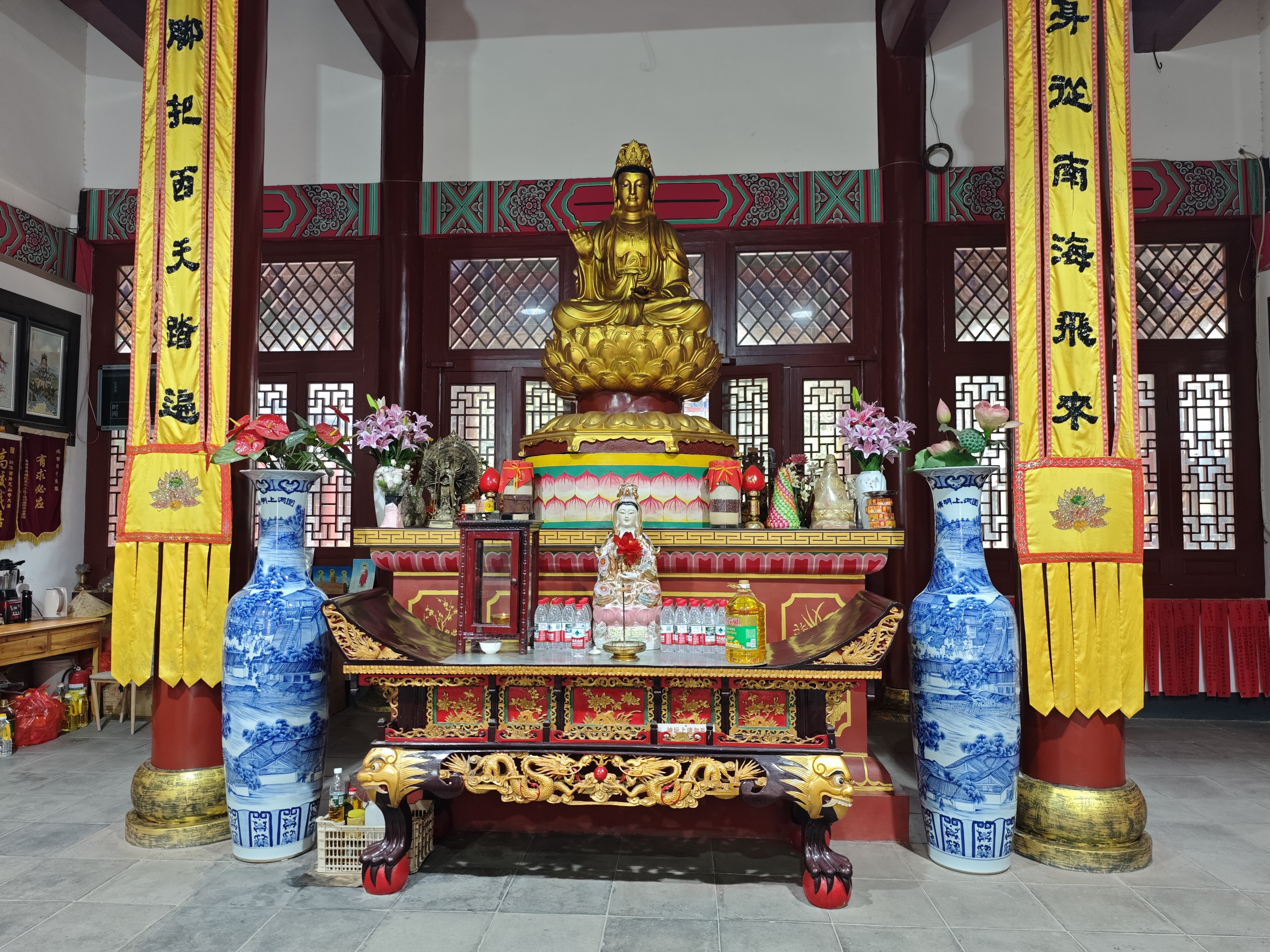
Statues, Guanyin Hall

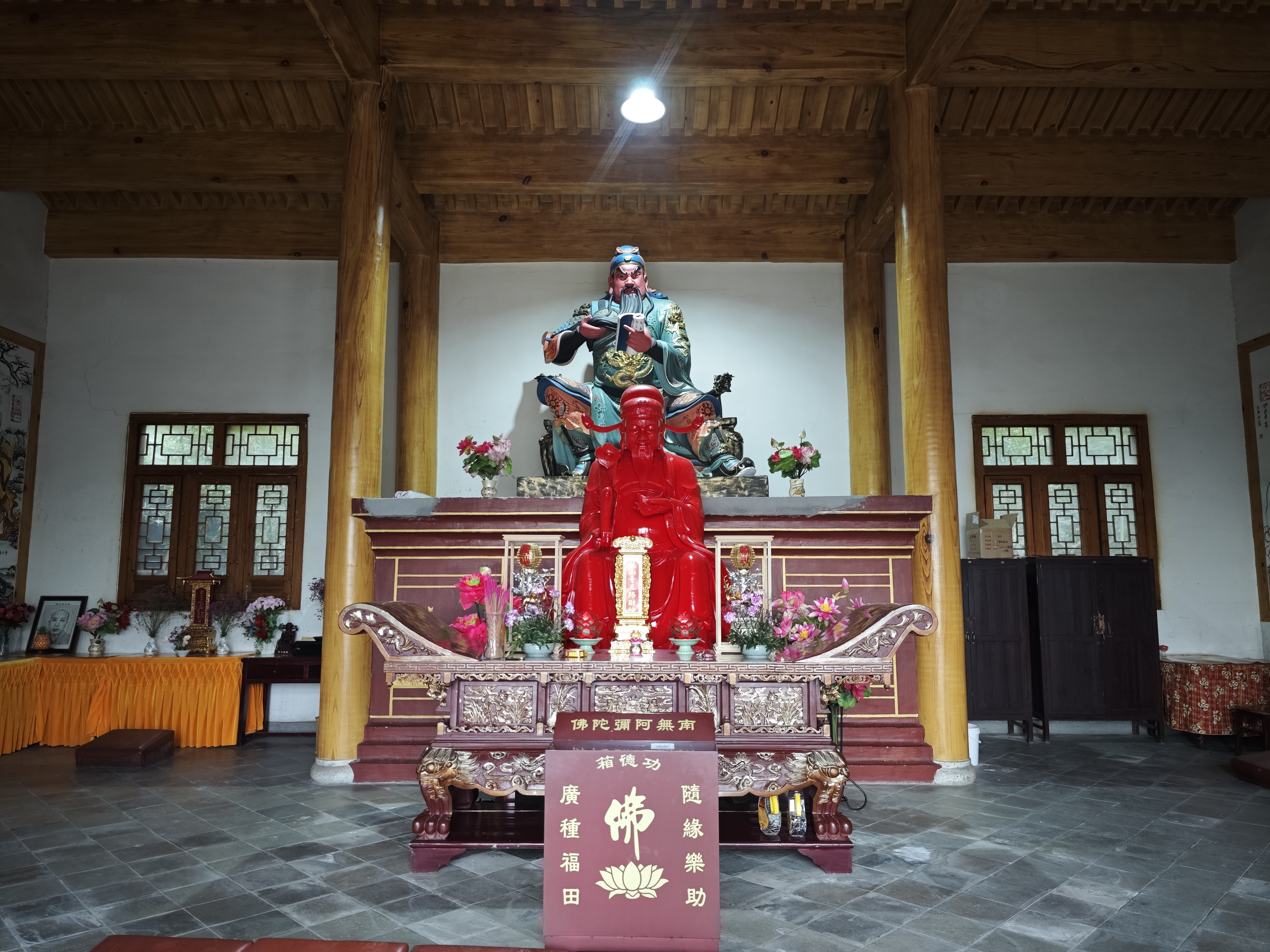
Statue of Guan Yu
