= Longkang =

Coordinates: 25°12′N 117°14′E

Longkang 龙亢镇
- Town

Chinese transcription(s)
- Interactive map of Longkang
- Country: China
- Province: Anhui
- Prefecture: Bengbu
- County: Huaiyuan County
- Time zone: UTC+8 (China Standard Time)

Longkang (simplified Chinese: 龙亢; traditional Chinese: 龍亢; pinyin: Lóngkàng) is a town of Huaiyuan County, Bengbu, Anhui, China.

== See also ==
- List of township-level divisions of Anhui
