= Wabu High School =

Wabu High School 와부고등학교 瓦阜高等學校
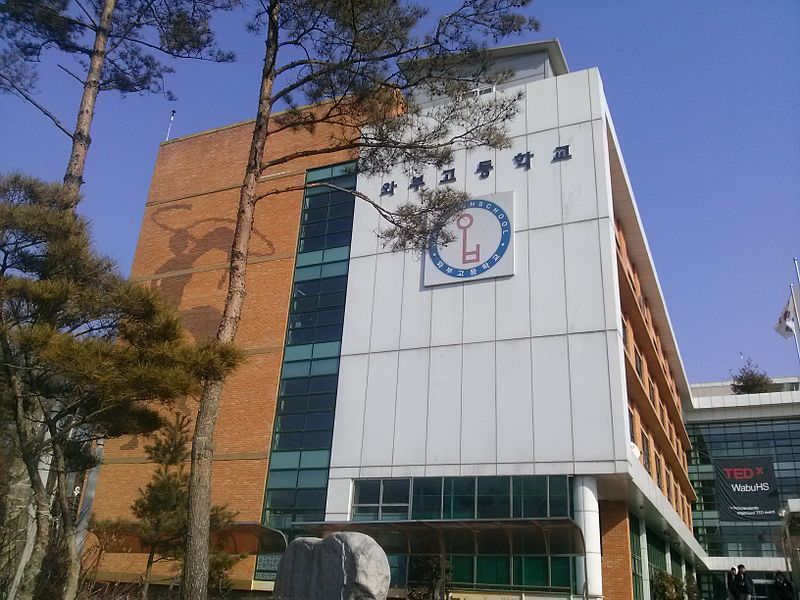
- Namyangju; South Korea

Information
- Type: Public school, Day school
- Motto: An Upright Mind, a Proper Conduct 바른 마음, 바른 행동 正心正行
- Established: 2008
- Principal: Gwang-woo Shin (신광우)
- Faculty: approx. 58
- Grades: 10-12
- Enrollment: approx. 803
- Average class size: 30 students
- Student to teacher ratio: 14:1
- Campus: 127-70 Sure-ro, Wabu-eup, Namyangju, Gyeonggi-do, South Korea
- Annual tuition: approx. $ 1340 (not including lunch fees, etc.)
- Tree: Pine tree
- Flower: Rose
- Song: 와부고등학교 교가
- Website: www.wabu.hs.kr

Wabu High School (also known as Wabu, or Wabu HS; Hangeul: 와부고등학교, 와부고; Hanja: 瓦阜高等學校) is a public college preparatory school located in Namyangju, Gyeonggi, South Korea. It was the first public autonomy high school (Hangeul: 자율형 공립 고등학교) in South Korea.

== Motto ==
- An upright mind (Korean: 바른 마음(정심), Hanja: 正心)
- A proper conduct (Korean: 바른 행동(정행), Hanja: 正行)

== History ==
- November 7, 2007 : Designated open mold autonomy school.
- January 7, 2008 : Licensed establishment of Wabu High School.
- March 1, 2008 : Open a school. Hak-il Kim take office as 1st principal.
- March 1, 2010 : Designated public autonomy high school.
- March 1, 2012 : Gwang-woo Shin take office as 2nd principal.
