= OBS Gyeongin TV =

Coordinates: 37.52884°N 126.873881°E

OBS Gyeongin TV (HLQS-DTV)
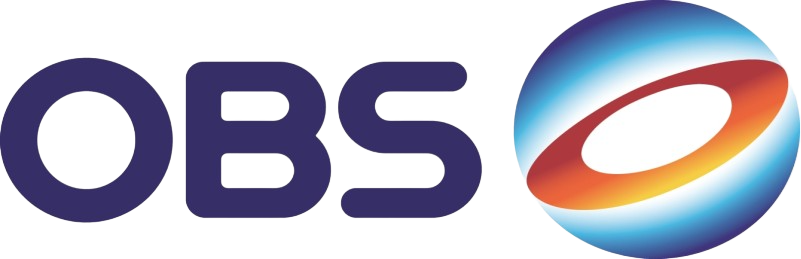
- OBS Gyeongin TV Logo

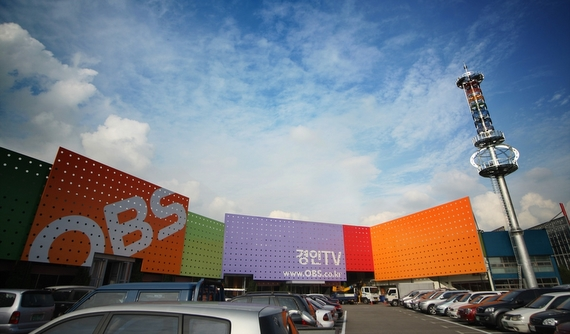
- OBS Gyeongin TV Headquarters
- Gyeonggi Province; South Korea
- City: Bucheon
- Channels: Digital: 36 (UHF); Virtual: 8
- Branding: OBS

Programming
- Affiliations: Independent

Ownership
- Owner: OBS Gyeongin TV Ltd.

History
- Founded: August 30, 2006
- First air date: December 28, 2007
- Former call signs: HLQS-TV (analog)
- Former channel number: Analog: UHF 21
- Call sign meaning: None (randomly assigned)

Technical information
- Licensing authority: Korea Communications Commission
- ERP: 5 kW

Links
- Website: http://www.obs.co.kr

OBS Gyeongin TV (Korean: OBS 경인 TV) is a South Korean free-to-air television station covering Gyeonggi Province, Incheon and Seoul. It is the only regional television network in operation, that is not affiliated with any national broadcast network.

== History ==
At the time of launch, OBS Gyeongin TV Ltd. was owned by the following companies:

- Young-An Hat Company (22.64%)
- Media Will (12.43%)
- KD Group (12.30%)

Officially, "OBS" does not stand for anything. However, as the channel's first president Joo Chulhwan explained, the "O" could mean "One", "Our", "Open", "Oasis" and "Opportunity".

On August 25, 2022, OBS requested a permit for a radio station, operating on the former FM frequency of the Gyeonggi Broadcasting Corporation. The station, as OBS Radio, opened on March 30, 2023.

== Gallery ==
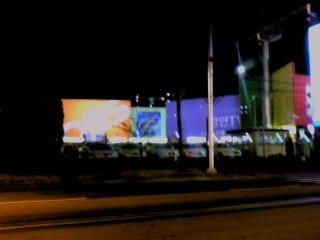
Building

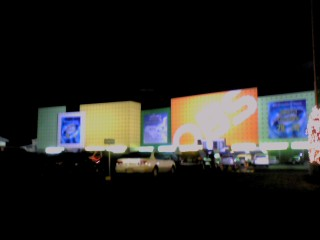
Building

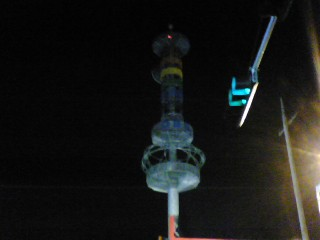
Tower
