= Wabu Lake =

- Location within China
- Coordinates: 32°25′59″N 116°53′10″E
- Lake type: Fresh water lake
- Catchment area: 800 km^{2} (310 sq mi)
- Basin countries: China
- Max. length: 37.3 km (23 mi)
- Max. width: 11.56 km (7 mi)
- Surface area: 163 km^{2} (100 sq mi)
- Average depth: 2.42 m (8 ft)
- Max. depth: 4.15 m (14 ft)
- Water volume: 394×10^{6} m^{3} (13.9×10^{9} cu ft)
- Surface elevation: 19 m (62 ft)

Wabu Lake (Chinese: 瓦埠湖; pinyin: Wǎbù Hú) is a freshwater lake in China, it is located in the center of Anhui Province, situated in the south bank of the middle reaches of the Huai River.

The area of the watershed is 800 square kilometres (310 sq mi), with an elevation of 19 metres (62 ft). The lake is 37.3 kilometres (23.2 mi) long and its greatest breadth from east to west is 11.56 kilometres (7 mi) (its average breadth is 4.37 kilometres (3 mi)). The lake has 163 square kilometres (100 sq mi) of area, and its volume is about 394 million cubic metres (13.9×10^{9} cu ft). The maximum depth of the Wabu Lake is 4.15 metres (14 ft); its average depth is 2.42 m (8 ft).
