= Namyangju =

City in Gyeonggi, South Korea

Coordinates: 37°38′N 127°13′E

- Specific city
- Panoramic view of Pyeongnae-dong and Hopyeong-dong

- Flag Logo

- Location in South Korea
- Country: South Korea
- Province: Gyeonggi
- Administrative divisions: 6 eup, 3 myeon, 7 dong

Government
  - Mayor: Choi Hyun-deok (Democratic)

Area
  - Total: 458.03 km^{2} (176.85 sq mi)

Population (September 2024)
  - Total: 732,783
  - Density: 1,445.66/km^{2} (3,744.2/sq mi)
  - Dialect: Seoul

Korean name
- Hangul: 남양주시
- Hanja: 南楊州市
- RR: Namyangju-si
- MR: Namyangju-si

Namyangju (Korean: 남양주; Korean pronunciation: [na.mjaŋ.dʑu]) is a city in Gyeonggi Province, South Korea. To the east is Gapyeong County, to the west is Guri, and to the north is Pocheon. Namyangju was originally a southern part of Yangju-gun, but was separated into Namyangju-gun in April 1980. In 1995, Migeum-si and Namyangju-gun were merged to form an urban and rural complex. The city hall is located in Geumgok-dong and Dasan-dong, and the administrative districts are 6-eup, 3-myeon, and 7-dong.

== History ==
Namyangju historical character: Chŏng Yagyong, also known by his art name Tasan [茶山] (1762–1836), was a leading Korean Confucian philosopher during the Joseon Dynasty. He is widely regarded as the greatest of the Silhak thinkers, who advocated that the formalist Neo-Confucian philosophy of Joseon return to practical concerns. Chŏng Yagyong and his brothers were also among the earliest Korean converts to Roman Catholicism. Chŏng was born, and also ended his days, in modern-day Namyangju, Gyeonggi province

- 1950 October to early 1951 Namyangju Massacre.
- 1980 April 1 Namyangju County was made with Guri-eup, Migeum-eup, Jinjeob-myeon, Jingeon-myeon, Hwado-myeon, Sudong-myeon, Wabu-myeon, and Byeolnae-myeon (2 eup, 6 myeon)
- 1980 December 1 Wabu-myeon became Wabu-eup (3 eup, 5 myeon)
- 1983 February 15 Jingeon-myeon Yangji-ri, Onam-ri, Palheon-ri were absorbed by Jinjeob-myeon
- 1986 January 1 Guri-eup became the city Guri (2 eup, 5 myeon)
- 1986 April 1 Wabu-eup Joan branch office became Joan-myeon (2 eup, 6 myeon)
- 1989 January 1 Migeum-eup became Miguem City (1 eup, 6 myeon)
- 1989 April 1 Jinjeob-myeon became Jinjeob-eup (2 eup, 5 myeon)
- 1989 April 1 Toegyewon branch office became Toegyewon-myeon (2 eup, 6 myeon)
- 1991 December 1 Hwado-myeon became Hwado-eup (3 eup, 5 myeon)
- 1992 April 1 In Jinjeob-eup, Onam branch office opened.
- 1995 January 1 Migeum City and Namyangju County were merged. (3 eup, 5 myeon, 6 dong)
- 1995 May 6 Onam branch office became Onam-myeon (3 eup, 6 myeon, 6 dong)
- 2001 September 12 Jingeon-myeon became Jingeon-eup (4 eup, 5 myeon, 6 dong)
- 2001 September 12 Onam-myeon became Onam-eup (5 eup, 4 myeon, 6 dong)
- 2005 June 1 In Byeolnae-myeon, Cheonghak branch office opened.
- 2006 January 20 Pungyang branch office opened; It has jurisdiction over Onam-eup, Jinjeob-eup, Toegyewon-myeon, Byeolnae-myeon
- 2006 November 20 In Hwado-eup, Dongbu branch office opened.
- 2008 October 7 The population reached 500,000 (the 13th city in South Korea to do so).
- 2009 December 14 Cheonghak branch office closed.
- 2011 September Namyangju Organic Museum opened, world's first museum of organic agriculture.

== Administrative divisions ==
- 5 Eup

-Hwado
-Jinjeob
-Jingeon
-Onam
-Wabu
-Toegyewon

- 3 Myeon

-Byeolnae
-Joan
-Sudong

- 7 Dong

-Byeolnae
-Dasan 1
-Dasan 2 - Suseok, Donong, Jigeum
-Geumgok
-Hopyeong
-Pyeongnae
-Yangjeong - Ilpae, Ipae, Sampae

== Location ==
Namyangju is a northeastern city which is part of the ring around Seoul. Seoul Ring Expressway passes through.

Jungang Line passes through Namyangju. - Donong station, Yangjeong station, Dukso station, Dosim station, Paldang station, Ungilsan station

A refurbished Gyeongchun Line reopened in late 2010 - Byeollae, Toegyewon, Sareung, Geumgok, Pyeongnae-hopyeong, Maseok stations are in Namyangju.

The Transportation and Construction Committee of the National Assembly extended Line 4 from Danggogae to Jinjeop, Namyangju.

The 2012 Munhwa Broadcasting Corporation drama Arang and the Magistrate, starring Lee Joon-gi, Shin Min-ah and Yeon Woo-jin, were filmed on location in Namyangju.

== Climate ==
Namyangju has a monsoon-influenced humid continental climate (Köppen: Dwa) with cold, dry winters and hot, rainy summers.

Climate data for Jingeon-eup, Namyangju (1993–2020 normals)
Month	Jan	Feb	Mar	Apr	May	Jun	Jul	Aug	Sep	Oct	Nov	Dec	Year
Mean daily maximum °C (°F)	2.7 (36.9)	6.0 (42.8)	12.1 (53.8)	18.8 (65.8)	24.5 (76.1)	28.4 (83.1)	29.5 (85.1)	30.4 (86.7)	26.4 (79.5)	20.5 (68.9)	12.3 (54.1)	4.5 (40.1)	18.0 (64.4)
Daily mean °C (°F)	−3.8 (25.2)	−0.7 (30.7)	5.1 (41.2)	11.4 (52.5)	17.3 (63.1)	21.9 (71.4)	24.8 (76.6)	25.2 (77.4)	20.0 (68.0)	12.7 (54.9)	5.5 (41.9)	−1.7 (28.9)	11.5 (52.7)
Mean daily minimum °C (°F)	−9.8 (14.4)	−6.9 (19.6)	−1.6 (29.1)	4.3 (39.7)	10.4 (50.7)	16.2 (61.2)	21.0 (69.8)	21.0 (69.8)	14.8 (58.6)	6.5 (43.7)	−0.3 (31.5)	−7.2 (19.0)	5.7 (42.3)
Average precipitation mm (inches)	16.0 (0.63)	25.5 (1.00)	29.7 (1.17)	64.6 (2.54)	91.8 (3.61)	133.6 (5.26)	414.7 (16.33)	333.5 (13.13)	131.7 (5.19)	53.1 (2.09)	45.9 (1.81)	18.3 (0.72)	1,358.4 (53.48)
Average precipitation days (≥ 0.1 mm)	3.3	3.9	4.9	6.6	7.1	8.5	13.6	13.1	6.8	4.6	7.1	4.4	83.9
Source: Korea Meteorological Administration

== Education ==
There are 2 campuses of Gyeong Hee graduate school and Gyeong bok college, 15 high schools, 29 middle schools, and 55 elementary schools.

- Wabu High School

== Historic landmarks ==
Namyangju is the location of the UNESCO World Heritage-listed Hongneung and Yureung Imperial Tombs, the final resting place of the 20th-century emperors Gojong and Sunjong and their families.

The royal tomb of Princess Hwahyeop, a Joseon dynasty princess, was discovered in Sampae-dong in 2015. Excavations in 2016 unearthed stone tablets detailing eulogies to her written by King Yeongjo, Crown Prince Sado, and King Jeongjo.

== Namyangju Organic Museum ==
Namyangju is rapidly developing a reputation as a regional centre of excellence for organic farming. The Namyangju Organic Museum, the world's first museum dedicated to the history and development of organic agriculture, opened in September 2011. It is located west of Seoul and on the shores of the River Han. The museum caters for young and old, it includes a timeline of organic farming developments, and there are exhibits of traditional Korean farming practices tied to the 24 seasonal divisions of the year. The museum's opening coincided with Namyangju hosting the 17th IFOAM Organic World Congress.

== Products ==
Sweet pears grown in Namyangju are exported to the United States, Japan, and Canada. Organic vegetables are cultivated with ecofriendly methods.

Gorosoei is a special product made in the Namyangju area. It is medicinal water which has abundant minerals.

The term "Gorosoei" comes from "Gollisu" meaning "water for bones." The sap is extracted at Sudong-Myeon, Mountain Jugeum in Mount Chungnyeong Natural Recreation Forest, Mount Cheonma in Palhyeon and Onam township.

== Twin towns – sister cities ==
Namyangju is twinned with:

- Changzhou, China
- Dartford, England, United Kingdom
- Victoria, Canada
- Gangjin, South Korea
- Huế, Vietnam
- Jeongeup, South Korea
- Ithaca, New York, United States
- Kampong Cham, Cambodia
- Sacheon, South Korea
- Vinh, Vietnam
- Yeongwol, South Korea
- Fort Lee, New Jersey, United States

== Notable people ==
- Han Groo – actress and singer
- Huh Chan-mi – singer, dancer and actress, former member of Coed School and F-ve Dolls
- Jeon Hye-bin – actress, singer and model, former member of Luv
- Kim Byung-sun (known as Fleta) – professional Overwatch League player
- Kim Chae-yeon – figure skater
- Kim Jiwoo (stage name Jiwoo) – singer, member of Korean girl group NMIXX https://nmixx.jype.com/Mobile/Profile
- Kim Yugyeom – singer and rapper, member of Got7
- Kwon Bo-ah (stage name BoA) – singer, songwriter, record producer and actress
- Kwon Soon-young (stage name Hoshi) – singer, dancer and member of Seventeen
- Lee Hee Seung (stage name Heeseung) – singer, member of Enhypen
- Lee Kwang-soo – actor, entertainer and model
- Oh Hyeon-gyu – footballer
- Park Minju (stage name Minju) – singer, member of Korean girl group ILLIT https://beliftlab.com/artist/profile/Illit
- Park Sung-hoon (stage name Sunghoon) – singer and former figure skater, member of Enhypen; has lived in Namyangju
- Yeo Hoon-min – singer, dancer and actor, member of K-pop boy band U-KISS

== See also ==
- List of cities in South Korea
